= Gönczi =

Gönczi ([ˈɡøntsi], adjective form of Göncz, a magyarized form of Kunz and other descendants of the German male given name Konrad like Kunze, Kunzel, Kunzler or Künzler) is a Hungarian surname of patronymic or toponymic origin. It may refer to:

- Anna Gönczi (born 1959), Hungarian sports shooter
- Ferenc Gönczi (1935–2009), Hungarian sports shooter
- Róbert Gönczi (1951–2000), Hungarian boxer
- Vera Gönczi (born 1969), Hungarian alpine skier
