= Künzle =

Künzle may refer to:

- Albert Künzler (1911-1982), Swiss ice hockey player
- David Kunzle (1936-2024), British art historian professor
- Christian Künzle (born 1954), Swiss pair skater
- Hans Peter Kunzle (born 1951), Swiss jazz musician
- Johann Kunzle (1857-1945), Swiss catholic priest and herborist
- Johannes Kunzle (1749-1820), Swiss politician
- Karin Künzle (born 1954), Swiss pair skater
- Michael Kunzle (born 1965), Swiss politician
- Michèle Kunzle (born 1961), Swiss politician
- Mike Kunzle (born 1993), Swiss ice hockey player
- Ruth Künzle (born 1972), Swiss ice hockey player

== See also ==
- Künzel
- Küntzel
- Künzli
