= Penn Medicine Park =

Baseball stadium in Lancaster, Pennsylvania

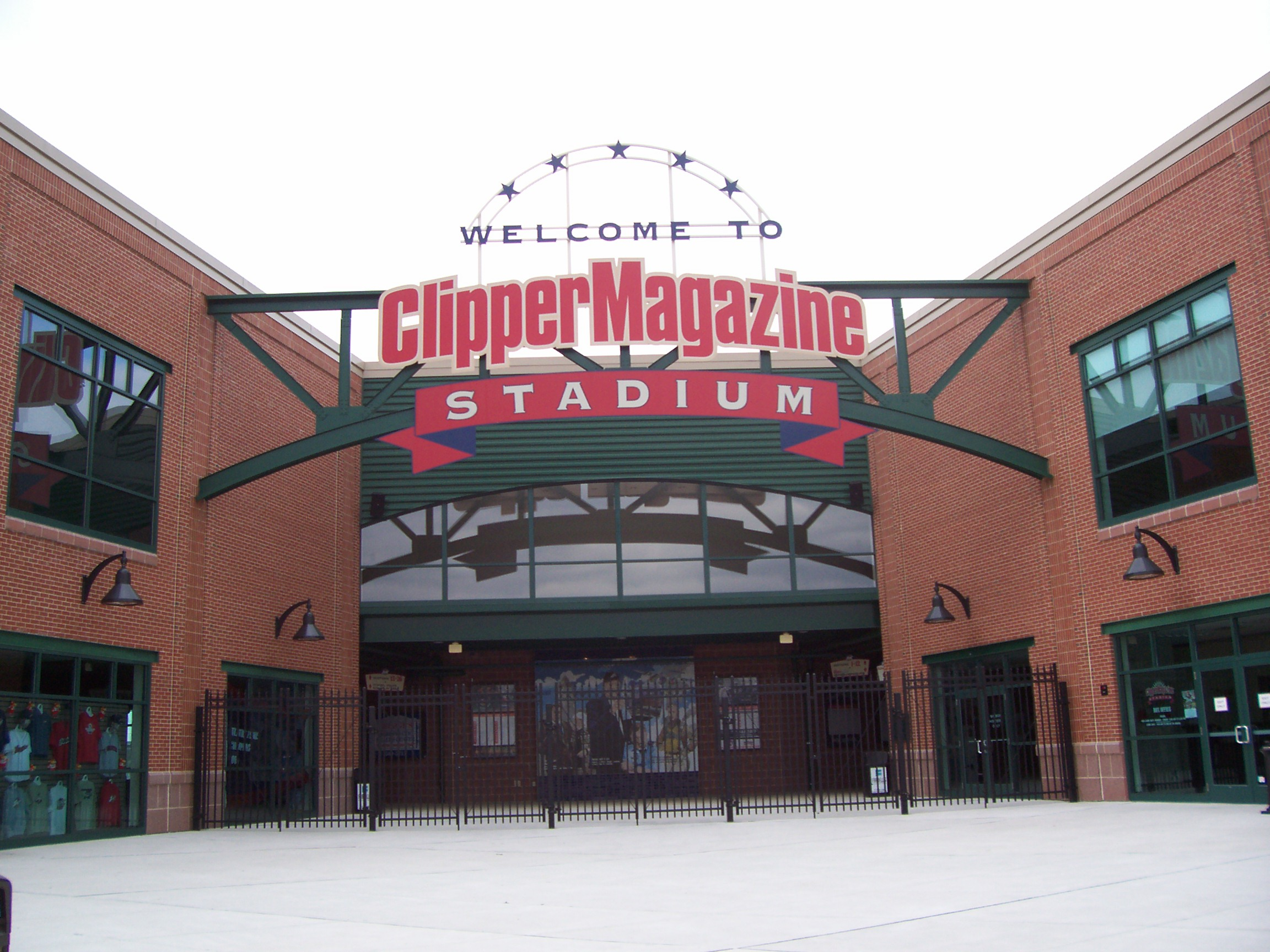
- Interactive map of Penn Medicine Park
- Former names: Clipper Magazine Stadium (2005–2024)
- Location: 650 North Prince Street; Lancaster, Pennsylvania 17603
- Coordinates: 40°2′55″N 76°18′39″W
- Owner: Lancaster County Redevelopment Authority
- Operator: Lancaster Baseball LLC
- Capacity: 8,000
- Surface: Grass (2005–2023); Artificial Turf (2024–present)
- Field size: Left Field: 320 feet (98 m); Left Center: 409 feet (125 m); Center Field: 400 feet (120 m); Right Center: 363 feet (111 m); Right Field: 300 feet (91 m); Wall: 17 feet (5.2 m)
- Public transit: RRTA bus: 3, 6

Construction
- Groundbreaking: April 28, 2004
- Opened: May 11, 2005
- Cost: $23.4 million
- Architects: Tetra Tech, Inc.

Tenants
- Lancaster Stormers (ALPB) 2005–present Franklin & Marshall Diplomats (NCAA) 2026–present Harrisburg City Islanders (USL) 2016

Penn Medicine Park (formerly known as "Clipper Magazine Stadium") is a baseball park located in Lancaster, Pennsylvania, in the Northwest Corridor neighborhood. It is the home of the Lancaster Stormers, the city's Atlantic League of Professional Baseball (ALPB) franchise, and the Franklin & Marshall Diplomats baseball team. It hosted its first regular-season baseball game on May 11, 2005, with the Barnstormers losing to the Atlantic City Surf, 4–3. The ballpark also serves as the corporate headquarters for the Atlantic League and seats 8,000 people.

The ballpark features an artificial turf playing field. Its many food stands serve Pennsylvania Dutch and Philadelphia cuisine such as whoopie pies, cheesesteaks, hoagies, Tastykakes, soft pretzels from local bakeries and the Philly Pretzel Factory, barbecue from the four-time state champion Hess's BBQ, hot dogs from Kunzler & Company, beer from the Lancaster Brewing Company and Yuengling, ice cream and tea from Turkey Hill, salty treats from Utz and Snyder's of Hanover, and confections from nearby Hershey's. Penn Medicine Park lies in the Northwest Corridor of Lancaster city, which includes Franklin & Marshall College and Penn Medicine Lancaster General Health. In October 2008, the venue hosted vice-presidential nominee Sarah Palin during the 2008 U.S. presidential election.

About 104,000 fans on BallparkDigest.com, a website by August Publications, ranked Penn Medicine Park the "2020 Best of the Ballparks" out of all independent U.S. and Canadian baseball parks by a margin of 86 to 14 percent over the next runner-up, U.S. Steel Yard in Gary, Indiana. Penn Medicine Park also won the 2021 "Best of the Ballparks MLB Partner Leagues" over runner-up, Franklin Field in suburban Milwaukee. The Atlantic League awarded Penn Medicine Park the "Ballpark of the Year" following the end of its 2013 regular season, commemorating the Stormers staff for their excellence in groundskeeping and operations.

The University of Pennsylvania Health System (i.e., "Penn Medicine"), a Philadelphia-based healthcare company with three local affiliates—Lancaster General Hospital, the Women & Babies Hospital, and the Lancaster Rehabilitation Hospital—purchased the naming rights for an undisclosed sum over ten years in 2025.

== History ==
Forty-four years before the opening of Penn Medicine Park and the Lancaster Stormers' inaugural season, the Lancaster Red Roses entertained baseball enthusiasts for 20 years at Stumpf Field. Efforts for a new stadium and a new team began in 1987, and what was a long sixteen-year battle finally paid off with an announcement in 2003. The Commonwealth of Pennsylvania agreed to fund roughly half of the cost with Opening Day Partners, and the city of Lancaster covered the remainder. The original plan in 2001 called for a proposed, $20-million ballpark to be constructed on the Diseley Farm site, across from Long's Park in Manheim Township. However, officials canceled those plans due to residential concerns about traffic and political concerns about the use of eminent domain and rezoning. After terminating this plan, most Lancaster County politicians supported building a downtown ballpark to promote urban renewal. The Lancaster County Redevelopment Authority selected an industrial site at the corner of North Prince and Frederick streets, where a company called Ace Rents operated. Initially, Ace Rents stalled the process, but quickly agreed as they did not want to cause a delay. Officials held the groundbreaking ceremony on April 28, 2004, and completed Penn Medicine Park shortly before it opened on May 11, 2005.

With its brick façade and steel beams, the architecture of Penn Medicine Park alludes to its industrial surroundings. Located in the Northwest Corridor, the ballpark faces many downtown factories and spans a former rail yard. Coincidentally, this section of Lancaster city (between North Mary and North Charlotte Streets, south of the Harrisburg Pike) was historically known as the "base ball ground" circa 1886.

=== Atlantic League All-Star Games ===
2016 ALPB All-Star Game logo

On July 12, 2007, the Lancaster Stormers hosted the Atlantic League's tenth-anniversary All-Star Game at Penn Medicine Park. A crowd of 7,361 watched as the opposing North Division team won, 8-6. Lancaster players Jeremy Todd and Dominick Ambrosini both hit home runs, but it was not enough to put their South Division team ahead.

On July 13, 2016, the Stormers hosted their second Atlantic League All-Star Game, joining their Freedom Division teammates to win by a score of 3-1.

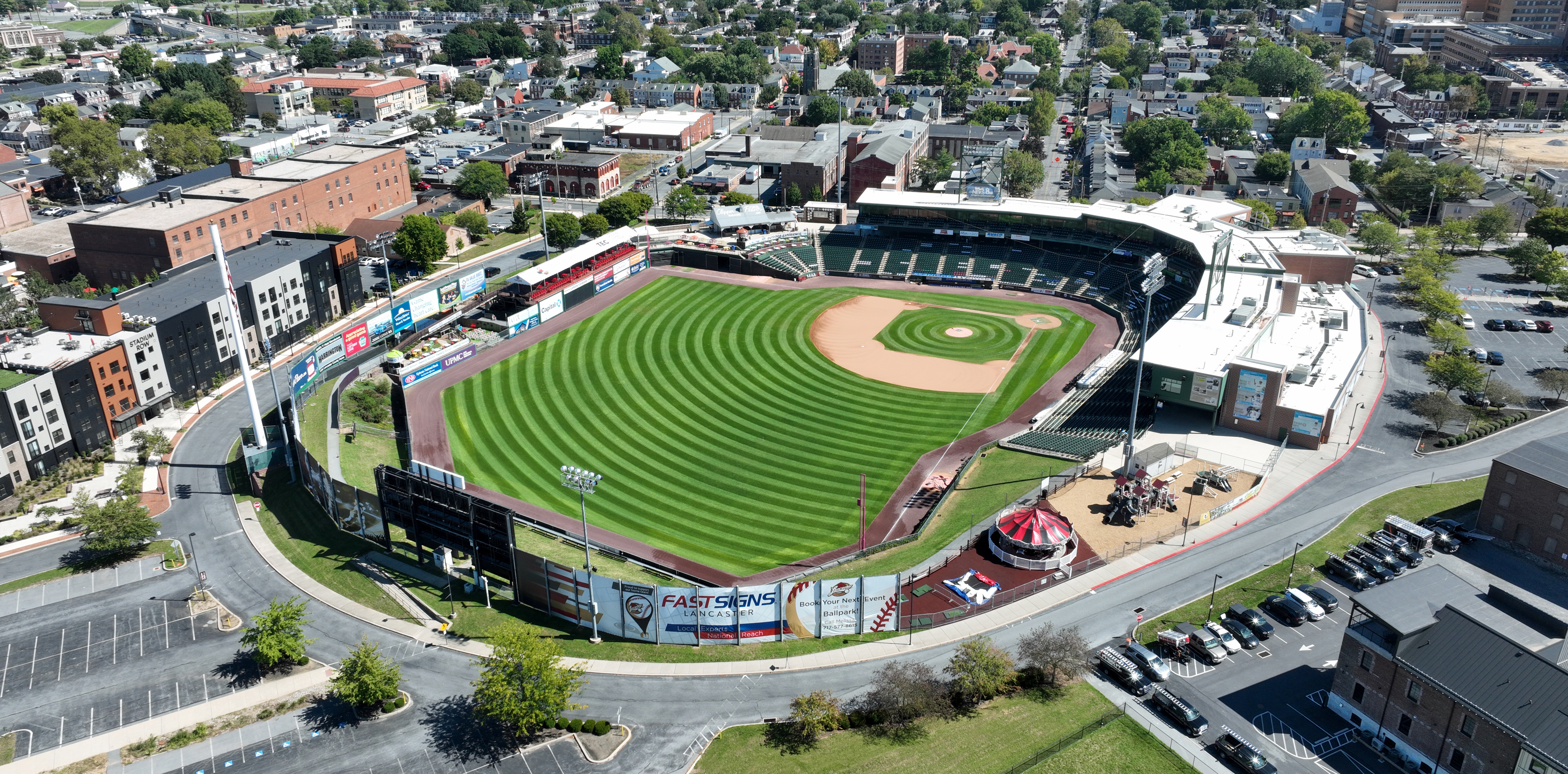
Penn Medicine Park - Lancaster, PA, September 15, 2023

== Ballpark attractions ==
The venue includes a Kid's Park with a birthday zone, a carousel, jungle gyms, a rock climbing wall, and various inflatables. Cylo's Clubhouse allows for youth to interact with the Stormers' bovine mascot, Cylo. Behind Section 13, the stadium features the Little Sluggers Dugout, an enclosed area for nursing mothers with a toddler play area and a television. The local Subaru dealer sponsors an outdoor area complete with bocce ball, corn-hole, a life-size Jenga, shuffleboard, ping pong, giant checkers, a kissing booth, and a barbershop corner. The area also features the Broken Bat Craft Beer Deck, which features a wide variety of Central Pennsylvania craft beer choices. The Inside Corner Team Store located at the home-plate entrance features team apparel and souvenirs; it remains open throughout the year.

A mural honors Lancaster's professional baseball history, especially Richard M. Scott, the former mayor (1974–1979) who initiated the civic effort toward building Penn Medicine Park.

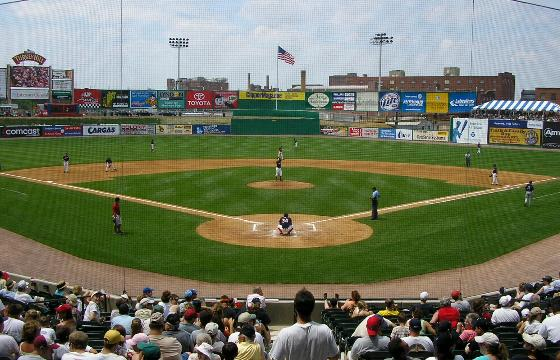
Infield at Penn Medicine Park

Before the 2013 Atlantic League season, the Stormers made a series of improvements to Penn Medicine Park. The first of these was a new playground for children along the third-base line featuring a foam-based protective floor. Other improvements included a renovated picnic area with new tents and a deck comprising synthetic materials instead of wood, a new right-field wall, landscaping beyond the outfield, and computerized irrigation controls.

=== Silverball Museum Arcade ===
The Lancaster Stormers added the Silverball Museum Arcade in time for the 2011 Atlantic League season. It is a coin-free attraction that features nostalgic arcade games from the 1930s to some of the video games played today. Each machine possesses a description of its history and inspiration. The Silverball Museum Arcade also features televisions and multimedia displays detailing everything about pinball.

=== Stitches Sculpture ===
In late 2012, artist Derek Parker installed his "Baseball Stitches" sculpture along the main walkway of Penn Medicine Park on North Prince Street. It symbolically links the ballpark to the city of Lancaster. As the sixth Poetry Paths project completed by Franklin & Marshall College's Writer's House, the stitches also tie professional baseball and the arts. It includes the Le Hinton poem called "Our Ballpark" and is part of a $250,000 initiative by the Lancaster County Community Foundation to add art and poetry into Lancaster city's urban environment.

== Special events ==
=== Countdown Lancaster ===
On New Year's Eve 2010, Penn Medicine Park hosted its first celebration, "Countdown Lancaster". Organizers coordinated the event with a concert, fireworks, and the Red Rose drop at nearby Binns Park.

=== Ice Park at Penn Medicine Park ===
Penn Medicine Park is converted into an outdoor public ice-skating rink during the winter months, allowing the Lancaster community to enjoy the park in the off-season. Using state-of-the-art equipment, the right field segment of the ballpark is converted into an ice skating rink, measuring 135 feet by 85 feet, with skate rentals available. The concessions serve ballpark fare, as well as soup, coffee, and hot chocolate. In 2010, a 26-foot Ice Slide attraction by Avalanche Express was added to the Ice Park.

=== LeSean McCoy Celebrity Softball Game ===
In 2012, the Stormers held their first annual celebrity softball game, which was hosted by LeSean McCoy, an All-Pro running back on the Philadelphia Eagles and Harrisburg native. The contest pits the Eagles against professional football players from other teams in the National Football League. The 2012 Eagles roster featured Brent Celek, Hugh Douglas, DeSean Jackson, Jeremy Maclin, Dominique Rodgers-Cromartie, Torrey Smith, Michael Vick, and Brian Westbrook. Their opponents included Victor Cruz of the New York Giants, Devin Hester of the Chicago Bears, Cam Newton of the Carolina Panthers, Hakeem Nicks of the New York Giants, Ray Rice of the Baltimore Ravens, and Mike Wallace of the Pittsburgh Steelers.

Organizers direct any proceeds collected from the LeSean McCoy Celebrity Softball Game to the LeSean McCoy Foundation. This 501(c)(3) organization serves to raise funds and awareness for amyotrophic lateral sclerosis. LeSean McCoy is motivated by his grandmother's death due to ALS. Additionally, the Foundation also provides for the underprivileged in Central Pennsylvania and Philadelphia. Some of the money collected from the 2012 game provided Christmas toys to the Boys and Girls Club and the Salvation Army, sports gear to the Police Athletic League, a professional football game and a winter vacation for families affected by ALS, winter coats and backpacks containing necessary school supplies for impoverished children, and winter coats for a women's and children's shelter in Philadelphia.

=== Concerts ===
Penn Medicine Park hosted various concerts, including rock musicians Bob Dylan, Bryan Adams, Def Leppard, Jefferson Starship, Lynyrd Skynyrd, and Peter Frampton; country music artists Clint Black, Dwight Yoakam, and Willie Nelson; and smooth jazz instrumentalist Kenny G.

=== Soccer ===
On July 16, 2009, Penn Medicine Park hosted an exhibition match between the Harrisburg City Islanders and Crystal Palace F.C., a Premier League team based in London, England. Workers covered the ballpark's infield with grass sod to comply with FIFA regulations. Additionally, local soccer clubs scheduled training sessions to maximize the use of the temporary soccer pitch.

In August 2015, the venue hosted two more professional soccer matches. The first one featured the Harrisburg City Islanders versus FC Montreal, both members of the United Soccer League. The second game included the Philadelphia Union, a Major League Soccer club, versus Harrisburg. For the 2016 USL season, the City Islanders played five of their home games at Penn Medicine Park. The other ten were played at their regular home, FNB Field on Harrisburg's City Island.
