= Kandy Kake =

Kandy Kake may refer to:

- Kandy Kake is a product produced by the Tasty Baking Company as part of the Tastykake product line.
- Kandy Kake was the original name of the Baby Ruth candy bar.
- Kandy Kakes is the name of a roller derby competitor in the Gotham Girls Roller Derby league.
