= Kunzler =

Kunzler can refer to:

- Künzler, a surname
- John Eugene Kunzler (1923–2006), American scientist and physicist
- Martin Kunzler (born 1947), German jazz bassist and music journalist
- Kunzler & Company, American food company
