= North Philadelphia station (SEPTA Metro) =

Rapid transit station in Philadelphia

North Philadelphia
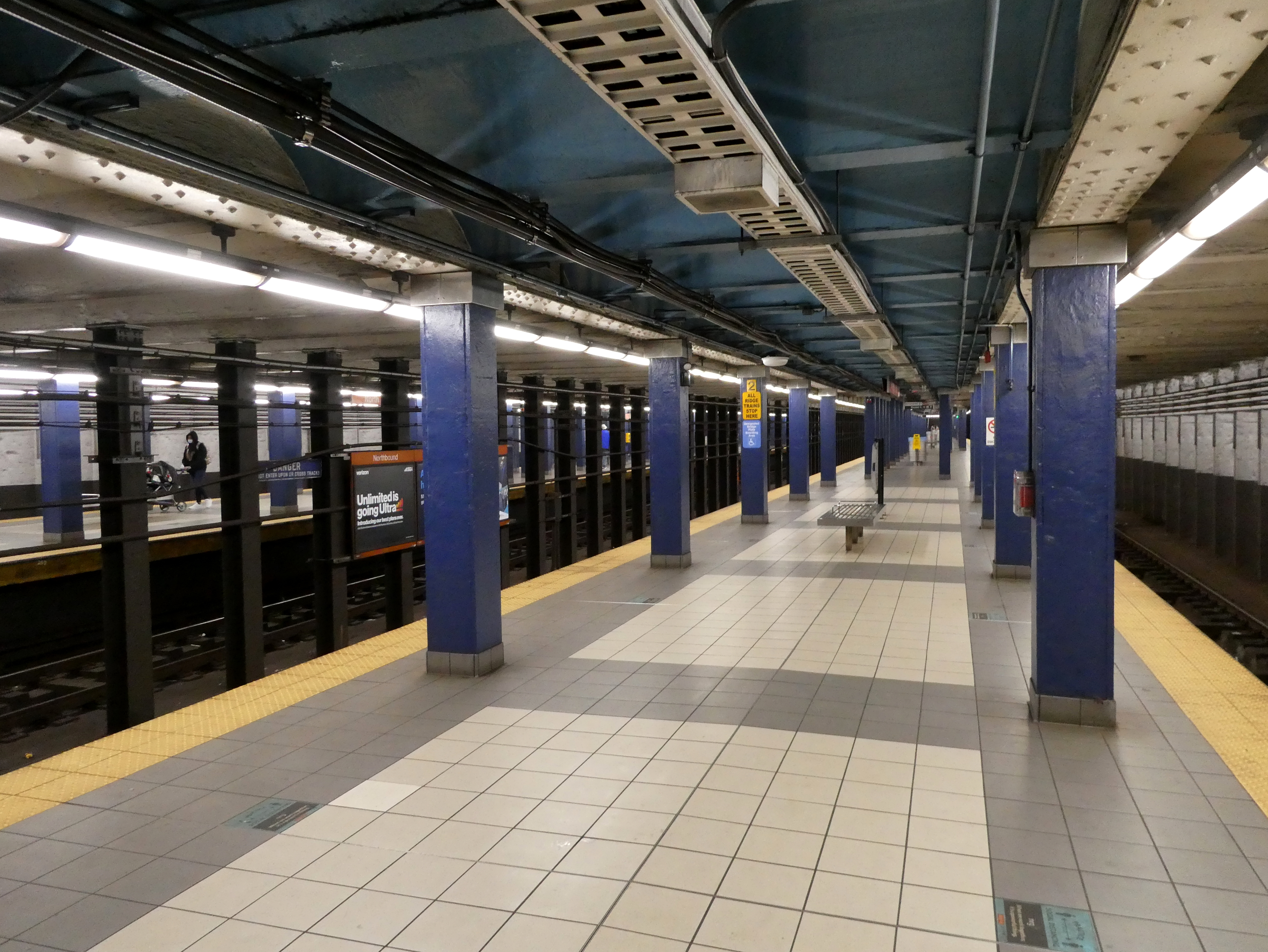
- North Philadelphia station in 2022

General information
- Location: 2700 North Broad Street; Philadelphia, Pennsylvania
- Coordinates: 39°59′39″N 75°09′16″W
- Owner: City of Philadelphia
- Operator: SEPTA
- Platforms: 2 island platforms
- Tracks: 4
- Connections: SEPTA City Bus: 4, 16, 54; at North Broad; at North Philadelphia; Amtrak at North Philadelphia

Construction
- Structure type: Underground
- Accessible: Yes

History
- Opened: September 1, 1928
- Rebuilt: 2010

Services
Preceding station	SEPTA Metro	Following station
Susquehanna–Dauphin toward NRG Station	B (SEPTA Metro)	Broad–Allegheny toward Fern Rock T.C.
Broad–Girard toward 8th–Market	B (SEPTA Metro)	Erie toward Fern Rock T.C.
does not stop here
Location

North Philadelphia station is a rapid transit station on the SEPTA Metro B located in the North Philadelphia neighborhood of Philadelphia. The station is located under North Broad Street with headhouses at Glenwood Avenue and Lehigh Avenue. It is adjacent to North Broad station (served by SEPTA Regional Rail) and North Philadelphia station (served by Regional Rail and Amtrak). The station is served by the B1 and B3 services but not the B2.

== History ==
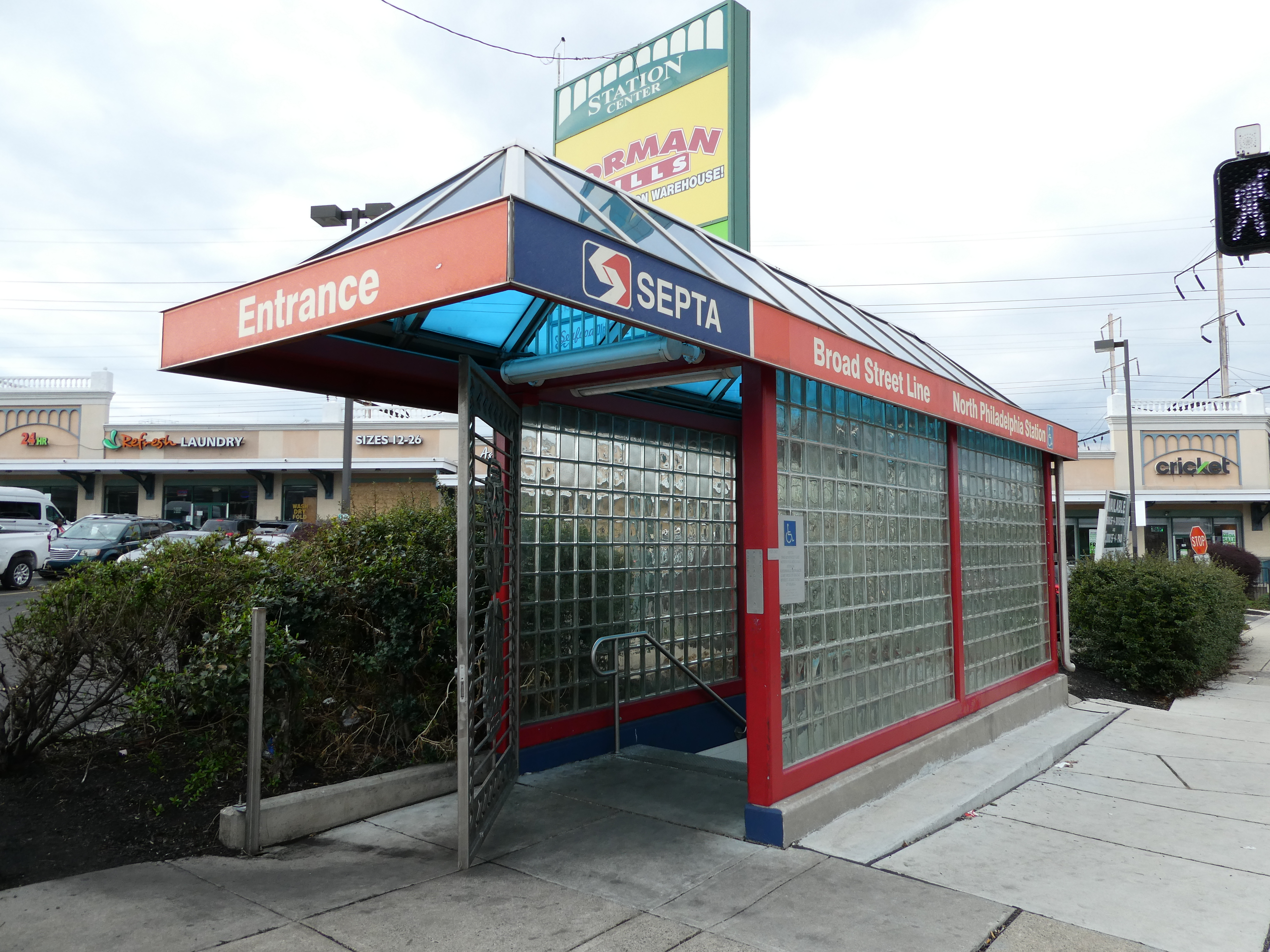
The 2000s-built northwest headhouse

The North Philadelphia station opened with the initial segment of the Broad Street Line on September 1, 1928, in the growing North Philadelphia area. The Pennsylvania Railroad's North Philadelphia station and the Reading Railroad's then-under-construction North Broad Street station were nearby; a direct passage was built from the subway station to the pedestrian underpass at North Broad Street station. As the neighborhood deteriorated over the decades, the passage was closed, and the headhouses at Glenwood Avenue became exit-only.

Around 2005, SEPTA embarked on a $17.7 million reconstruction of the station which included five new headhouses (including the ability to enter from Glenwood), elevators for accessibility, new signage, and improved amenities. The work was originally to be completed by in fall 2007; however, by the end of 2007, the headhouses were finished but the elevators were not yet installed. The rebuilt station was dedicated on April 29, 2010.
