= North Broad station =

Railway station in Philadelphia

North Broad
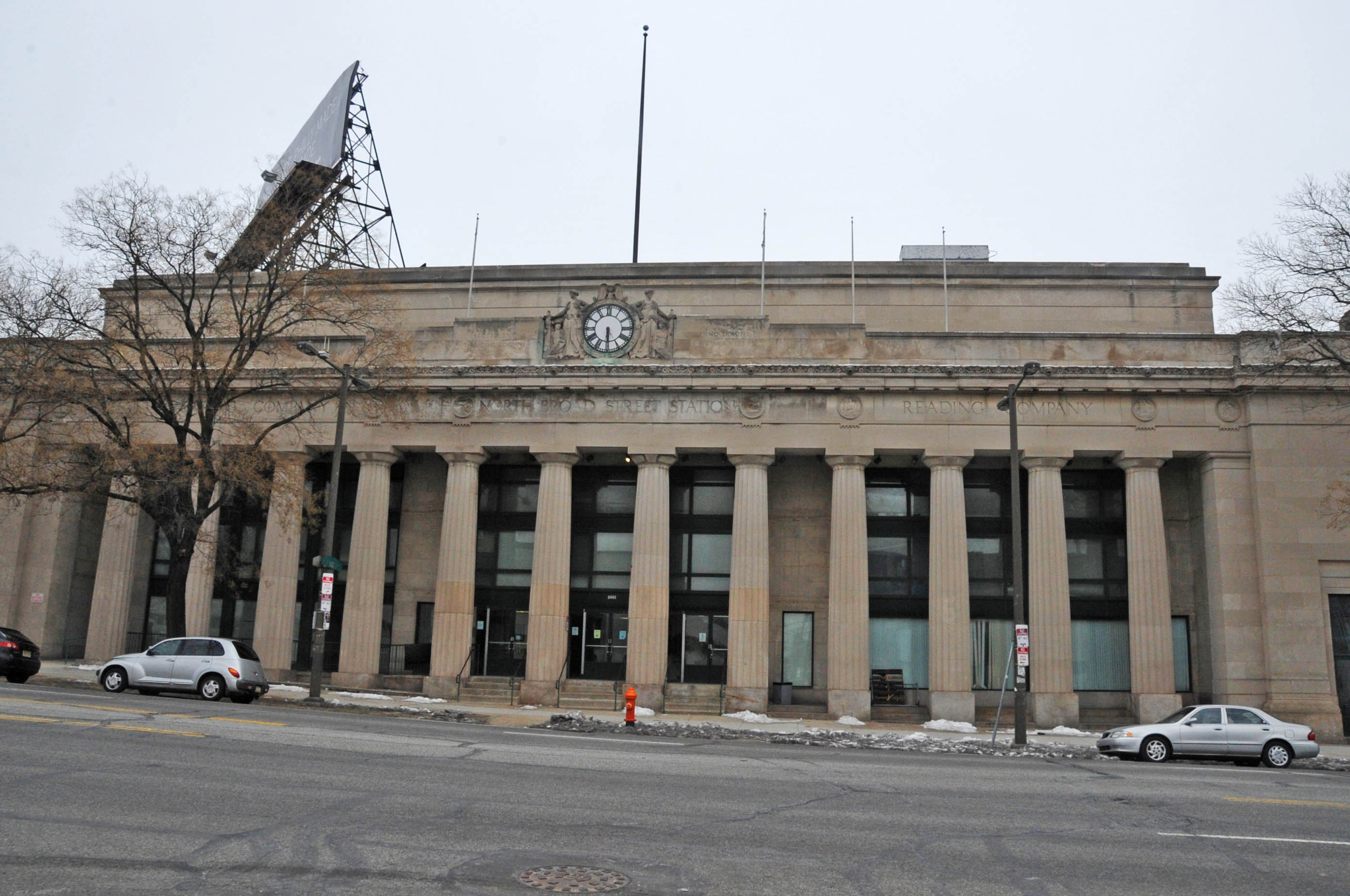
- North Broad station house on Broad Street, built by the former Reading Railroad

General information
- Location: 2601 North Broad Street; Philadelphia, Pennsylvania
- Coordinates: 39°59′32.5″N 75°9′16″W
- Owner: City of Philadelphia
- Operator: SEPTA
- Lines: Norristown Branch; SEPTA Main Line
- Platforms: 2 side platforms
- Tracks: 4
- Connections: SEPTA Metro: (North Philadelphia); (North Philadelphia); SEPTA City Bus: 4, 16, 54

Construction
- Structure type: At-grade
- Parking: Street-side
- Accessible: Yes

History
- Opened: 1929
- Electrified: 1931

Services
Preceding station	SEPTA	Following station
Temple University toward Penn Medicine Station	Lansdale/Doylestown Line	Wayne Junction toward Doylestown
Temple University toward Penn Medicine Station	Manayunk/Norristown Line	Allegheny toward Norristown–Elm Street
Airport Line does not stop here
Chestnut Hill East Line does not stop here
Fox Chase Line does not stop here
Warminster Line does not stop here
West Trenton Line does not stop here
Former services
Preceding station	SEPTA	Following station
Reading Terminal Terminus	Pottsville Line	Norristown toward Pottsville
Preceding station	Reading Railroad	Following station
Columbia Avenue toward Philadelphia	Main Line	22nd Street toward Pottsville
Columbia Avenue toward Philadelphia	Bethlehem Branch	Wayne Junction toward Bethlehem
Columbia Avenue toward Philadelphia	Chestnut Hill Branch	Tioga toward Chestnut Hill
Columbia Avenue toward Philadelphia	New York Branch	Tioga toward Bound Brook
Columbia Avenue toward Philadelphia	Norristown Branch	22nd Street toward Elm Street
Philadelphia Terminus	Frankford Branch	Wayne Junction toward Frankford
- North Broad Street Station, Reading Company
- U.S. National Register of Historic Places
- Interactive map of North Broad Street Station, Reading Company
- Architect: Horace Trumbauer; Irwin & Leighton
- Architectural style: Classical Revival
- NRHP reference No.: 96000325
- Added to NRHP: March 28, 1996
Location

North Broad station, known as North Broad Street until 1992, is a SEPTA Regional Rail station in Philadelphia, Pennsylvania. It is located at 2601 North Broad Street (PA 611) in the Cecil B. Moore section of Lower North Philadelphia, and serves the Lansdale/Doylestown Line and the Manayunk/Norristown Line. The station has low-level platforms on the outside tracks, with "mini-high" platforms for wheelchair accessibility.

North Broad station is within a few blocks of the North Philadelphia SEPTA-Amtrak station (formerly belonging to the Pennsylvania Railroad), which serves Amtrak's Keystone Service and SEPTA's Trenton Line and Chestnut Hill West Line, and the North Philadelphia subway station on SEPTA's Broad Street Line. The station is in the Center City fare zone, although the station itself is located in North Philadelphia.

== History ==
=== Huntingdon Street station ===
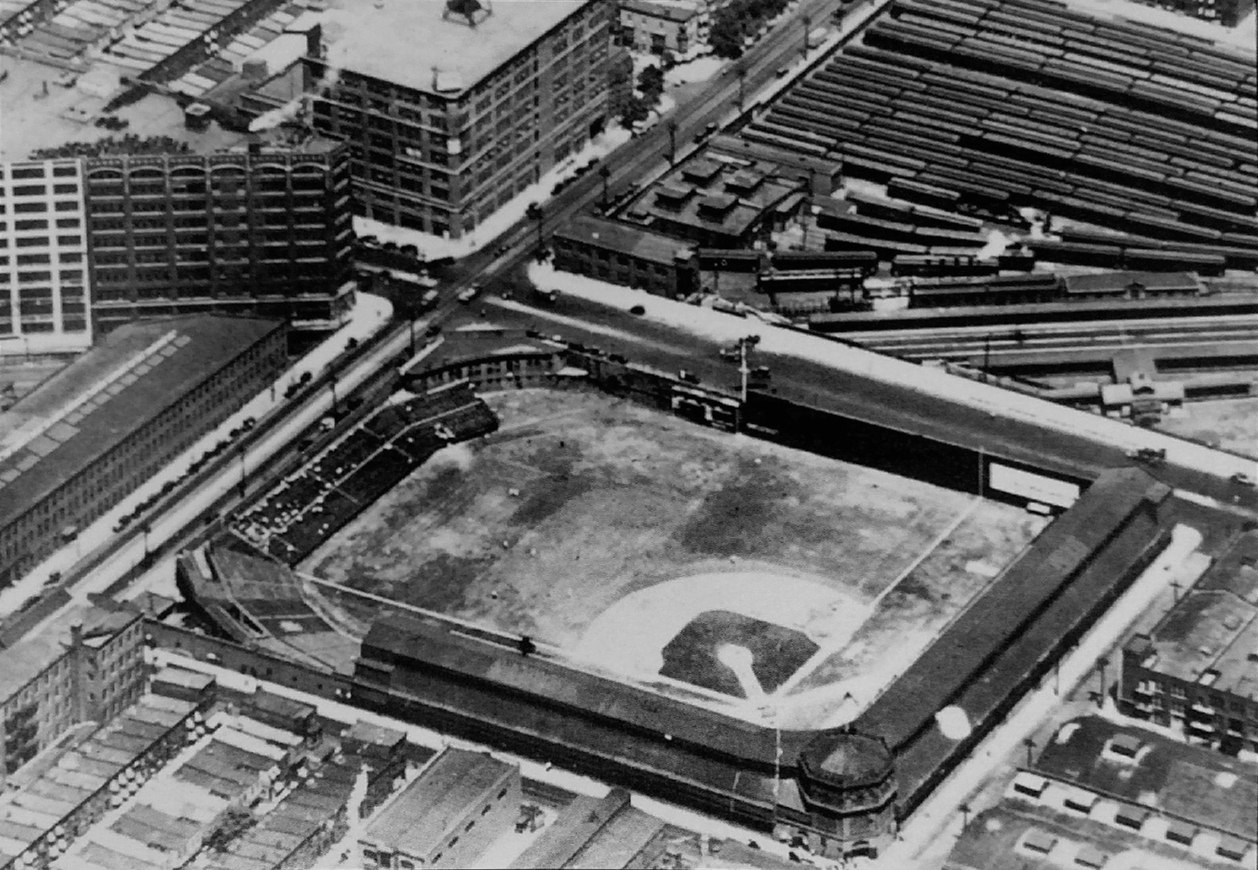
The Baker Bowl in 1928, with the soon-to-be demolished Huntingdon Street station at right

The Pennsylvania Railroad (PRR) built the Connecting Railway in 1867 to connect its main line to the Philadelphia and Trenton Railroad. By the early 1870s, New York Junction station was established where the Connecting Railway crossed over the Philadelphia and Reading Railroad mainline in North Philadelphia. By the early 1880s, the Reading established 16th Street station a block to the northwest.

In 1888, the Reading announced plans to add local stations on the line, including one next to the Philadelphia Ball Park (later called Baker Bowl), which had opened as the home of the Philadelphia Phillies in 1887. By 1891, the company offered service to Huntingdon Street station as well as 16th Street. The station had two side platforms serving the line's four tracks, with a small station building facing Broad Street and Huntingdon Street. 16th Street station was closed in the early 20th century.

=== North Broad Street station ===
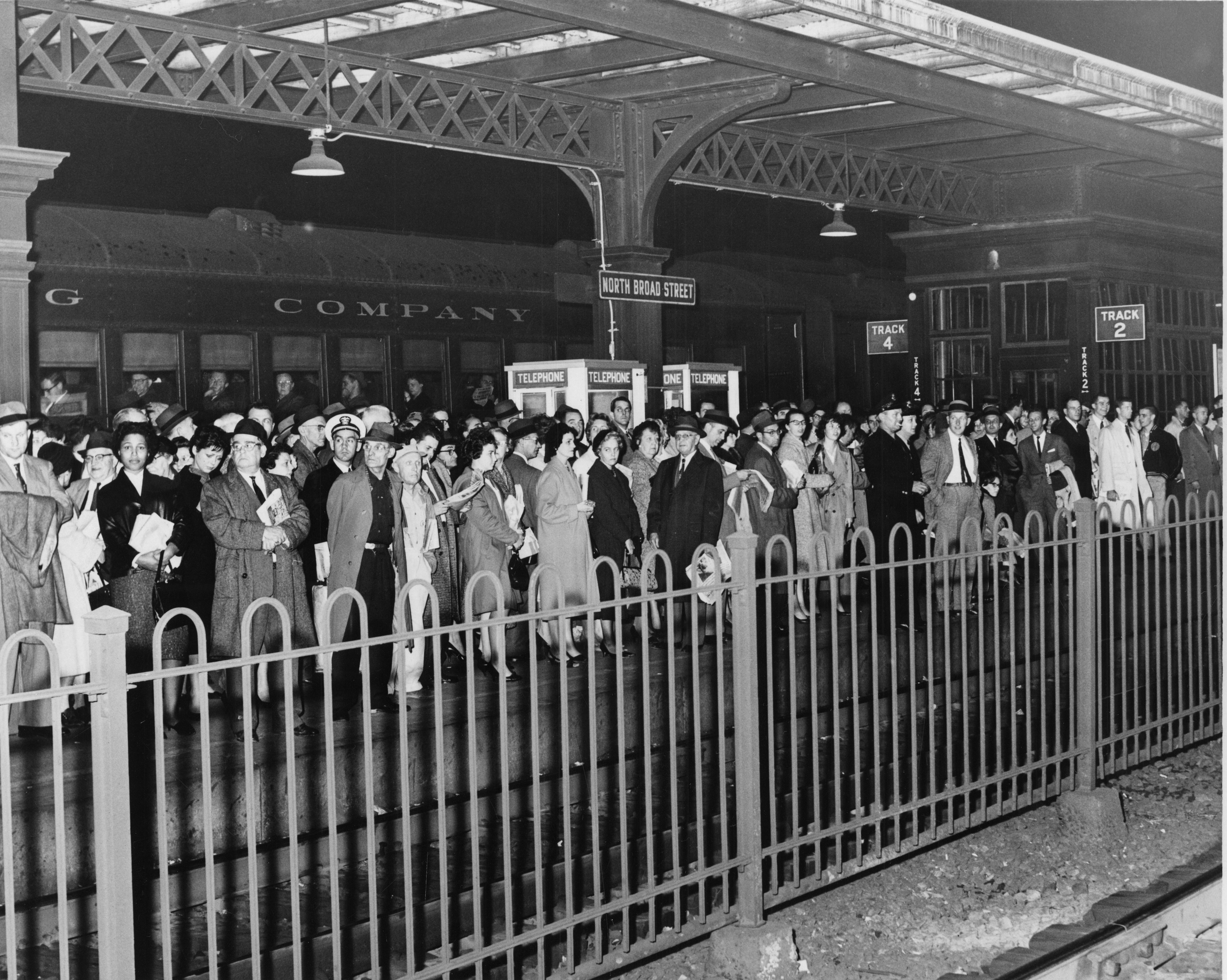
Passengers at North Broad Street in November 1960. Reading Terminal was closed due to fire, forcing passengers to use the Broad Street Line and North Broad Street station.

In 1928, facing competition from the impending completion of the Broad Street Line, the Reading decided to replace Huntingdon Street station with a larger station to rival the PRR's nearby North Philadelphia station. Groundbreaking for Broad Street station was held on July 31, 1928 and demolition of Huntingdon Street station began immediately. The classical revival station, designed by Horace Trumbauer, opened as North Broad Street in 1929. The station featured two island platforms which served all four tracks, connected by an underground walkway to the station, street, and the Broad Street Line's North Philadelphia station. Its grand design reflected pre-Great Depression optimism and plans for redevelopment of the surrounding neighborhood.

However, the Great Depression took away passengers and prevented the planned development, and the collapse of local industry after World War II further damaged the neighborhood. Ridership at the station dwindled as passengers opted for private cars or the more frequent subway. The station building was closed and sold for use as a motel in the 1960s; passengers continued to access the platforms through the pedestrian tunnel. In 1981, the station was heavily damaged by fire.

=== Railworks ===
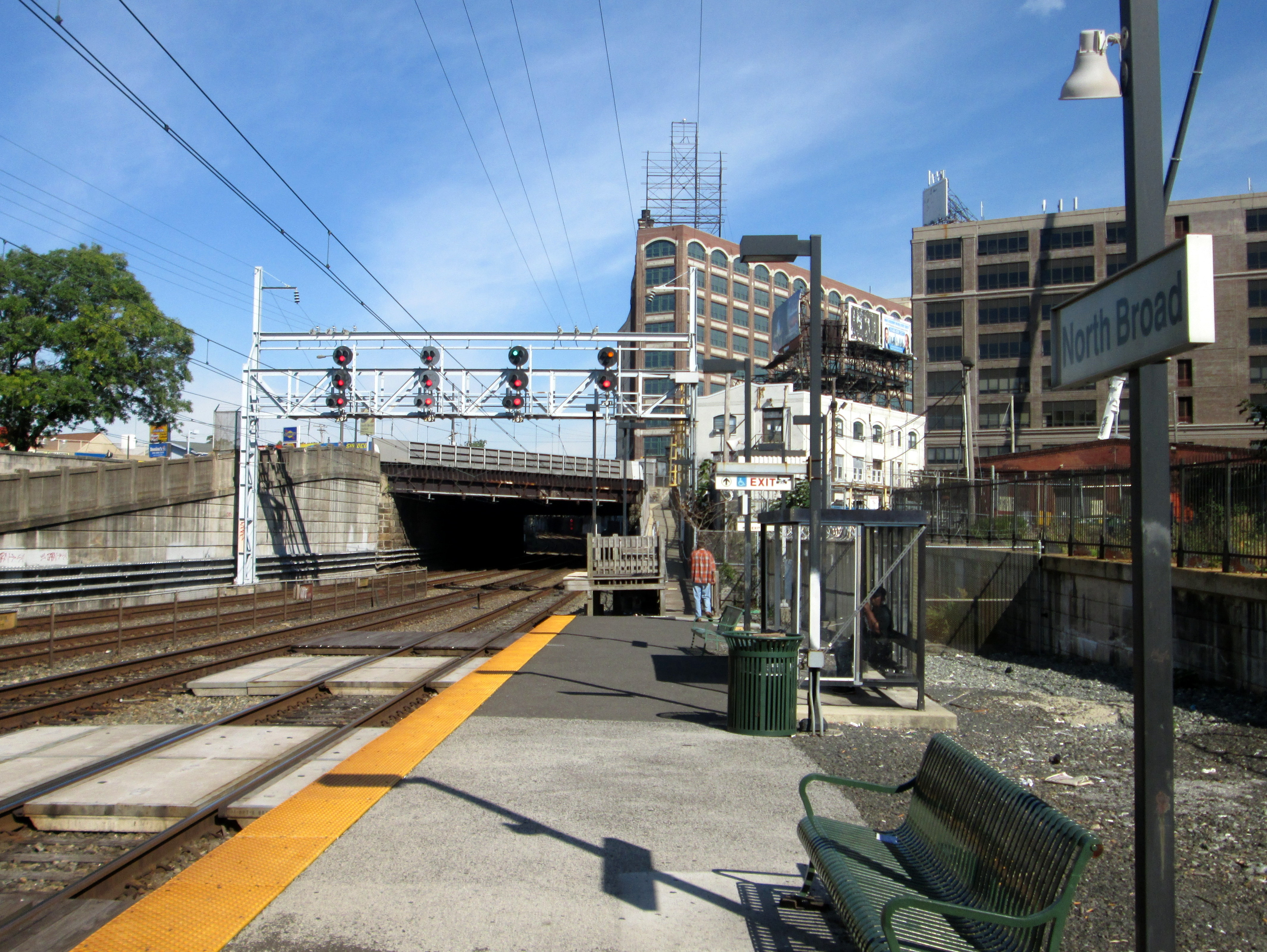
North Broad station in September 2013

On April 5, 1992, SEPTA began their 18-month-long RailWorks project, which included two multi-month shutdowns of the Reading mainline from Wayne Junction to Market East for emergency bridge repairs. As part of the project, North Broad Street and Temple University stations were completely rebuilt. Within two weeks of the closure, demolition of the old platforms was under way. The rebuilt station has two side platforms serving only the outer tracks, which were chosen to straighten the curved tracks around the former island platforms and thus allow higher speeds through the station for express trains. The pedestrian tunnel was closed and filled; access to the platforms is via ramps from North Broad Street. The station, renamed as North Broad, reopened at the end of Railworks on September 5, 1993.

Before RailWorks, North Broad Street served 1,200 riders per day, many of whom were transferring to the Broad Street Line or changing for one of the few trains that stopped at Temple. With the addition of Regional Rail platforms at Fern Rock Transportation Center for RailWorks, substantially more service to Temple through the Center City tunnel after the conclusion of the project, and sharply reduced service due to only having two platform tracks rather than the previous four, the importance of North Broad declined significantly after RailWorks. By 2001, under 300 riders used the station daily.

=== Station building reuse ===
In March 1996, the station building was added to the National Register of Historic Places. That September, Volunteers of America began a $8.3 million renovation to convert the structure into 108 housing units for people transitioning out of homeless shelters. The organization previously had used part of the first floor for adult rehabilitation and counseling programs, but the structure was so deteriorated that only 18% of the floor space was usable. The first residents moved into Station House Apartments in August 1997.
