= Broad–Allegheny station =

Rapid transit station in Philadelphia

Broad–Allegheny
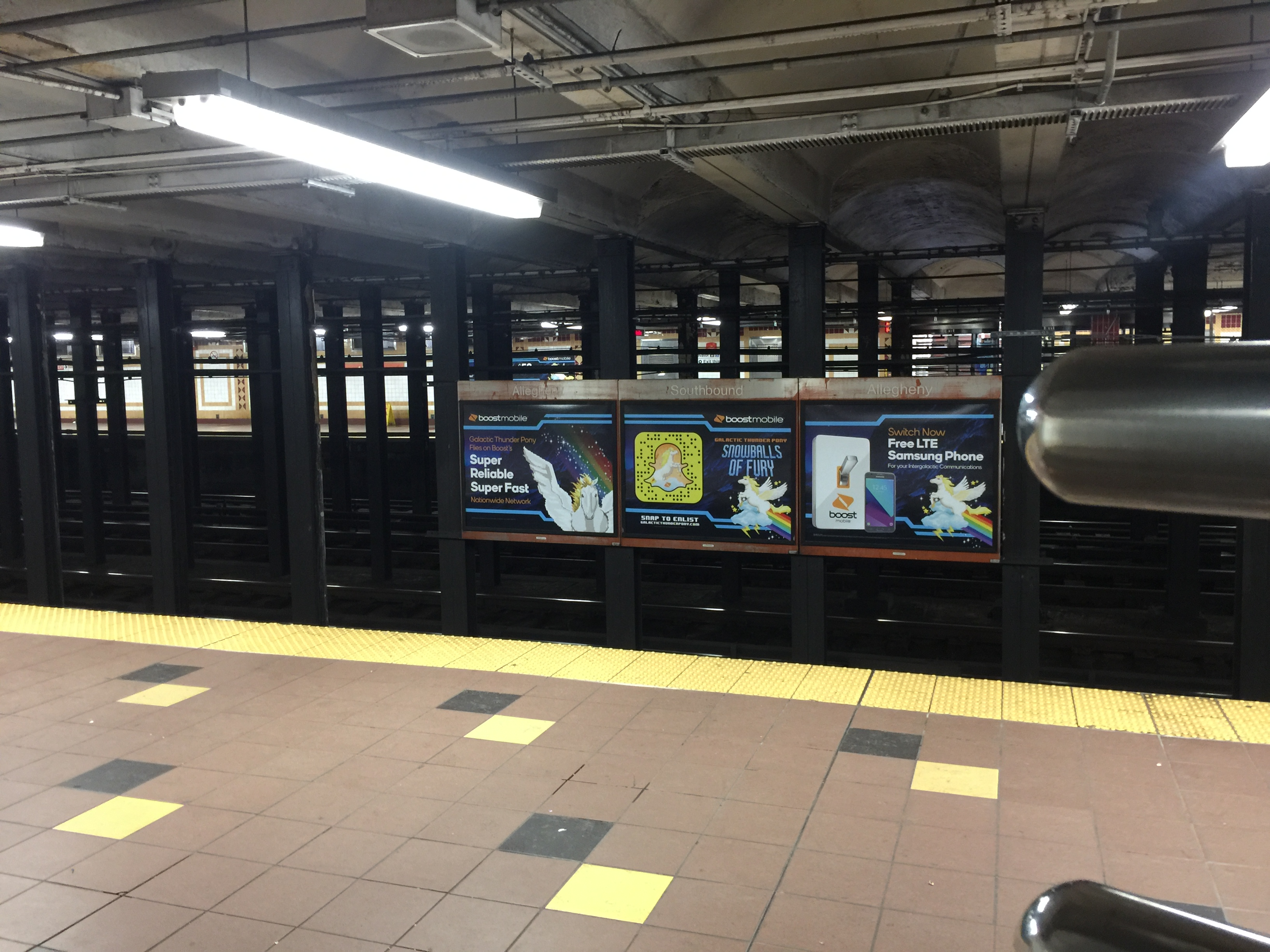
- Broad–Allegheny station platform

General information
- Location: 3200 North Broad Street; Philadelphia, Pennsylvania
- Coordinates: 40°00′06″N 75°09′10″W
- Owner: City of Philadelphia
- Operator: SEPTA
- Platforms: 2 side platforms
- Tracks: 4
- Connections: SEPTA City Bus: 4, 16, 60

Construction
- Structure type: Underground
- Accessible: Yes

History
- Opened: September 1, 1928
- Rebuilt: 2010–2011
- Former names: Allegheny (1928–2025)

Services
Preceding station	SEPTA Metro	Following station
North Philadelphia toward NRG Station	B (SEPTA Metro)	Erie toward Fern Rock T.C.
and do not stop here
Location

Broad–Allegheny station is a rapid transit passenger rail subway station on the SEPTA Metro B. The station is located at 3200 North Broad Street under the intersection of Allegheny Avenue in North Philadelphia, and is strictly for local trains. The station is located next to Temple University's Maurice H. Kornberg School of Dentistry.

== Gallery ==
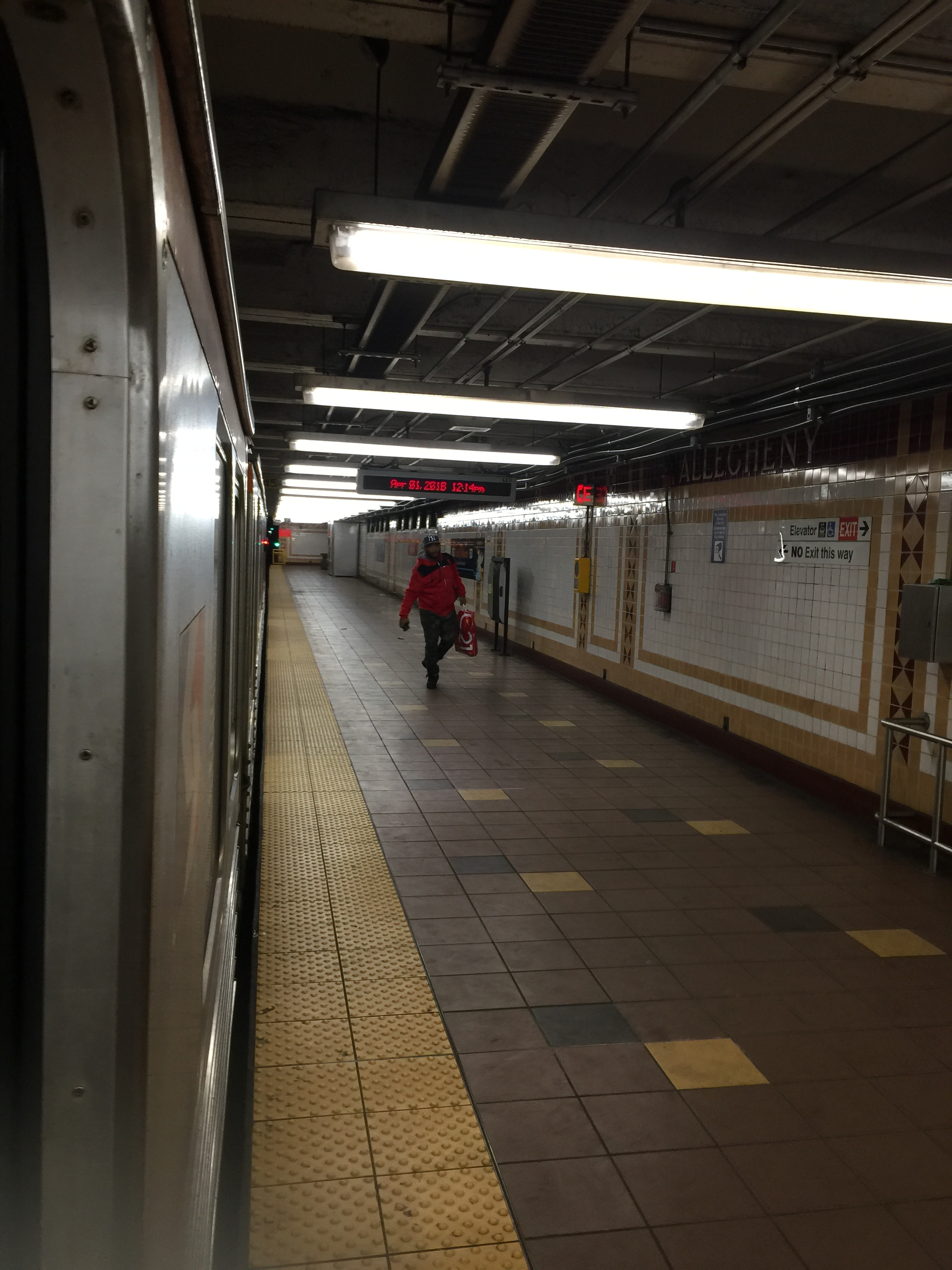
Platform

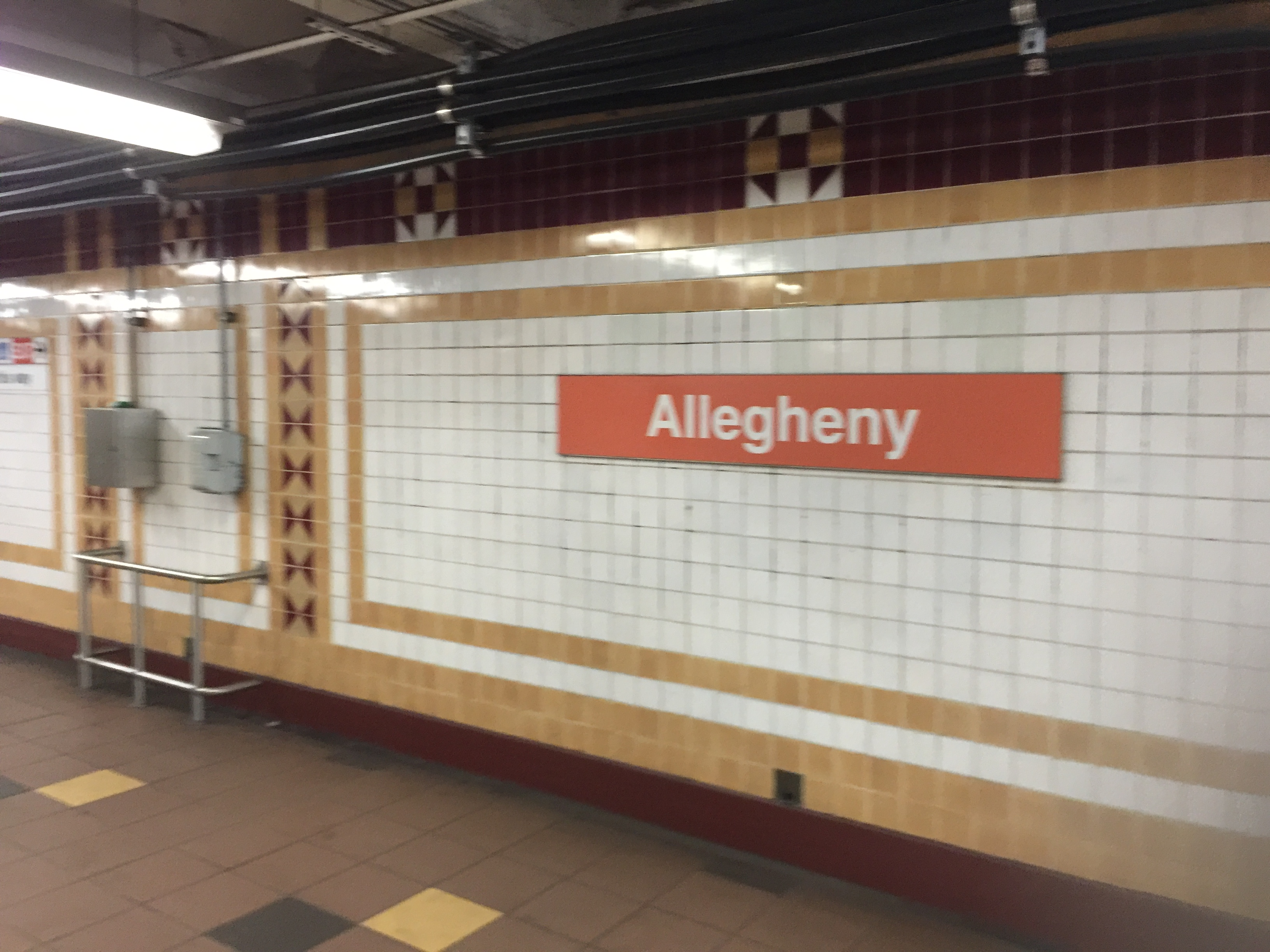
Station sign

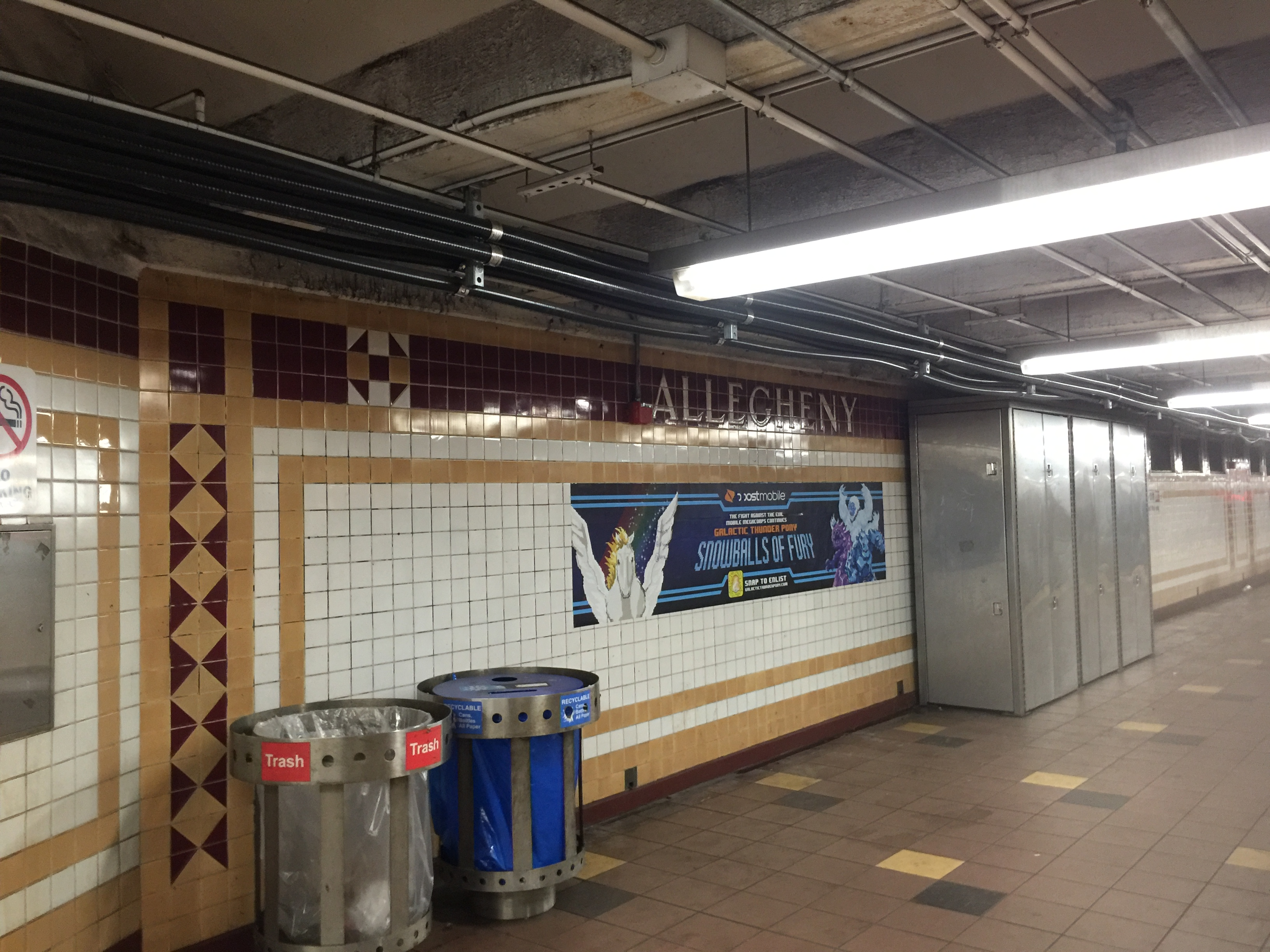
Tile work

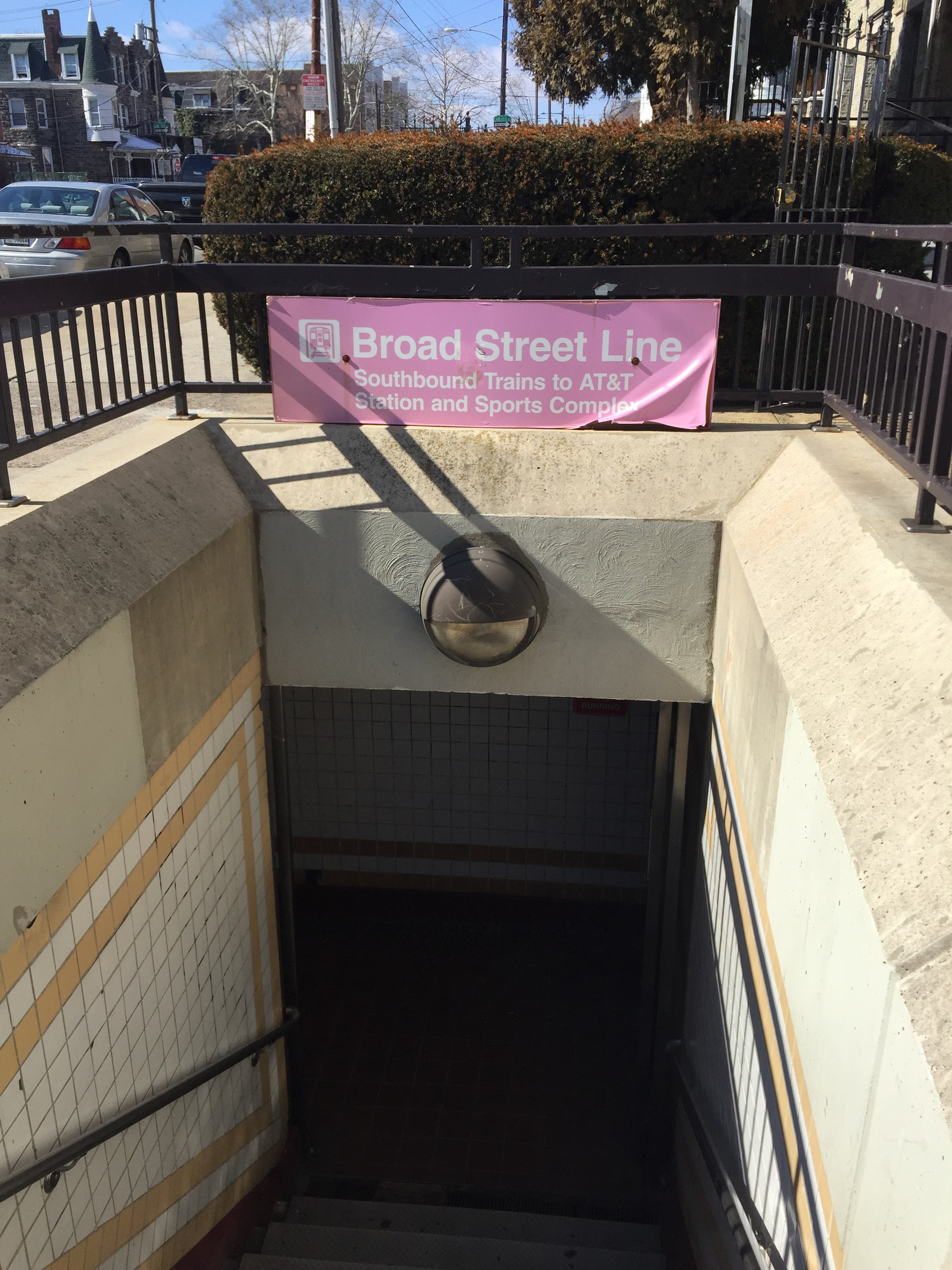
Southbound entrance

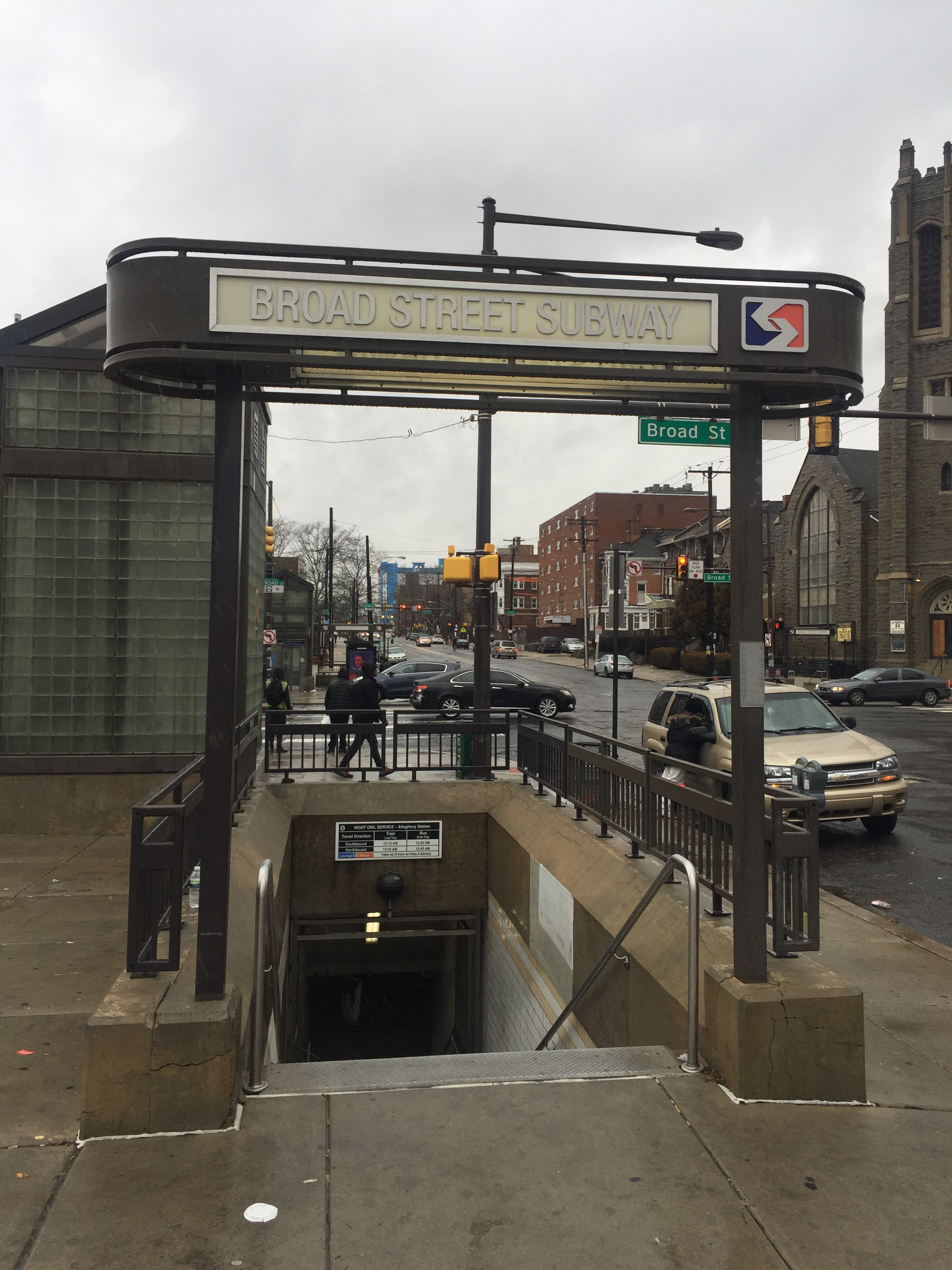
Broad–Allegheny Station entrance

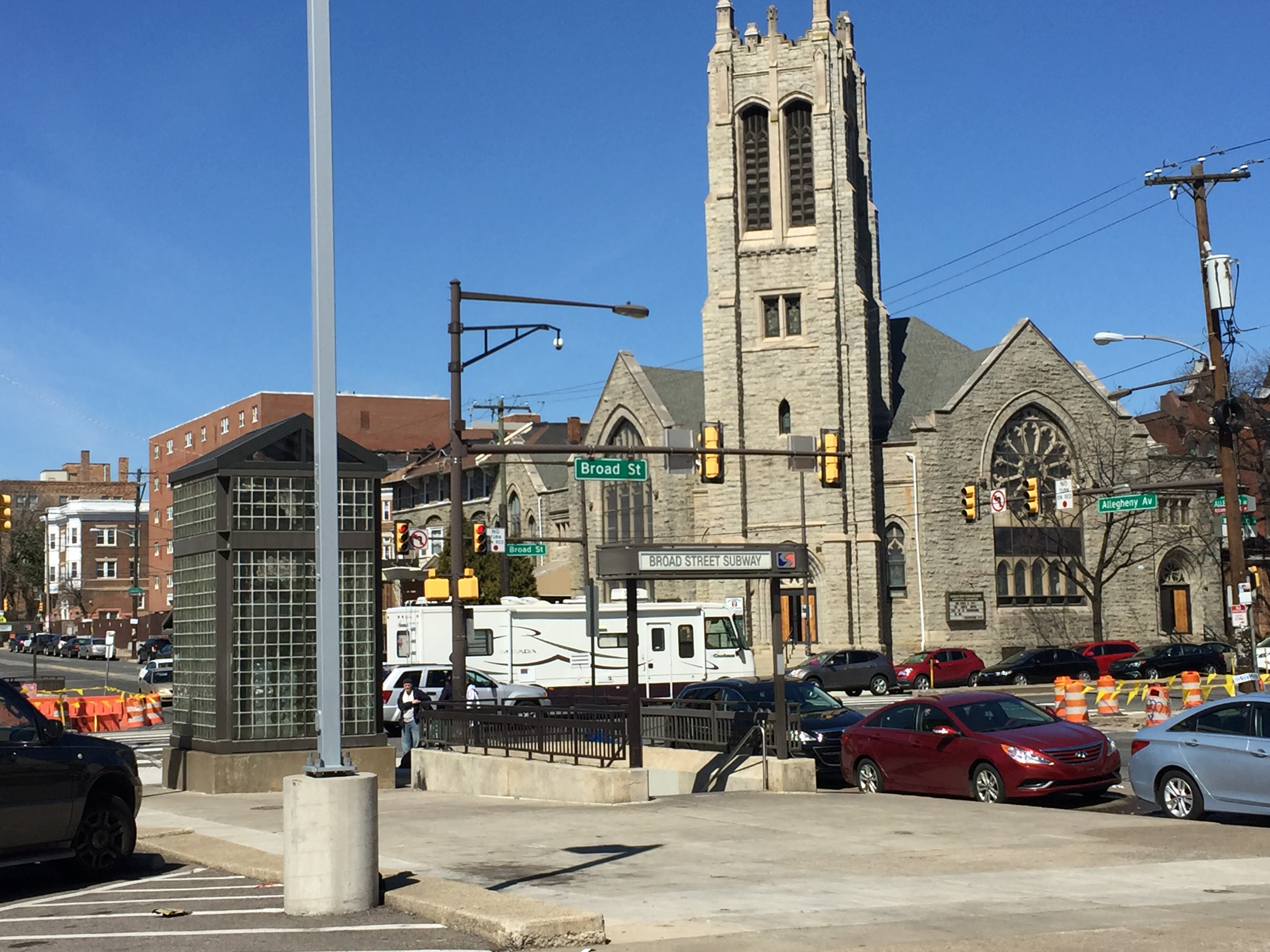
Broad–Allegheny station entrance

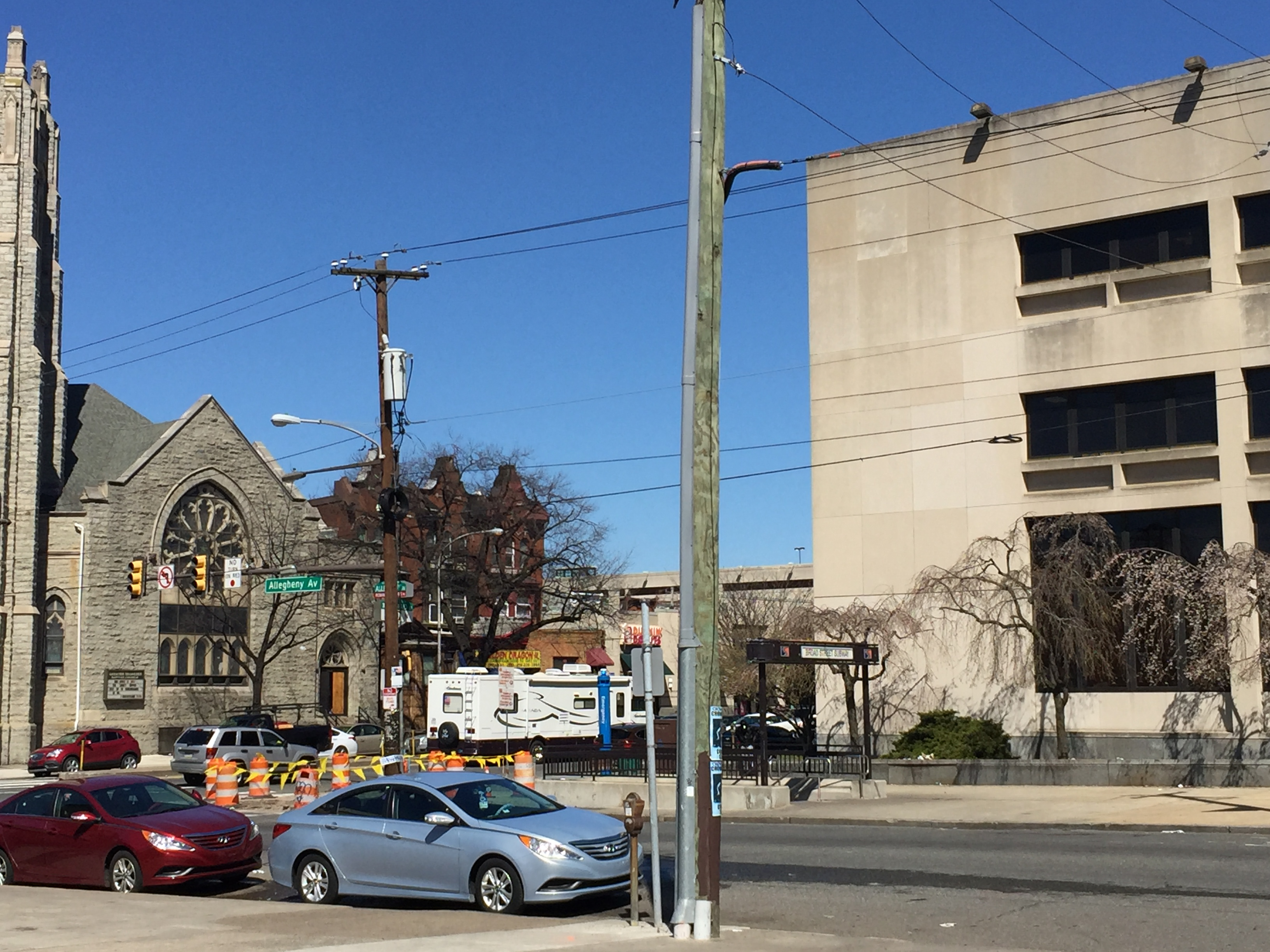
Broad–Allegheny station northeast entrance

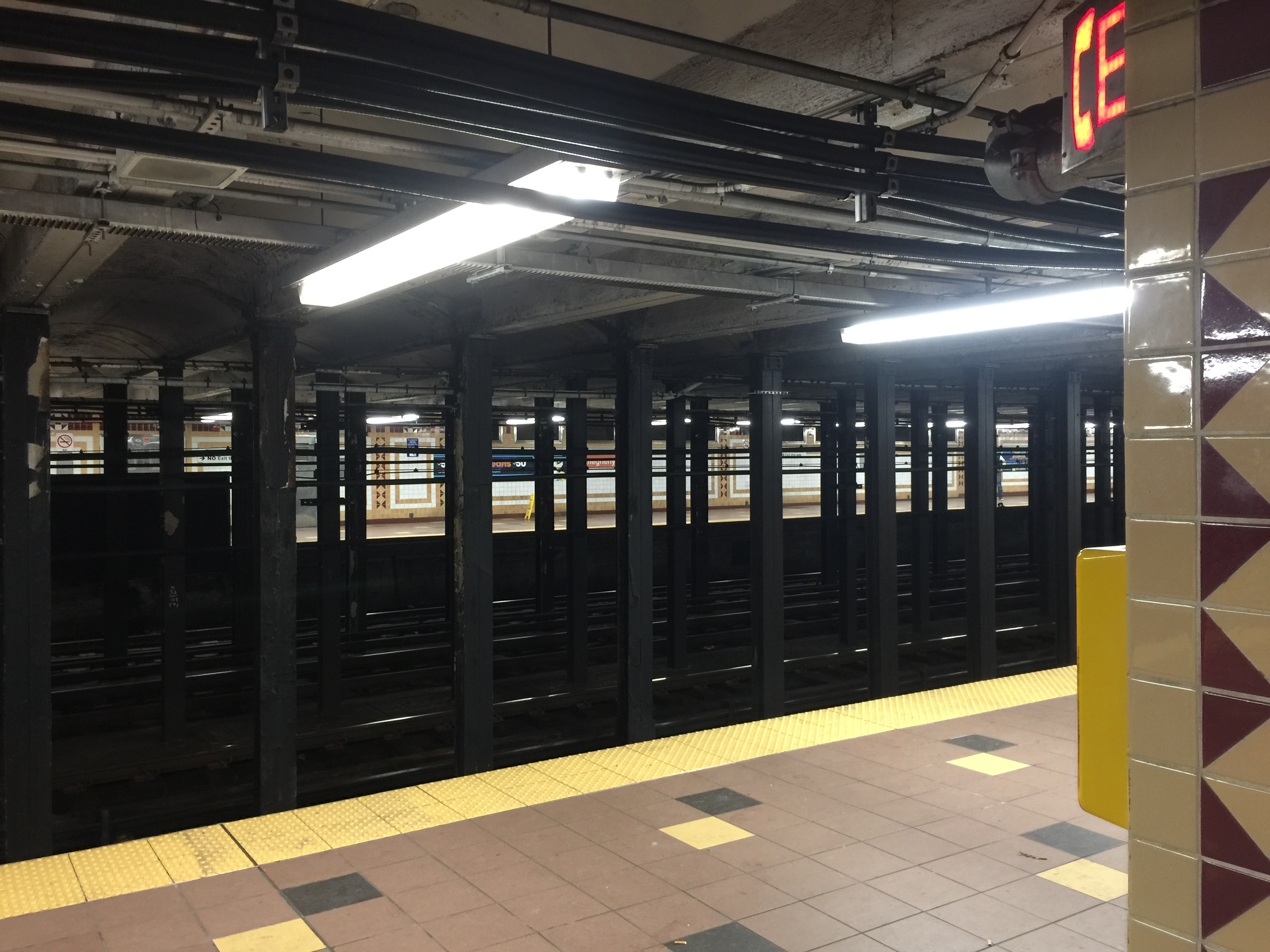
Broad–Allegheny Station Platform north side
