= North Philadelphia station =

Railway station in Philadelphia, Pennsylvania, US

North Philadelphia
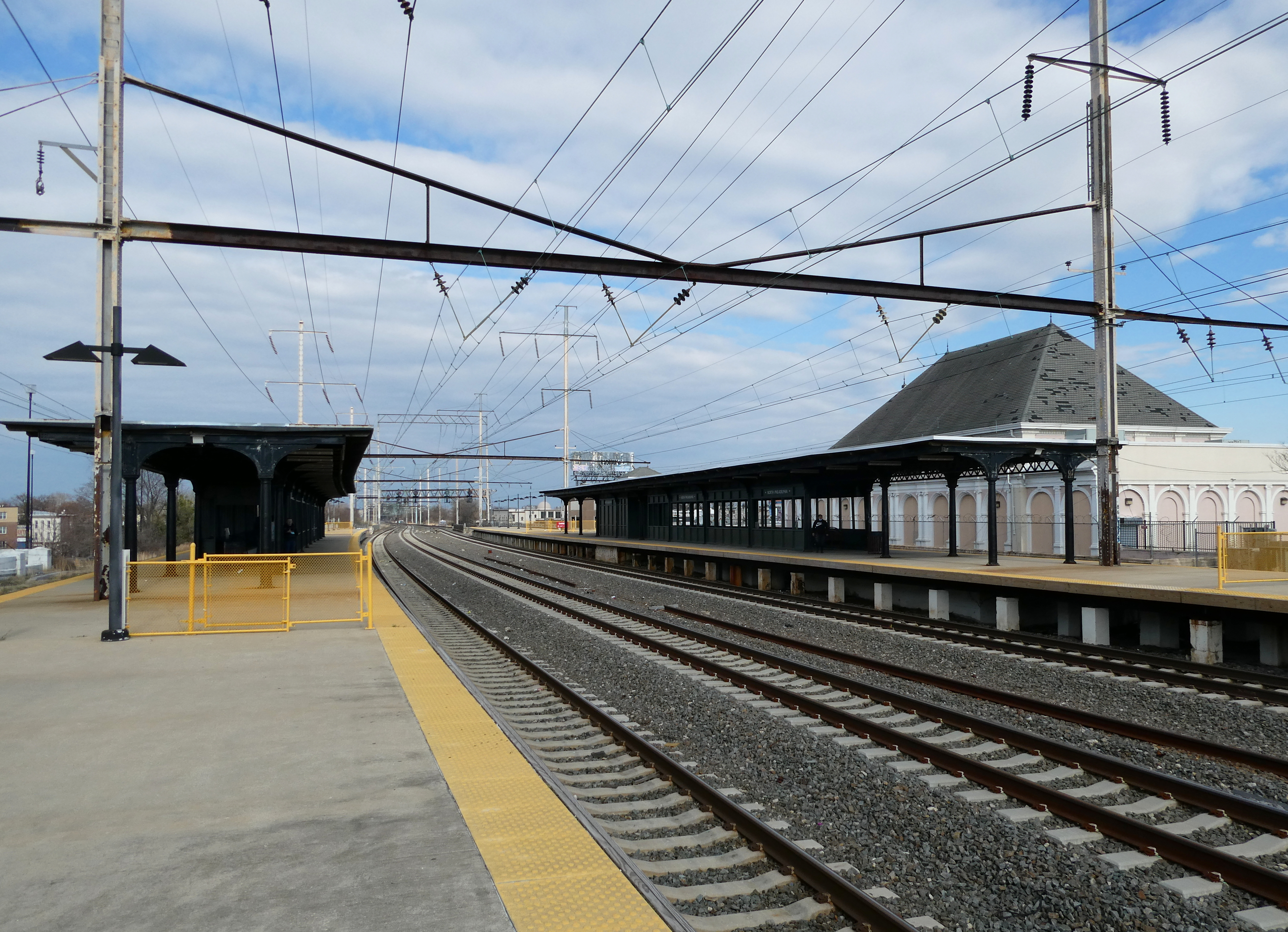
- North Philadelphia station in March 2022

General information
- Location: 2900 North Broad Street (PA-611); Philadelphia, Pennsylvania; United States
- Coordinates: 39°59′51″N 75°9′16″W
- Owner: Amtrak
- Lines: Northeast Corridor; Chestnut Hill West Branch; Delair Branch
- Platforms: 1 side platform, 1 island platform (Northeast Corridor); 2 side platforms (Chestnut Hill West Line)
- Tracks: 5 (Northeast Corridor); 2 (Chestnut Hill West Line)
- Connections: SEPTA Metro: (North Philadelphia); (North Broad); SEPTA City Bus: 4, 16, 54

Construction
- Parking: 333 spaces
- Accessible: No
- Architect: Theophilus P. Chandler Jr. Roydhouse Arey & Co.
- Architectural style: Renaissance

Other information
- Station code: Amtrak: PHN
- IATA code: ZHC
- Fare zone: C (SEPTA)

History
- Opened: 1870s (original station)
- Rebuilt: May 1896 – April 1901 (current station); 1912–1915, 1955, 1977, 1991
- Former names: New York Junction; Germantown Junction

Passengers
- 2013: 184 daily boardings (SEPTA)
- FY 2025: 1,503 annually (Amtrak)

Services
Preceding station	Amtrak	Following station
Philadelphia toward Harrisburg	Keystone Service Limited service	Cornwells Heights toward New York
Preceding station	SEPTA	Following station
30th Street Station toward Temple University	Chestnut Hill West Line	Queen Lane toward Chestnut Hill West
30th Street Station toward Temple University	Trenton Line	Bridesburg toward Trenton
Former services
Preceding station	Amtrak	Following station
Paoli toward Kansas City	National Limited	Trenton toward New York
Philadelphia toward Richmond Staples Mill Road, Harrisburg or Springfield	Atlantic City Express	Cherry Hill toward Atlantic City
Philadelphia toward Washington, D.C.	Montrealer	Trenton toward Montreal
Preceding station	Pennsylvania Railroad	Following station
Philadelphia toward Chicago	Main Line	Frankford toward New York or Exchange Place
Philadelphia toward Suburban Station	Trenton Line	North Penn Junction toward Trenton
Westmoreland toward Chestnut Hill	Chestnut Hill Line	Philadelphia toward Suburban Station
Westmoreland toward White Marsh	Fort Washington Branch	Philadelphia toward Suburban Station
- Germantown Junction Station
- U.S. National Register of Historic Places
- Interactive map of Germantown Junction Station
- NRHP reference No.: 92000940
- Added to NRHP: July 8, 1999
Location

North Philadelphia station is an intercity rail and regional rail station on the Northeast Corridor, located on North Broad Street in the North Philadelphia neighborhood of Philadelphia, Pennsylvania, United States. SEPTA Regional Rail's Trenton Line and Chestnut Hill West Line account for most of the station's service. Three Amtrak trains, two southbound and one northbound, stop on weekdays only.

The station opened in the 1870s and was known as New York Junction and Germantown Junction. A new station, which ushered in the Beaux-Arts style for large train stations, was built from 1896 to 1901. After a 1912–1915 enlargement, it was renamed as North Philadelphia. Despite several other renovations, its use declined in the mid and late 20th century; in 1991, Amtrak constructed a smaller replacement station across the tracks. The building was renovated once more in 1999 and is now used as commercial space. It was added to the National Register of Historic Places the same year.

== Layout and service ==
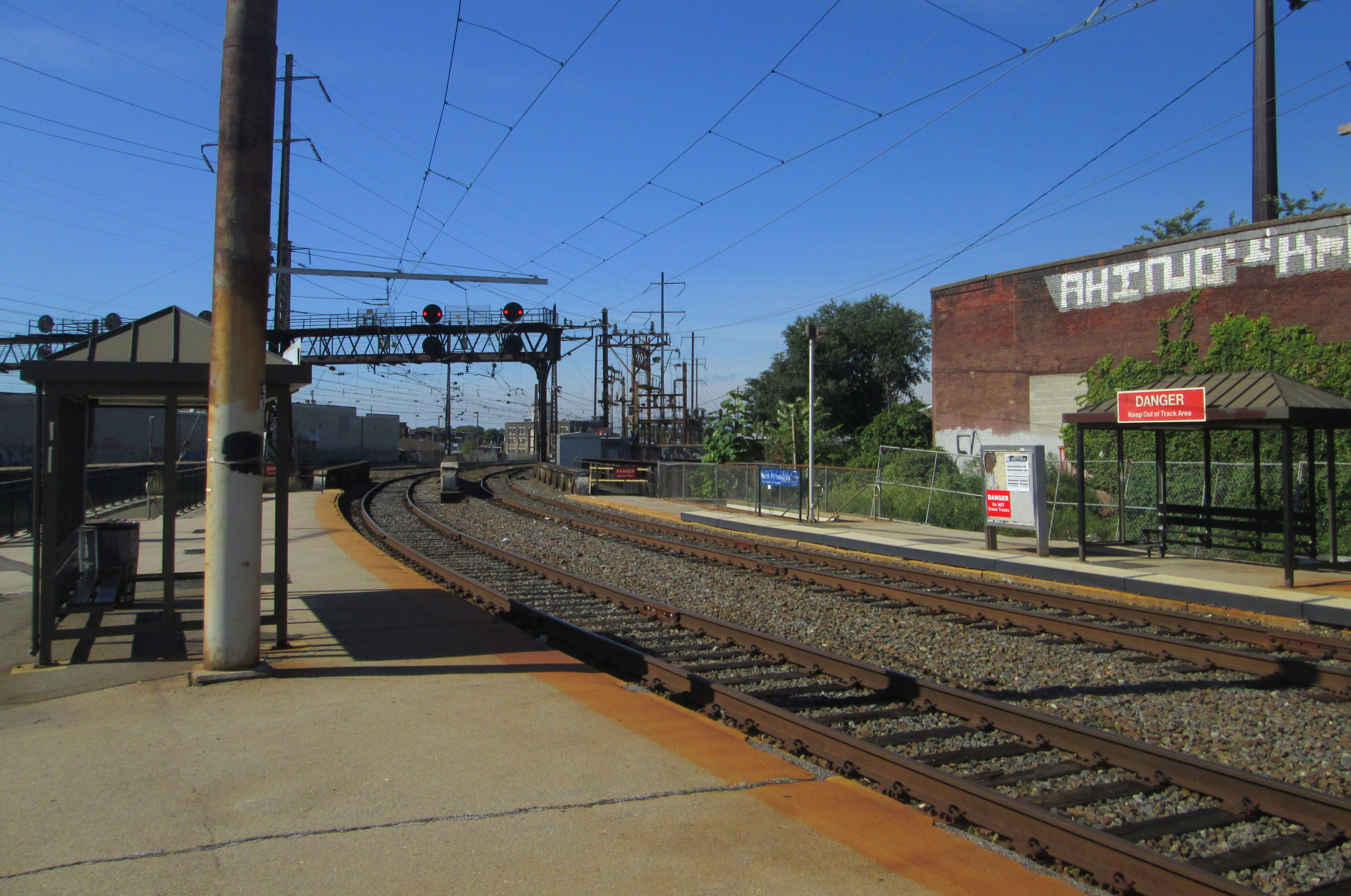
Platforms for the Chestnut Hill West Line

Two high-level island platforms serve three of the four Northeast Corridor passenger tracks; there is a center passing track, as well as a fifth track on the south side that is only used by CSX and Norfolk Southern freights (the Delair Branch). Most SEPTA Trenton Line trains and four daily weekday-only Amtrak trains (one northbound and three southbound) stop at these platforms. Two low-level platforms, a short distance to the west, serve the diverging SEPTA-owned Chestnut Hill West Branch. North Philadelphia has been a flag stop on the line since 1993. The station has relatively few inbound boardings; however, it is used by riders from the Chestnut Hill West Line transferring to SEPTA and Amtrak trains to reach jobs in New Jersey and New York.

The station is within a few blocks of the North Broad station on SEPTA's Main Line (formerly belonging to the Reading Company), and the North Philadelphia subway station on SEPTA's Broad Street Line.

== History and architecture ==
=== Germantown Junction ===
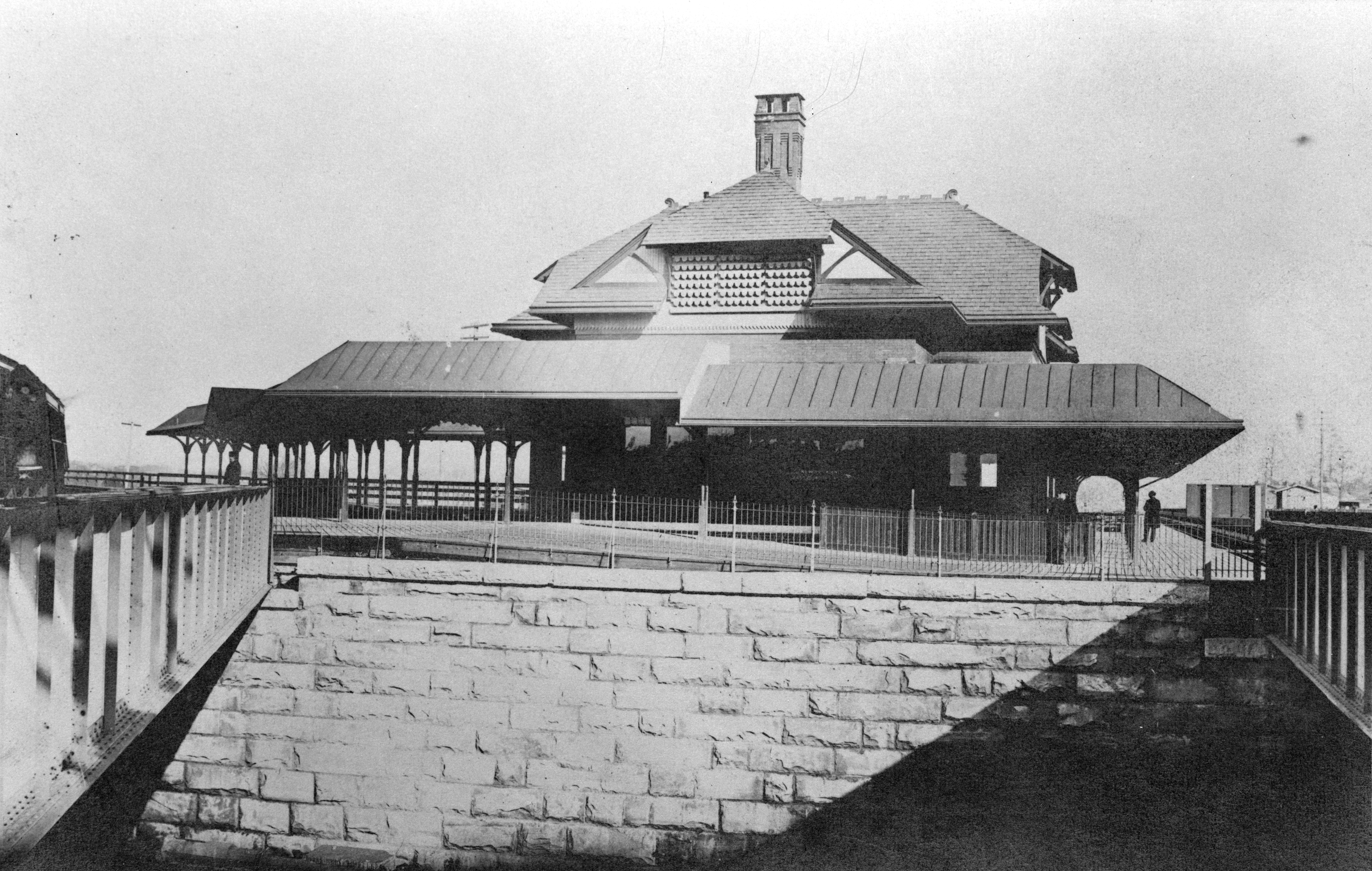
Germantown Junction station before 1896

The Pennsylvania Railroad (PRR) built the Connecting Railway in 1867 to connect its main line to the Philadelphia and Trenton Railroad. By the early 1870s, New York Junction station was established where the Connecting Railway crossed over the Philadelphia and Reading Railroad mainline in North Philadelphia. A signal tower, still extant, was constructed around this time.

By the early 1880s, the PRR station was known as Germantown Junction, while the Reading had its 16th Street station a block to the northwest (and after 1890, Huntingdon Street station to the southeast). Germantown Junction station was a two-story Queen Anne style building located between the diverging lines; its large gables acted as shelters for passengers.

=== A new station needed ===
By the mid 1890s, the station was frequently overcrowded and North Philadelphia and the northern suburbs grew in population. The completion of the Delair Bridge in 1896 allowed passengers to ride trains directly to the summer resorts of southern New Jersey (rather than taking a ferry to Camden) further increased traffic on the line. George B. Roberts, president of the railroad, used his social connections to hire Theophilus Parsons Chandler Jr. to construct a new station. The new station was constructed on a former freight yard on the south side of the tracks (across from the previous station), where there was more space for the station. The site also provided better connections for passengers using newly electrified streetcars on Glenwood Avenue and North Broad Street to reach the station.

Foundation construction began in May 1896. However, work was stopped when Roberts took ill in August; he died the next January. The Panic of 1896 led Roberts' successor, Frank Thomson, not to continue work. When Thomson died in 1899, Alexander Cassatt was recalled to the PRR to serve as president. Cassatt immediately began a major capital improvement program, which included both adding capacity to mainlines and constructing large stations including Washington Union Station and New York Penn Station. Work resumed in 1900 with an enlarged floor plan, and the new station was complete in April 1901.

=== Architecture ===
Previous PRR stations were generally in the picturesque eclectic style common among 19th-century railroads stations, like the Victorian eclectic Overbrook station and the Furness-style Broad Street Station. Germantown Junction was the first station along the Northeast Corridor to be constructed in the Châteauesque style, and it ushered in the Beaux Arts style used by the Pennsylvania and other railroads during the early 20th century.

As constructed, the main facade of the station faced Glenwood Avenue. The two-story entrance loggia consisted of seven arched bays, with a three-bay wing to the northeast and a two-bay wing to the southwest, and acted as a transition point between the street and the station interior. The first floor (at track level) featured a large waiting room occupying the entire center block, with vault lights providing natural illumination and a fountain set into the western wall. Restrooms, a kitchen, and a cafe occupied the wings.

The basement housed the boiler room, a smaller waiting room, kitchen storerooms, and baggage rooms. The station appears to have had two side platforms serving four tracks, accessed through a basement-level tunnel that was reached from the main waiting room by a staircase. The steep roof over the center block had several dormers, some of which were later removed. A covered ramp from the west wing, which had direct access from the south platform, led to a small trolley station on Glenwood Avenue.

=== North Philadelphia ===
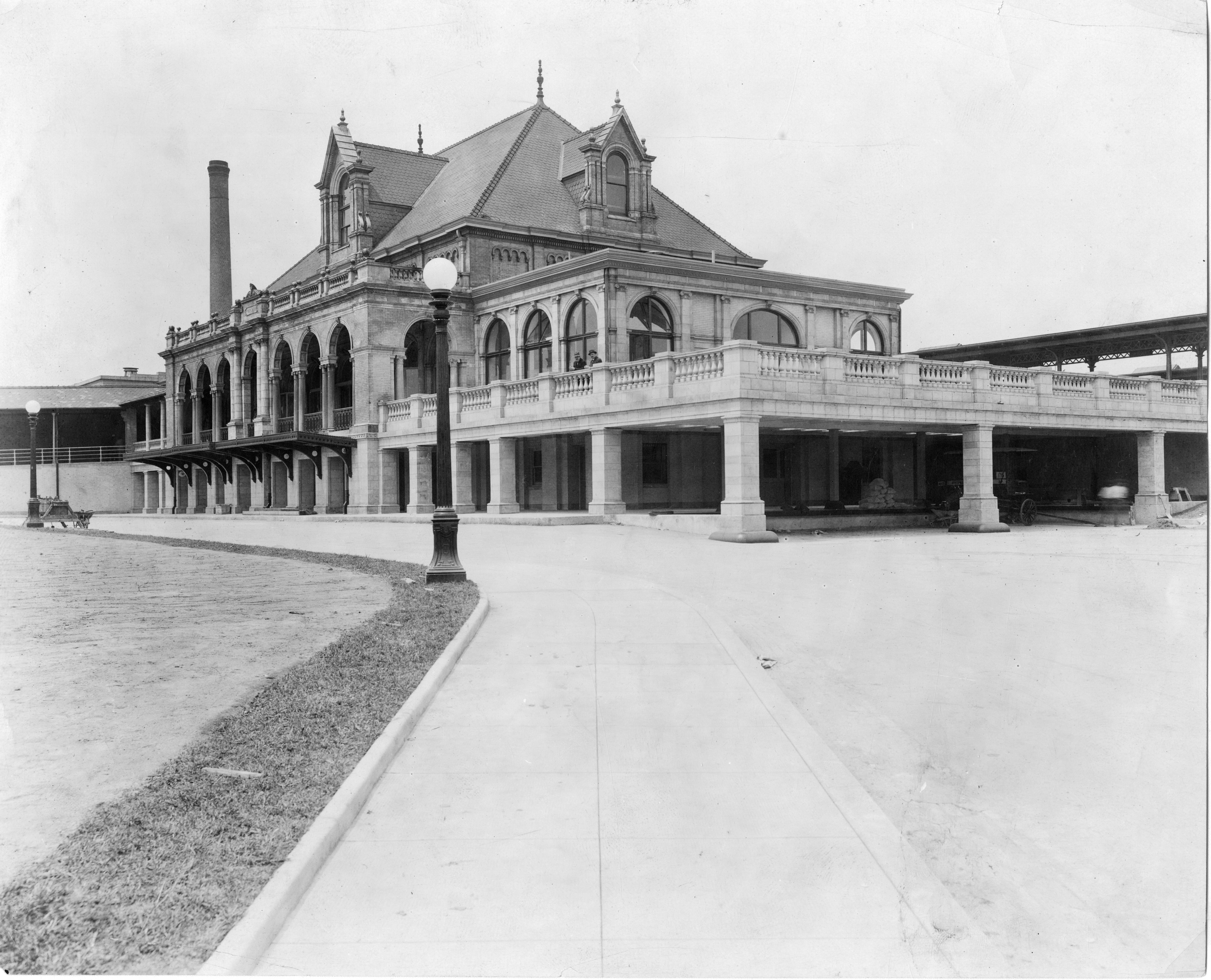
North Philadelphia station in 1915 after the completion of alterations including the adaptation of the original basement as the new entrance level

After construction, the station served as the PRR's sole Philadelphia stop for most long-distance east-west Main Line traffic to avoid a reverse move into Broad Street Station (and later 30th Street Station). It also served local trains from Fort Washington, Chestnut Hill, Bustleton, and Trenton, as well as a variety of services from the PRR-owned West Jersey and Seashore Railroad system. Within a decade of completion, the station was already overcrowded. On June 22, 1912, the PRR signed a million-dollar contract for massive renovations to the station. Designed by PRR architect William H. Cookman, the modifications reflected the latest in passenger station design.

The ground was lowered by a full story on the south and east sides of the station, exposing what had formerly been the basement to improve access for taxis and private automobiles. A marquee to shelter arriving and departing passengers spanned the seven central bays of the lower level, with a more ornate version on the north end of the pedestrian tunnel. The lower waiting room was expanded, a ticket office constructed, and a larger staircase to the main waiting room was built. The floor was covered with terrazzo and green marble, with white marble wainscoting on the walls. Three bays were added to the west wing for additional functional space, removing direct track access from the ramp. Cast iron streetlights with the PRR Keystone motif in their base were located around the driveway and grounds.

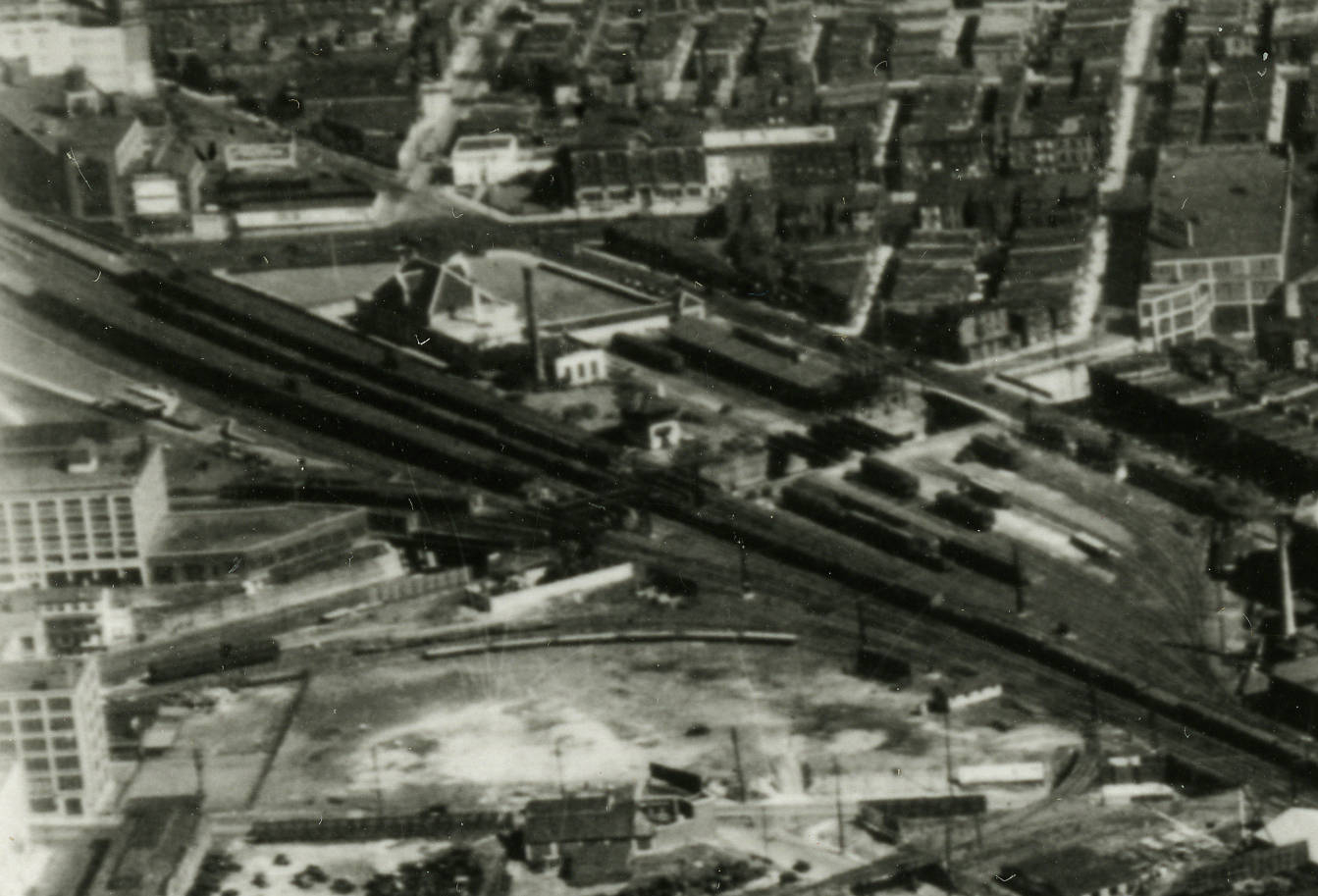
Aerial view of North Philadelphia station and surrounding areas in 1929

The original side platforms were replaced with high-level island platforms, long enough to permit level boarding for twelve-car trains. The platforms and platform supports were constructed of cast-in-place concrete. The line was widened to eight tracks through the station, with the platforms between the 2nd and 3rd tracks and the 6th and 7th tracks. The center non-platform tracks were reserved for through freights, with the outside non-platform tracks used by local freights. Each platform had a 10-foot (3.0 m)-wide waiting room, 60 feet (18 m) long on the eastbound (south) platform and 80 feet (24 m) long on the westbound platform. The waiting rooms were covered in copper sheathing and had large skylights. The railroad constructed full-length steel platform canopies in their own shops. A separate baggage tunnel, west of the main passenger tunnel, connected with freight elevators to the platforms. When the renovations were complete in 1915, the station was renamed as North Philadelphia.

=== Decline ===
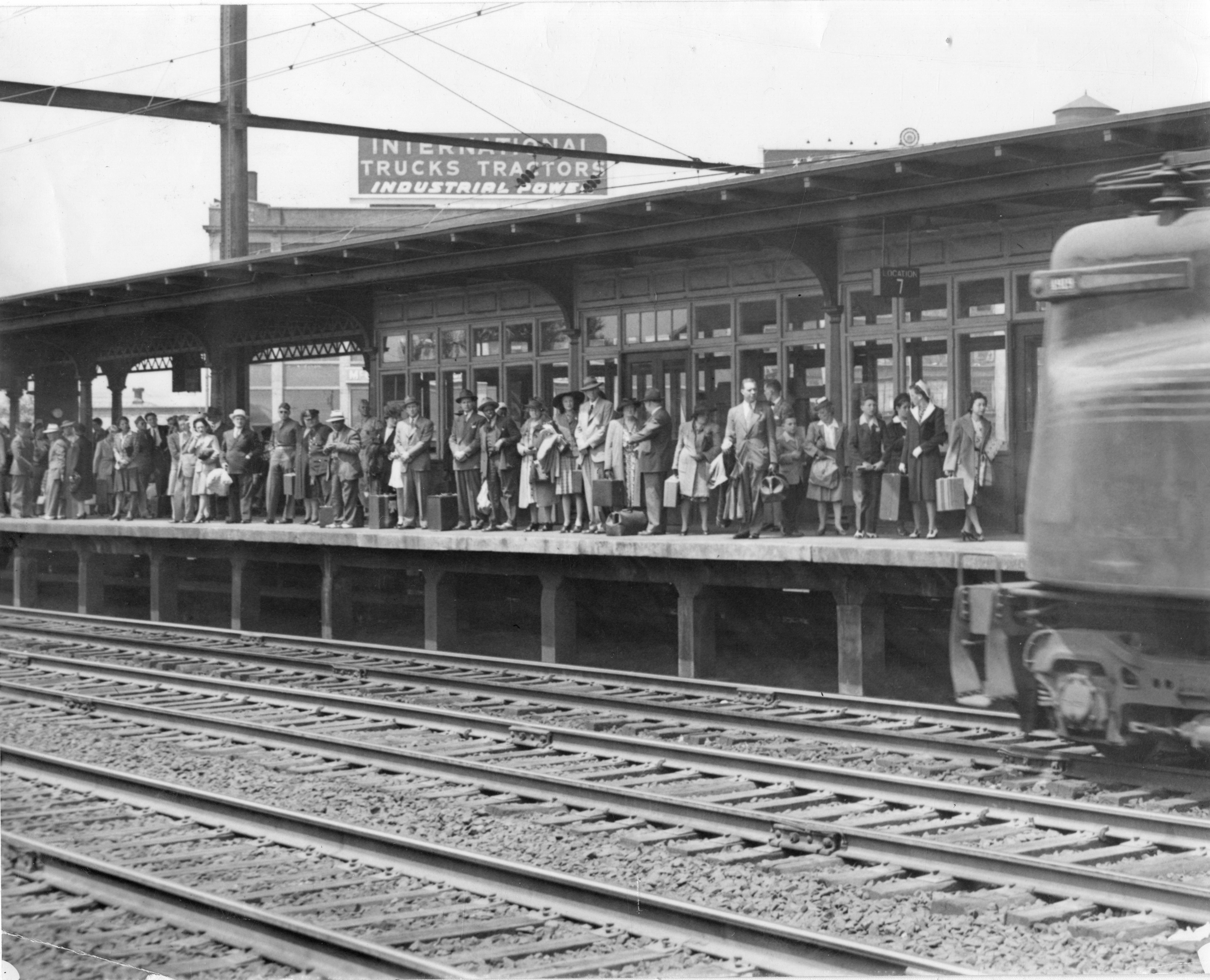
A PRR train arrives at the station in 1943

North Philadelphia continued to grow during the early 20th century as a popular residential area for the nouveau riche rejected by old money society. Two ballparks (the Baker Bowl and Shibe Park) were located nearby, as were new cultural institutions and automotive industry buildings. In 1928, the Broad Street Subway was opened with a station at North Philadelphia, offering more frequent service to Center City. Its northern entrances were located at the intersection of Glenwood Avenue and North Broad Street, with an underground passage offering an easy connection to the PRR station. The Reading Company replaced Huntingdon Avenue station with North Broad Street station, a massive Classical Revival structure rivaling the PRR station in grandeur. 30th Street Station opened in 1933, reducing North Philadelphia's importance for north-south services. However, North Philadelphia continued to serve heavy commuter traffic and east-west long-distance trains.

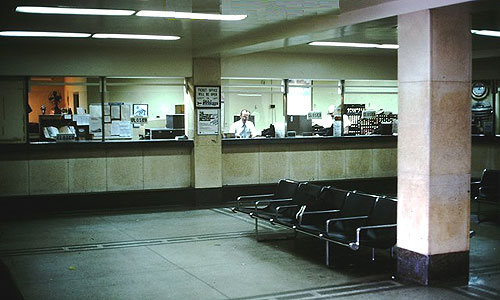
The lower level ticket counter in 1978

An interior rearrangement was completed around 1942. The women's room for the main waiting room was moved from the east side to the west side, with one bay added to the west wing. A new dining area was constructed, occupying one-third of the waiting room, with its kitchen occupying the former bathroom space. The lunch cafe and staircases were also modified.

After World War II, North Philadelphia suffered from the failure of its industries, and the PRR reduced both local and long-distance service due to competition from private autos, further reducing the importance of the station. Escalators and a new drop ceiling were added around 1955, the former due to the insistence of the city council. The surrounding parking lots and ground were rearranged in 1968.

In 1977, after a fire in March 1976, Amtrak undertook a $314,000 rehabilitation of the station. The roof and portico were rebuilt, two of the three dormers removed, new restrooms added, and the platform and waiting room repaired. The loggia, windows, and other openings were covered with cinderblocks and brick.

=== New station and reuse ===
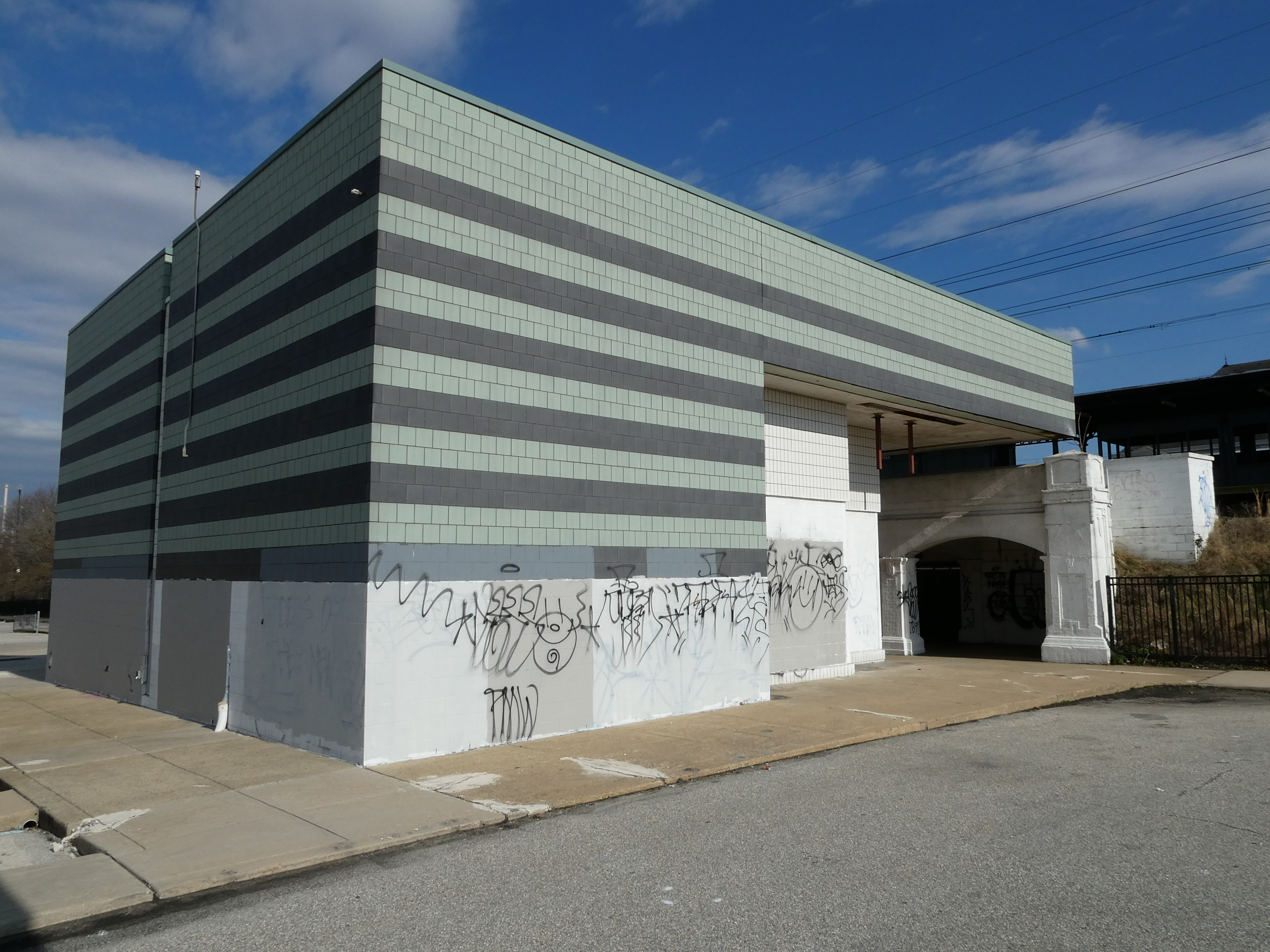
The 1991-constructed station building in 2022

In the 1980s, the city and Amtrak attempted to fund a second renovation with a private partner, but plans fell through. In 1991, Amtrak constructed a rectangular concrete and glass station building on the north side of the tracks, in front of the passenger tunnel. Access from the south was blocked off. In 1999, the original station building was renovated at a cost of $7 million for use as commercial space. The front parking lot was expanded on a slope to the west; it covered much of the ground level (similar to the station before 1915). The mechanical building and the covered ramp to the trolley station were removed. A strip mall was built just to the east, with balustrades and archways referencing the historic station. The passageway from the subway station, long closed, was likely buried at this time. The 1901-built station building was listed on the National Register of Historic Places on July 8, 1999.

The Amtrak ticket office was closed in April 2001 as part of austerity measures. Vandalism also forced the closure of elevators. The same year, SEPTA proposed closing the station because it served few inbound commuters. However, advocacy from the Delaware Valley Association of Rail Passengers, which showed that the station was more heavily used by commuters from the Chestnut Hill West Line changing to SEPTA Trenton Line trains and Amtrak Clockers to Trenton and New York, succeeded in persuading SEPTA to keep the station open for the time being. By 2005, no official decision had been made to permanently keep the station, but SEPTA planned repairs to the deteriorated platforms.

In 2010, a renovation of North Philadelphia subway station was completed. This included restoring the Glenwood Avenue headhouses, closed for decades before, which improved connections to the mainline station.
