= Tastykake =

American food company

Coordinates: 40°00′26″N 75°10′31″W

Tasty Baking Company
- Type: Wholly owned subsidiary
- Traded as: NYSE: TBC (1961–2005); Nasdaq: TSTY (2005–2011)
- Industry: Food production
- Founded: 1914; 112 years ago
- Headquarters: Philadelphia, Pennsylvania, U.S., United States
- Area served: Mid-Atlantic, Northeastern United States
- Key people: John Padgett, Former President and CEO
- Products: Krimpets, Kandy Kakes, Cupcakes, Pies, Koffee Kakes, Donuts, Cookie Bars, Juniors, Kreamies
- Number of employees: Approx. 1000
- Parent: Flowers Foods
- Website: www.tastykake.com

Tastykake is a line of snack foods manufactured by the Tasty Baking Company, headquartered at the Philadelphia Navy Yard (formerly the Philadelphia Naval Shipyard) in Philadelphia, Pennsylvania. Established in 1914 by Philip J. Baur and Herbert T. Morris and originally selling its product only in the Philadelphia metropolitan area, the company now distributes its products in several states on the East Coast, including Florida, and has been gradually expanding across the United States.

In April 2010, Tasty Baking entered into a purchase-and-sale agreement with John Padgett Associates and its guarantor, Metro Development Company, for the sale of its Philadelphia bakery property located at Hunting Park Avenue, and its former corporate offices and distribution center located at Fox Street, for $6 million.

== Products ==
Tastykake produces a variety of pastries including cupcakes, donuts, honey buns, and pies.

== History ==
Philip J. Baur and Herbert T. Morris founded the company, in the Germantown neighborhood along Sedgley Avenue, with an initial investment of $50,000, equal to $1,607,143 today. First, Baur and Morris had opened a bakery in the Pittsburgh area, selling it to the Ward Baking Company in 1913. When Baur and Morris sold to Ward, the terms of the sale prohibited them from opening another bakery within 100 miles of Pittsburgh, so the partners looked instead to Philadelphia. In November 1913 they settled on the Sedgley Avenue location. Morris's wife came up with the Tastykake name. A Boston student created the Tastykake girl and logo. Then, the company adopted the slogan, "The Cake That Made Mother Stop Baking."

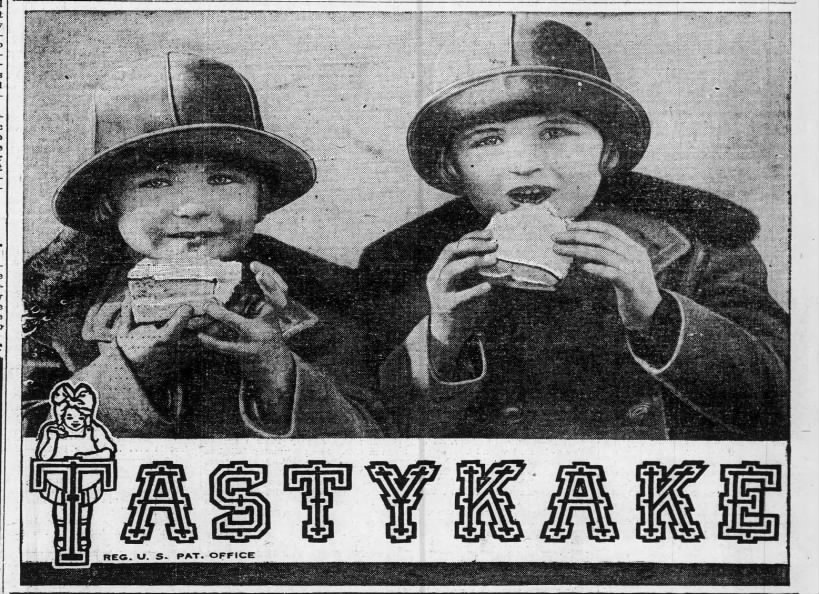
1926 newspaper ad for Tasttkake products

Tasty Baking Company quickly established success for its Tasty brand, selling $28 worth of cakes at ten cents a piece on its first day of sales, $222 in the first week and grossing $300,000 in sales by the end of 1914. Sales began to expand throughout Eastern Pennsylvania. Until 1941 the company distributed its products almost wholly by horse-drawn delivery wagons, making them an exclusive city treat. But World War II changed all that as the company sent thousands of cakes and pies overseas to soldiers in both the European and Pacific/Asian theaters, vastly expanding its market. Over the years, Tastykake expanded its distribution through many modes of transportation including trucks, electric cars, rails and ships, selling its products in Western Pennsylvania, Virginia and New York. Tastykake retired their last horse in 1941. The Tastykake brand identity expanded further and sales doubled in the late 1950s and early 1960s when the company installed state-of-the-art machinery that cut the baking cycle from twelve hours to forty-five minutes.

Philip Baur died in 1951, his heirs purchased stock from Herbert Morris' wife, giving the Baur family majority control of the company. Vice-President Paul R. Kaiser became president, and Morris, who had served as president since the company's inception, became chairman of the board. In April 1954, Kaiser was able to report that the Tastykake territory had grown to cover parts of nine states and the District of Columbia. By the end of the decade, annual sales had grown to nearly $22.9 million.

== 1959 boycott ==
In 1959, a group from Philadelphia who referred to themselves as the 400 ministers formulated a new strategy for using black consumer power, rather than the city's liberal civil rights networks, to press private employers to improve job opportunities for black workers. Led by Reverend Leon Sullivan, the group believed it was important that the public be conditioned to seeing African Americans doing more than menial jobs in the community.

The local branch had approached the management of Tastykake, about employing black workers in the lucrative position of "driver-salesman". Driver-salesmen both drove the company's delivery trucks and sold the company's goods to grocery stores and other retail outlets and thus were able to earn lucrative commissions on top of their salaries. Although the activists' talks with Tastykake were cordial, most refused to change their employment policies. Since Tastykake had failed to respond to their entreaties, the ministers declared that they intended to stop buying the company's snack foods and they hoped their congregants would join them.

On June 16, the ministers announced that Tastykake was to be the target of the first selective patronage campaign and that Sullivan would serve as spokesperson and chief negotiator for the campaign. Tastykake was known for hiring a large number of black workers, even though it restricted them to certain production departments and was rumored to require them to use segregated restroom and locker facilities. The company's products were very popular among African American neighborhoods and therefore profitable for both Tastykake and the black owned groceries stores. The key to the boycott's success would be to convince 150 black grocery chains to stop selling the lucrative product for the bigger cause of fair employment practices for black workers. With hand made signs in windows declaring the refusal to sell the products, Sullivan and the ministers were successful in unifying the black communities. Tastykake finally agreed to negotiate with the ministers. On August 7, 1959, the ministers announced the end to the boycott. The company's black drivers now had fixed routes, African American women were working in positions previously reserved for white women, and all of the plants' facilities had been desegregated.

== Product history ==
In 1927 Tastykake introduced its Butterscotch Krimpet and soon thereafter a line of individually wrapped fruit and cream pies, all of which were bundled in wax-paper, a tradition that lasted into the 1960s. Tandy-takes, first on the market in 1931, later became Kandy Kakes, the most popular cakes in the company's history, with nearly half a million baked and packaged each day.

In the 1970s and 80s, Tastykake sought to respond to the changing demographics and aging population of the region. A flurry of new product development added muffins, chocolate-covered pretzels, and pastries.

Despite being a predominantly regional product, the company obtained ingredients from around the world, including sugarcane and cocoa from Africa's Ivory Coast, vanilla from Madagascar, cinnamon from Indonesia, nutmeg from the East and West Indies, and banana puree from Ecuador. Other ingredients frequently employed are high fructose corn syrup and hydrogenated vegetable oil.

== Production facilities ==
Tasty Baking owned and operated a major production facility in the Allegheny West neighborhood of Philadelphia, between Allegheny Station and East Falls Station along the SEPTA Manayunk/Norristown Line. A second, smaller facility is located in Oxford, in Chester County, which historically made honey buns, doughnuts and cakes.

In May 2007, Tasty Baking announced it would move its headquarters and main bakery to the Philadelphia Naval Business Center in South Philadelphia. The new bakery is located on South 26th Street, with the headquarters on Crescent Drive. The move was completed in May 2010.

== Financials ==
The Tasty Baking Company went public on the NYSE in 1961 under the ticker symbol TBC. On October 21, 2005, the company transitioned to the NASDAQ National Market and changed their ticker symbol to TSTY. The company's stock was removed from trading at the close of business on May 24, 2011, upon completion of its acquisition by Flowers Foods, and its ticker symbol retired.

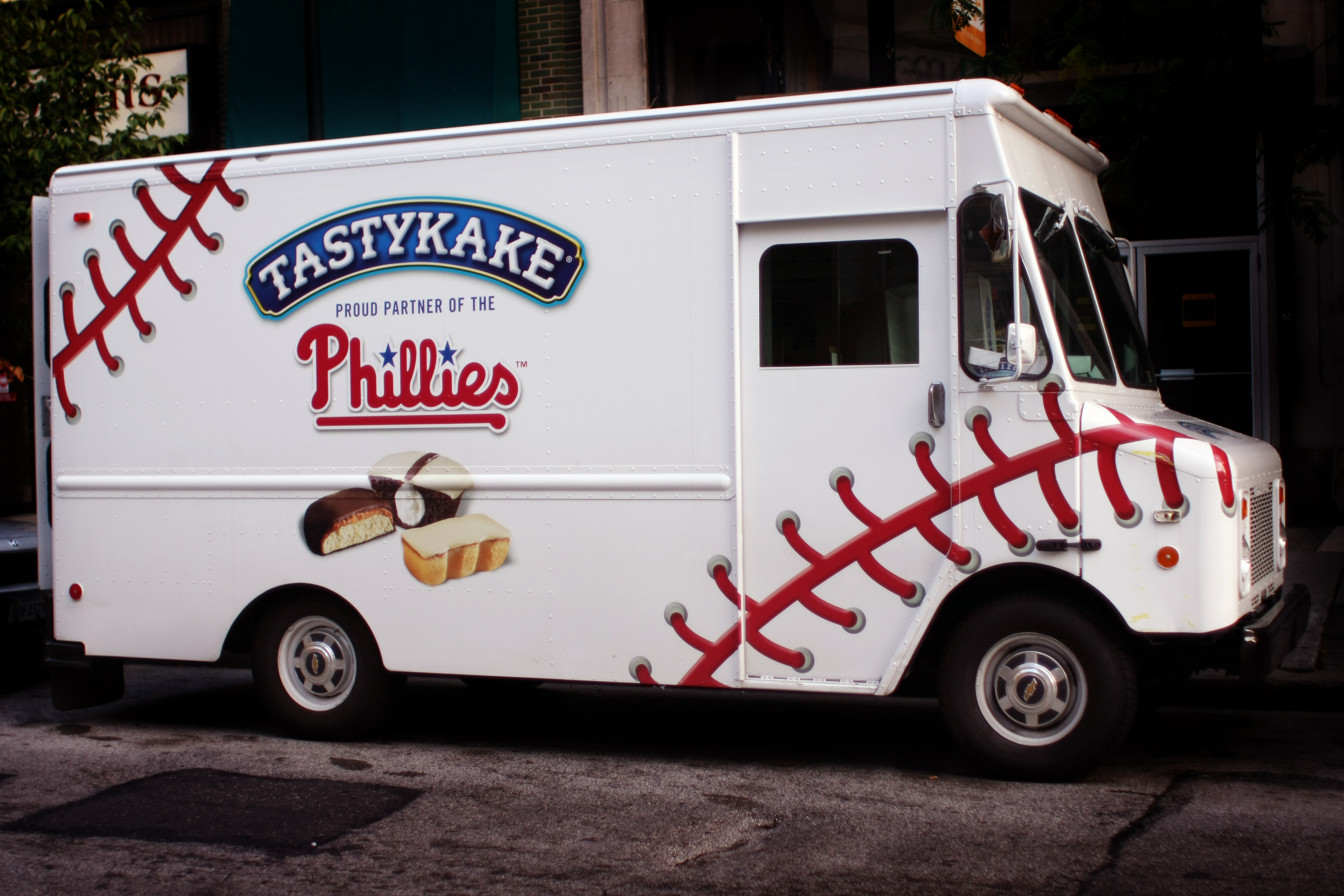
A Tastykake delivery van on Chestnut Street.

The price of Tastykake stock collapsed in early 2011, falling from a closing price of $6.43 on January 4, closing at $4.05 the next day. This decline, of about one-third the share price, was accompanied by a spike in trading (from about 5,000 shares on January 4, to almost 1,000,000 the next day). This move came after a 7.4% drop in company sales during the preceding quarter of 2010. The next week, speculation in financial circles indicated Tastykake had failed to realize the projected savings of moving to the new factory.

On April 11, 2011, media reports indicated Tastykake's leadership agreed to sell the company to Flowers Foods, of Thomasville, Georgia, for $34 million in cash, or about $4 per share. (Tastykake stock closed at $1.61 per share at the end of the previous trading day.) The sale to Flowers Foods was good news to Pennsylvania taxpayers, because Tastykake borrowed approximately $80 million to fund its new location in South Philadelphia, about half of which was from state lending programs.
