= Künzli =

Künzli may refer to:

- Anton Künzli (1771-1852), Swiss mayor of Winterthour
- Arnold Künzli (1832-1908), Swiss politician
- Carl Künzli-Tobler (1862-1925), Swiss publisher
- Fritz Künzli (1946-2019), Swiss footballer
- Hardy Künzli, Swiss slalom canoeist
- Otto Künzli (born 1948), Swiss art professor
- Raymond Künzli (born 1984), Swiss road racing cyclist

== See also ==
- Künzle
