= Künzler =

Künzler or Kuenzler is a Swiss surname. Notable people with the surname include:

- Albert Künzler (1911–1982), Swiss ice hockey player
- Alexander Künzler (born 1962), German boxer
- Jakob Künzler (1871–1949), Swiss witness of the Armenian Genocide
- Laura Künzler (born 1996), Swiss volleyball player
- Luis Manuel Enrique Téllez Kuenzler (born 1958), Mexican economist
- Mathis Künzler (born 1978), Swiss actor

== See also ==
- Kunze
- Kunzler (disambiguation)
