= Küntzel =

Küntzel or Kuentzel may refer to:

- Marco Küntzel, German soccer player
- Matthias Küntzel, German political scientist
- Karl-Friedrich Künzel, a German Schnellboot commander in World War II
- Tobias Künzel, a German Pop artist and composer
- Claudia Nystad (née Künzel), a German cross country skier
- Erich Kunzel, American orchestra conductor
- Brandy Kuentzel, American corporate attorney and businesswoman
- Sven Küntzel (born 1973), German politician
