= Allegheny station (SEPTA Regional Rail) =

Railway station in Pennsylvania, US

Allegheny
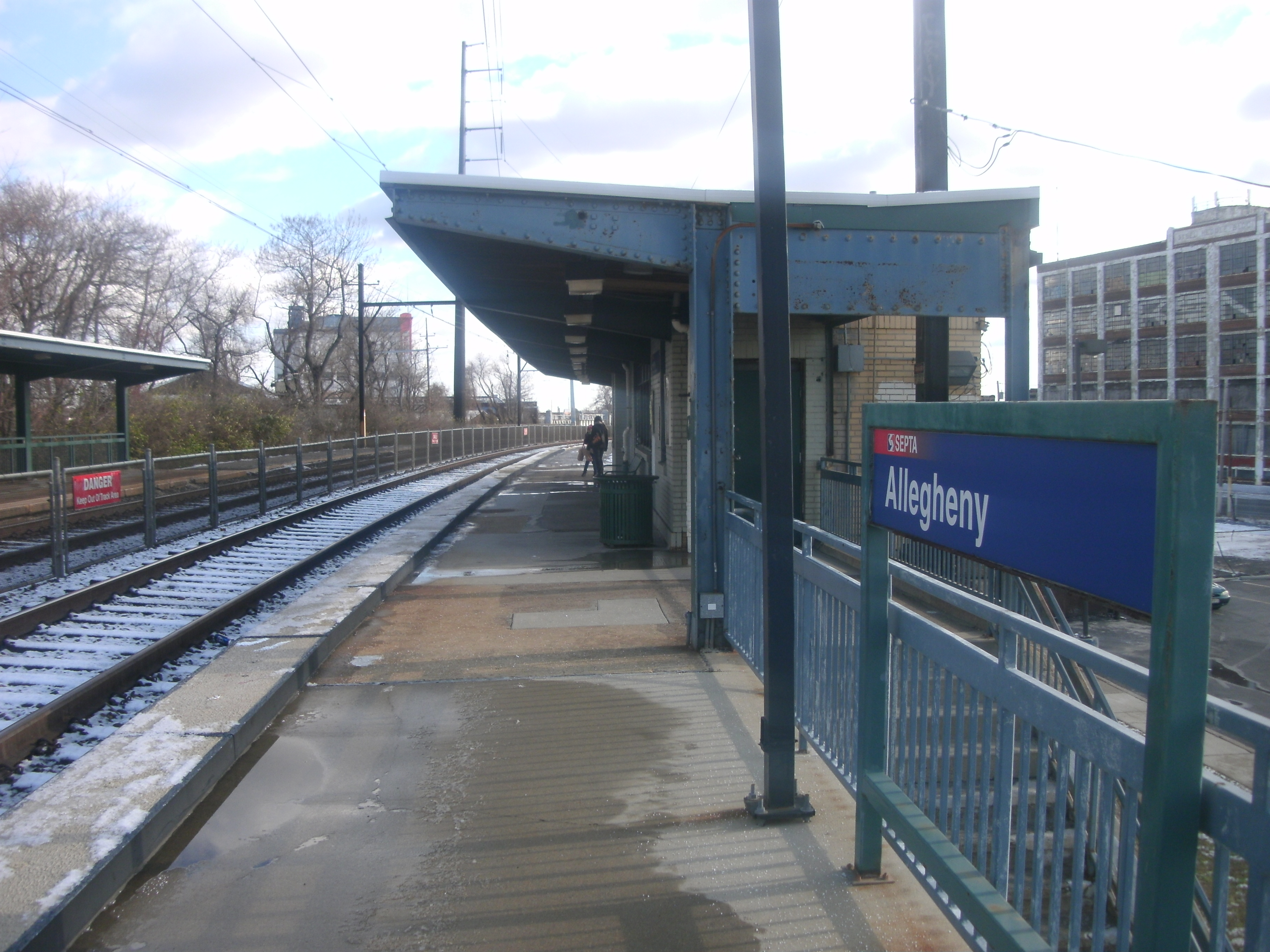
- Allegheny station in December 2012.

General information
- Location: 22nd Street and Allegheny Avenue; Swampoodle, Philadelphia, Pennsylvania
- Coordinates: 40.0037°N 75.1650°W
- Owner: SEPTA
- Line: Norristown Branch
- Platforms: 2 side platforms
- Tracks: 2
- Connections: SEPTA City Bus: 33, 60

Construction
- Accessible: No

Other information
- Fare zone: 1

History
- Opened: 1938
- Electrified: February 5, 1933
- Former names: 22nd Street

Services
Preceding station	SEPTA	Following station
East Falls toward Norristown–Elm Street	Manayunk/Norristown Line	North Broad toward Penn Medicine Station
Former services
Preceding station	Reading Railroad	Following station
East Falls toward Pottsville	Main Line	North Broad Street toward Philadelphia
East Falls toward Elm Street	Norristown Branch	North Broad Street toward Philadelphia
Location

Allegheny station is a SEPTA Regional Rail station located along the Manayunk/Norristown Line located at 22nd Street and Allegheny Avenue in the Swampoodle neighborhood of North Philadelphia. It has also been known in Reading and early SEPTA timetables as 22nd Street or Twenty-Second Street, a name also shared by a former Pennsylvania Railroad station on the Trenton and Chestnut Hill lines. Allegheny station is the first station along SEPTA's Manayunk/Norristown Line not to be shared with any other line. In FY 2013, Allegheny station had a weekday average of 76 boardings and 102 alightings.
