= East Falls station =

Railway station in East Falls, Pennsylvania

East Falls
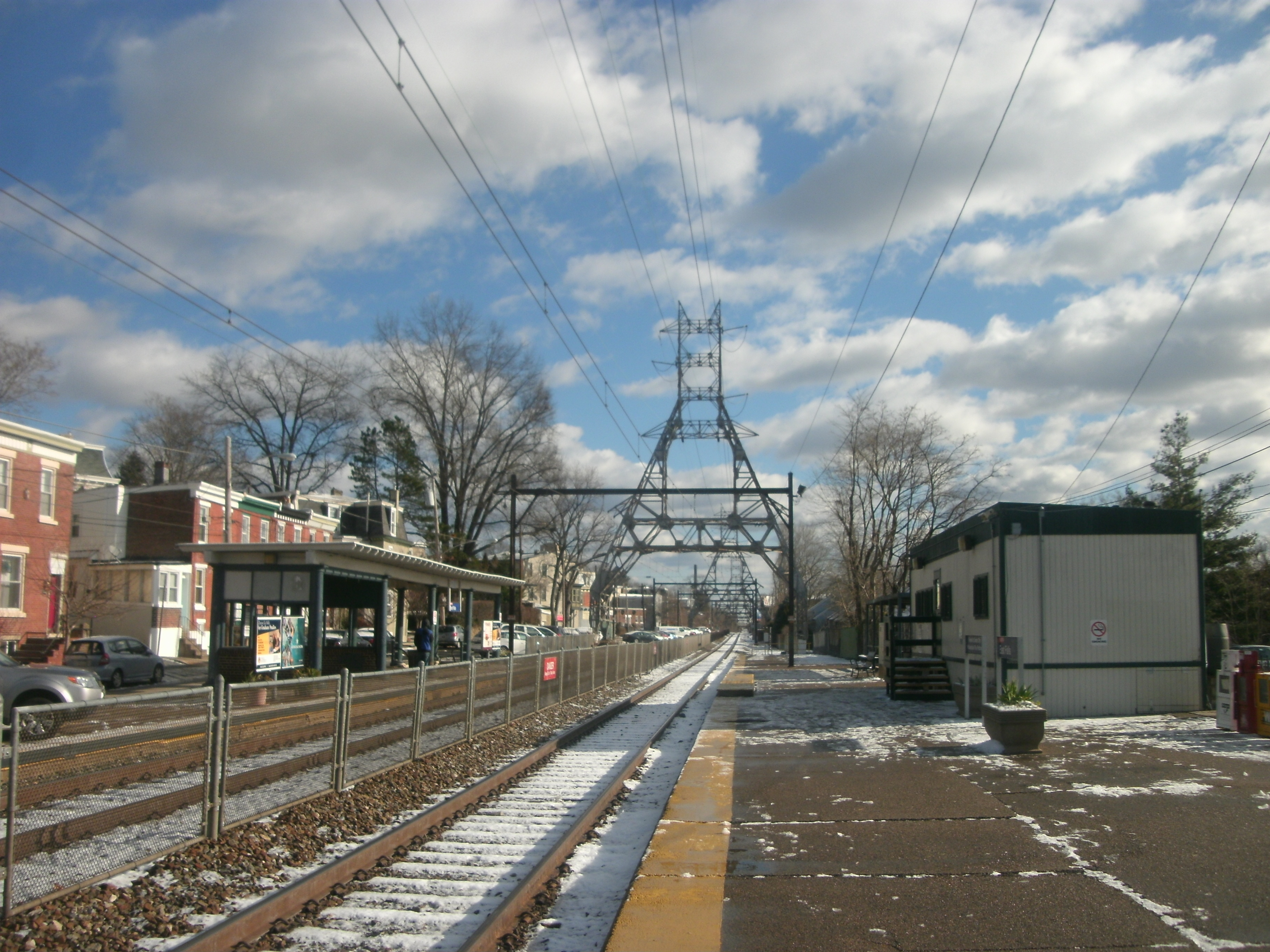
- East Falls station in December 2012.

General information
- Location: 3600 Midvale Avenue; East Falls, Pennsylvania 19129
- Coordinates: 40.0114°N 75.1920°W
- Owner: SEPTA
- Line: Norristown Branch
- Platforms: 2 side platforms
- Tracks: 2
- Connections: SEPTA City Bus: K

Construction
- Accessible: No

Other information
- Fare zone: 1

History
- Opened: 1856
- Rebuilt: November 18, 1912
- Electrified: February 5, 1933

Passengers
- 2017: 835 boardings 752 alightings (weekday average)
- Rank: 21 of 146

Services
Preceding station	SEPTA	Following station
Wissahickon toward Norristown–Elm Street	Manayunk/Norristown Line	Allegheny toward Penn Medicine Station
Former services
Preceding station	Reading Railroad	Following station
Wissahickon toward Pottsville	Main Line	22nd Street toward Philadelphia
Wissahickon toward Elm Street	Norristown Branch	22nd Street toward Philadelphia
Location

East Falls station is a station located along the Manayunk/Norristown Line in the East Falls section of Lower Northwest Philadelphia, Pennsylvania. It is located at Midvale Avenue & Cresson Street and includes a 51 space parking lot. In FY 2017, East Falls station had a weekday average of 835 boardings and 752 alightings.

Though little more than a pair of platforms with open shelters and a trailer, it serves as a replacement for a former Reading Railroad station which was opened in 1912, and burnt down approximately in 1982. It contains a staircase leading to Cresson Street and the station on the north side of the viaduct over Midvale Avenue, and a pedestrian crosswalk with a traffic signal exclusively for that crosswalk on the south side.
