= Göncz =

Göncz is a Hungarian surname. Notable people with the surname include:

- Árpád Göncz (1922–2015), Hungarian liberal politician, President of Hungary
- Kinga Göncz (born 1947), Hungarian academic, Minister of Foreign Affairs of Hungary
- László Göncz (born 1960), Hungarian historian and politician
- Renáta Göncz (born 1991), Hungarian opera singer
- Zoltán Göncz (born 1958), Hungarian composer
