= Kunzel =

Kunzel is a surname. Notable people with the surname include:

- Erich Kunzel (1935–2009), American orchestra conductor
- Fred Kunzel (1901–1969), United States federal judge
- Ingrid Künzel (born 1938), German swimmer
- Michael Künzel (born 1973), German speed skater
- Tobias Künzel (born 1964), German pop artist and composer
