= Kunzler & Company =

American food manufacturer and processor

Kunzler Brand
- Company type: Public
- Industry: Food processing
- Founded: 1901
- Headquarters: Hatfield, PA; Lancaster, PA. (until December 7, 2024)
- Products: bologna, steaks, scrapple, hot dogs, sausage
- Parent: Clemens Food Group
- Website: www.kunzler.com

Kunzler & Company, Inc. (often referred to as Kunzler) is an American food manufacturer and processor owned and operated by Clemens Food Group.

The company was founded in 1901 by a German butcher named Christian Kunzler who moved to Lancaster, Pennsylvania. Headquarters was based in the city of Lancaster and used to produce such products as natural hardwood smoked bacon, ham, bologna smoked with native Pennsylvania hardwoods, beef and grill franks, Pennsylvania Dutch scrapple, and Midwestern, hand-trimmed steak.

Kunzler & Company, Inc. produces the official hot dog of the Lancaster Barnstormers baseball team.

Kunzler & Company was in its 4th generation of family operating the business prior the buyout.

In May 2024, Kunzler was purchased by Clemens Food Group, the 5th largest pork processor in the United States. Two months later, the company announced it will sell the Lancaster plant. 60 jobs were cut.

On October 4, 2024, Clemens Food Group announced that after 123 years in the Lancaster area, the Kunzler plant on 652 Manor Street will be closing on December 7, 2024. 193 employees will lose their jobs. The decision will also make John F. Martin & Sons the last independent meat packing company remaining in the area.
