= List of SEPTA Regional Rail stations =

Commuter train stops in the Delaware Valley

A map of the SEPTA Regional Rail system, with local and regional transit connections.

SEPTA Regional Rail is the commuter rail system serving Philadelphia, Pennsylvania and the greater Philadelphia metropolitan area. The system is operated by the Southeastern Pennsylvania Transportation Authority (SEPTA) and serves five counties in Pennsylvania—Bucks, Delaware, Montgomery, Chester, and Philadelphia—in addition to Mercer County, New Jersey and New Castle County, Delaware. The system covers a total route length of 280 miles (450 km), with 13 service lines and 155 stations. The stations' distances from Center City Philadelphia can be determined by their fare zones. Stations in Center City are part of the CC zone, with outlying zones numbered 1 through 4, plus a zone for stations in New Jersey (NJ zone). In the 2023 fiscal year, SEPTA Regional Rail had an average weekday ridership of 58,713.

The current Regional Rail system was originally two separate commuter rail networks, owned and operated by the Pennsylvania Railroad (PRR) and the Reading Company, respectively. PRR services to Philadelphia terminated at Broad Street Station (opened in 1881; replaced by Suburban Station in 1930), and Reading services terminated at the Reading Terminal (opened in 1893). After SEPTA was formed in 1964, the transport agency began overseeing commuter rail services, however, the railroad companies continued operating their own trains. After operations were taken over by Conrail in 1976, SEPTA began acquiring ownership of the railroads through 1979. The SEPTA Regional Rail Division was created on January 1, 1983, giving SEPTA complete operational control of its railroads.

To merge the two railroad networks, the Center City Commuter Connection opened in 1984, which included a tunnel between Suburban Station and the new Market East Station (later renamed Jefferson Station), which replaced the Reading Terminal. The tunnel allowed for trains to traveling into Center City to continue as through services into adjacent suburbs. Rail services were combined into seven routes, designated as R1 through R8. (Note: The "R4" designation was reserved for future use, but was never implemented.) The "R" designations were later dropped in 2010, and the network was reconfigured with 13 routes renamed for their outbound terminal stations.

== Lines ==
SEPTA Regional Rail lines
| Line | Weekday ridership (FY 2023) | Route length | Inbound terminus (Note: Most trains continue past their inbound terminus towards an outbound station along a different line (with the exception of Cynwyd Line trains).) | Outbound terminus |
|---|---|---|---|---|
| Airport Line | 5,268 | 12.10 mi (19.47 km) | Temple University | Airport Terminals E & F |
| Chestnut Hill East Line | 2,318 | 12.20 mi (19.63 km) | 30th Street Station | Chestnut Hill East |
| Chestnut Hill West Line | 2,768 | 14.59 mi (23.48 km) | Temple University | Chestnut Hill West |
| Cynwyd Line | 112 | 6.93 mi (11.15 km) | Suburban Station | Cynwyd |
| Fox Chase Line | 2,425 | 12.69 mi (20.42 km) | 30th Street Station | Fox Chase |
| Lansdale/Doylestown Line | 7,674 | 35.81 mi (57.63 km) | 30th Street Station | Doylestown |
| Manayunk/Norristown Line | 4,724 | 20.48 mi (32.96 km) | Penn Medicine Station | Elm Street |
| Media/Wawa Line | 3,548 | 20.77 mi (33.43 km) | Temple University | Wawa Station |
| Paoli/Thorndale Line | 7,425 | 37.92 mi (61.03 km) | Temple University | Thorndale |
| Trenton Line | 7,316 | 35.95 mi (57.86 km) | Temple University | Trenton Transit Center |
| Warminster Line | 5,227 | 22.37 mi (36.00 km) | Penn Medicine Station | Warminster |
| West Trenton Line | 5,736 | 34.79 mi (55.99 km) | Penn Medicine Station | West Trenton |
| Wilmington/Newark Line | 4,172 | 41.37 mi (66.58 km) | Temple University | Newark |

== Stations ==
All stations are located in Pennsylvania, unless otherwise noted. Stations located within the City of Philadelphia are additionally distinguished by neighborhood or area as noted on the official SEPTA map. Accessible stations are noted with the icon.

SEPTA Regional Rail stations
| Station | Line | Rail connections | Zone | Location | Ridership |
|---|---|---|---|---|---|
| 9th Street | Lansdale/Doylestown Line | —N/a | 4 | Lansdale | |
| 30th Street Station (Note: Officially William H. Gray III 30th Street Station) | Airport Line (SEPTA) Chestnut Hill East Line Chestnut Hill West Line Cynwyd Line Fox Chase Line Lansdale/Doylestown Line Manayunk/Norristown Line Media/Wawa Line Paoli/Thorndale Line Trenton Line Warminster Line West Trenton Line Wilmington/Newark Line | Amtrak: Keystone Corridor lines, Northeast Corridor lines; NJ Transit: ■ Atlantic City Line; SEPTA Metro: (at Drexel Station at 30th Street) | CC | Philadelphia (University City) | 9,920 |
| 49th Street | Media/Wawa Line | SEPTA Metro: (at 49th–Chester) | 1 | Philadelphia (Kingessing) | 42 |
| Airport Terminal A | Airport Line (SEPTA) | —N/a | 4 | Philadelphia (Airport) | 400 |
| Airport Terminal B | Airport Line (SEPTA) | —N/a | 4 | Philadelphia (Airport) | 425 |
| Airport Terminals C & D | Airport Line (SEPTA) | —N/a | 4 | Philadelphia (Airport) | 418 |
| Airport Terminals E & F | Airport Line (SEPTA) | —N/a | 4 | Philadelphia (Airport) | 388 |
| Allegheny | Manayunk/Norristown Line | —N/a | 1 | Philadelphia (Swampoodle) | |
| Ambler | Lansdale/Doylestown Line | —N/a | 3 | Ambler | 1,138 |
| Angora | Media/Wawa Line | SEPTA Metro: (at 58th–Baltimore) | 1 | Philadelphia (Angora) | 26 |
| Ardmore | Paoli/Thorndale Line | Amtrak: Keystone Service | 2 | Ardmore | 821 |
| Ardsley | Warminster Line | —N/a | 3 | Ardsley | 146 |
| Bala | Cynwyd Line | —N/a | 2 | Bala Cynwyd | |
| Berwyn | Paoli/Thorndale Line | —N/a | 3 | Berwyn | 363 |
| Bethayres | West Trenton Line | —N/a | 3 | Bethayres | 636 |
| Bridesburg | Trenton Line | —N/a | 2 | Philadelphia (Bridesburg) | 164 |
| Bristol | Trenton Line | —N/a | 4 | Bristol | 375 |
| Bryn Mawr | Paoli/Thorndale Line | —N/a | 3 | Bryn Mawr | 937 |
| Carpenter | Chestnut Hill West Line | —N/a | 2 | Philadelphia (West Mount Airy) | 342 |
| Chalfont | Lansdale/Doylestown Line | —N/a | 4 | Chalfont | 108 |
| Chelten Avenue | Chestnut Hill West Line | —N/a | 2 | Philadelphia (Germantown) | 359 |
| Cheltenham | Fox Chase Line | —N/a | 2 | Cheltenham | 293 |
| Chester Transit Center | Wilmington/Newark Line | —N/a | 3 | Chester | 222 |
| Chestnut Hill East | Chestnut Hill East Line | —N/a | 2 | Philadelphia (Chestnut Hill) | 224 |
| Chestnut Hill West | Chestnut Hill West Line | —N/a | 2 | Philadelphia (Chestnut Hill) | 308 |
| Churchmans Crossing | Wilmington/Newark Line | —N/a | 4 | Christiana, Delaware | 321 |
| Claymont | Wilmington/Newark Line | —N/a | 4 | Claymont, Delaware | 534 |
| Clifton–Aldan | Media/Wawa Line | SEPTA Metro: | 2 | Aldan/Clifton Heights | 269 |
| Colmar | Lansdale/Doylestown Line | —N/a | 4 | Colmar | 494 |
| Conshohocken | Manayunk/Norristown Line | —N/a | 3 | Conshohocken | 771 |
| Cornwells Heights | Trenton Line | Amtrak: Keystone Service | 3 | Cornwells Heights | 1,505 |
| Crestmont | Warminster Line | —N/a | 3 | Crestmont | 66 |
| Croydon | Trenton Line | —N/a | 3 | Croydon | 486 |
| Crum Lynne | Wilmington/Newark Line | —N/a | 3 | Crum Lynne | 62 |
| Curtis Park | Wilmington/Newark Line | —N/a | 2 | Sharon Hill | 68 |
| Cynwyd | Cynwyd Line | —N/a | 2 | Bala Cynwyd | |
| Darby | Wilmington/Newark Line | —N/a | 2 | Darby | |
| Daylesford | Paoli/Thorndale Line | —N/a | 3 | Daylesford | 258 |
| Delaware Valley University | Lansdale/Doylestown Line | —N/a | 4 | Doylestown | 77 |
| Devon | Paoli/Thorndale Line | —N/a | 3 | Devon | 455 |
| Downingtown | Paoli/Thorndale Line | Amtrak: Keystone Service | 4 | Downingtown | 291 |
| Doylestown | Lansdale/Doylestown Line | —N/a | 4 | Doylestown | 317 |
| East Falls | Manayunk/Norristown Line | —N/a | 1 | Philadelphia (East Falls) | 835 |
| Eastwick | Airport Line (SEPTA) | —N/a | 1 | Philadelphia (Eastwick) | 354 |
| Eddington | Trenton Line | —N/a | 3 | Eddington | 53 |
| Eddystone | Wilmington/Newark Line | —N/a | 3 | Eddystone | 43 |
| Elkins Park | Warminster Line West Trenton Line | —N/a | 2 | Elkins Park | 302 |
| Elm Street | Manayunk/Norristown Line | —N/a | 3 | Norristown | 300 |
| Elwyn | Media/Wawa Line | —N/a | 3 | Elwyn | 425 |
| Exton | Paoli/Thorndale Line | Amtrak: Keystone Corridor lines | 4 | Exton | 627 |
| Fern Rock Transit Center | Lansdale/Doylestown Line Warminster Line West Trenton Line | SEPTA Metro: | 1 | Philadelphia (Fern Rock) | 650 |
| Fernwood–Yeadon | Media/Wawa Line | —N/a | 2 | Upper Darby/Yeadon | 72 |
| Folcroft | Wilmington/Newark Line | —N/a | 2 | Folcroft | 167 |
| Forest Hills | West Trenton Line | —N/a | 3 | Philadelphia (Somerton) | 367 |
| Fort Washington | Lansdale/Doylestown Line | —N/a | 3 | Fort Washington | 1,125 |
| Fortuna | Lansdale/Doylestown Line | —N/a | 4 | Hatfield | |
| Fox Chase | Fox Chase Line | —N/a | 2 | Philadelphia (Fox Chase) | 1,446 |
| Germantown | Chestnut Hill East Line | —N/a | 1 | Philadelphia (Germantown) | 102 |
| Gladstone | Media/Wawa Line | —N/a | 2 | Lansdowne | 195 |
| Glenolden | Wilmington/Newark Line | —N/a | 2 | Glenolden | 170 |
| Glenside | Lansdale/Doylestown Line Warminster Line | —N/a | 3 | Glenside | 1,213 |
| Gravers | Chestnut Hill East Line | —N/a | 2 | Philadelphia (Chestnut Hill) | |
| Gwynedd Valley | Lansdale/Doylestown Line | —N/a | 3 | Gwynedd Valley | 214 |
| Hatboro | Warminster Line | —N/a | 3 | Hatboro | 500 |
| Haverford | Paoli/Thorndale Line | —N/a | 2 | Haverford | 404 |
| Highland | Chestnut Hill West Line | —N/a | 2 | Philadelphia (Chestnut Hill) | 70 |
| Highland Avenue | Wilmington/Newark Line | —N/a | 3 | Chester | 99 |
| Holmesburg Junction | Trenton Line | —N/a | 2 | Philadelphia (Holmesburg) | 471 |
| Ivy Ridge | Manayunk/Norristown Line | —N/a | 2 | Philadelphia (Roxborough) | 703 |
| Jefferson Station | Airport Line (SEPTA) Chestnut Hill East Line Chestnut Hill West Line Fox Chase Line Lansdale/Doylestown Line Manayunk/Norristown Line Media/Wawa Line Paoli/Thorndale Line Trenton Line Warminster Line West Trenton Line Wilmington/Newark Line | SEPTA Metro: (at 8th–Market); SEPTA Metro: (at 11th Street); DRPA: PATCO (at 8th & Market) | CC | Philadelphia (Market East) | 12,122 |
| Jenkintown–Wyncote | Lansdale/Doylestown Line Warminster Line West Trenton Line | —N/a | 3 | Jenkintown | 1,246 |
| Langhorne | West Trenton Line | —N/a | 4 | Langhorne Manor | 404 |
| Lansdale | Lansdale/Doylestown Line | —N/a | 4 | Lansdale | 1,424 |
| Lansdowne | Media/Wawa Line | —N/a | 2 | Lansdowne | 321 |
| Lawndale | Fox Chase Line | —N/a | 2 | Philadelphia (Lawndale) | 168 |
| Levittown | Trenton Line | —N/a | 4 | Tullytown | 548 |
| Link Belt | Lansdale/Doylestown Line | —N/a | 4 | Chalfont | 23 |
| Main Street | Manayunk/Norristown Line | —N/a | 3 | Norristown | 185 |
| Malvern | Paoli/Thorndale Line | —N/a | 4 | Malvern | 811 |
| Manayunk | Manayunk/Norristown Line | —N/a | 2 | Philadelphia (Manayunk) | 723 |
| Marcus Hook | Wilmington/Newark Line | —N/a | 3 | Marcus Hook | 545 |
| Meadowbrook | West Trenton Line | —N/a | 3 | Meadowbrook | 122 |
| Media | Media/Wawa Line | SEPTA Metro: (at Orange Street/Media) | 3 | Upper Providence Township | 512 |
| Melrose Park | Warminster Line West Trenton Line | —N/a | 2 | Melrose Park | 507 |
| Merion | Paoli/Thorndale Line | —N/a | 2 | Merion Station | |
| Miquon | Manayunk/Norristown Line | —N/a | 2 | Miquon | 444 |
| Morton | Media/Wawa Line | —N/a | 2 | Morton | 612 |
| Mount Airy | Chestnut Hill East Line | —N/a | 2 | Philadelphia (East Mount Airy) | 208 |
| Moylan–Rose Valley | Media/Wawa Line | —N/a | 3 | Moylan | 221 |
| Narberth | Paoli/Thorndale Line | —N/a | 2 | Narberth | 714 |
| Neshaminy Falls | West Trenton Line | —N/a | 3 | Feasterville-Trevose | 319 |
| New Britain | Lansdale/Doylestown Line | —N/a | 4 | New Britain | 50 |
| Newark | Wilmington/Newark Line | Amtrak: Northeast Regional | 4 | Newark, Delaware | 318 |
| Noble | West Trenton Line | —N/a | 3 | Noble | 197 |
| Norristown Transit Center | Manayunk/Norristown Line | SEPTA Metro: | 3 | Norristown | 856 |
| North Broad | Lansdale/Doylestown Line Manayunk/Norristown Line | SEPTA Metro: (at North Philadelphia) | 1 | Philadelphia (Glenwood) | 142 |
| North Hills | Lansdale/Doylestown Line | —N/a | 3 | North Hills | 208 |
| North Philadelphia | Chestnut Hill West Line Trenton Line | Amtrak: Keystone Service; SEPTA Metro: (at North Philadelphia) | 1 | Philadelphia (Glenwood) | 195 |
| North Wales | Lansdale/Doylestown Line | —N/a | 4 | North Wales | 974 |
| Norwood | Wilmington/Newark Line | —N/a | 2 | Norwood | 267 |
| Olney | Fox Chase Line | —N/a | 1 | Philadelphia (Olney) | 170 |
| Oreland | Lansdale/Doylestown Line | —N/a | 3 | Oreland | 243 |
| Overbrook | Paoli/Thorndale Line | SEPTA Metro: (at 63rd–Malvern) | 1 | Philadelphia (Overbrook) | 774 |
| Paoli | Paoli/Thorndale Line | Amtrak: Keystone Corridor lines | 4 | Paoli | 1,114 |
| Penllyn | Lansdale/Doylestown Line | —N/a | 3 | Penllyn | 200 |
| Penn Medicine Station | Airport Line (SEPTA) Manayunk/Norristown Line Media/Wawa Line Warminster Line West Trenton Line Wilmington/Newark Line | —N/a | CC | Philadelphia (University City) | 2,605 |
| Pennbrook | Lansdale/Doylestown Line | —N/a | 4 | Lansdale | 615 |
| Philmont | West Trenton Line | —N/a | 3 | Huntingdon Valley | 595 |
| Primos | Media/Wawa Line | —N/a | 2 | Aldan/Upper Darby | 652 |
| Prospect Park | Wilmington/Newark Line | —N/a | 2 | Prospect Park | 182 |
| Queen Lane | Chestnut Hill West Line | —N/a | 1 | Philadelphia (Germantown) | 427 |
| Radnor | Paoli/Thorndale Line | SEPTA Metro: (at Radnor South) | 3 | Radnor | 586 |
| Richard Allen Lane | Chestnut Hill West Line | —N/a | 2 | Philadelphia (West Mount Airy) | |
| Ridley Park | Wilmington/Newark Line | —N/a | 3 | Ridley Park | 217 |
| Rosemont | Paoli/Thorndale Line | —N/a | 3 | Rosemont | 323 |
| Roslyn | Warminster Line | —N/a | 3 | Roslyn | 285 |
| Rydal | West Trenton Line | —N/a | 3 | Rydal | 121 |
| Ryers | Fox Chase Line | —N/a | 2 | Philadelphia (Burholme) | 357 |
| Secane | Media/Wawa Line | —N/a | 2 | Secane | 564 |
| Sedgwick | Chestnut Hill East Line | —N/a | 2 | Philadelphia (East Mount Airy) | 258 |
| Sharon Hill | Wilmington/Newark Line | —N/a | 2 | Sharon Hill | 98 |
| Somerton | West Trenton Line | —N/a | 3 | Philadelphia (Somerton) | 724 |
| Spring Mill | Manayunk/Norristown Line | —N/a | 3 | Spring Mill | 509 |
| St. Davids | Paoli/Thorndale Line | —N/a | 3 | St. Davids | 242 |
| St. Martins | Chestnut Hill West Line | —N/a | 2 | Philadelphia (Chestnut Hill) | 201 |
| Stenton | Chestnut Hill East Line | —N/a | 2 | Philadelphia (East Mount Airy) | 382 |
| Strafford | Paoli/Thorndale Line | —N/a | 3 | Strafford | 780 |
| Suburban Station | Airport Line (SEPTA) Chestnut Hill East Line Chestnut Hill West Line Cynwyd Line Fox Chase Line Lansdale/Doylestown Line Manayunk/Norristown Line Media/Wawa Line Paoli/Thorndale Line Trenton Line Warminster Line West Trenton Line Wilmington/Newark Line | SEPTA Metro: (at 15th Street/City Hall) | CC | Philadelphia (Logan Square) | 25,062 |
| Swarthmore | Media/Wawa Line | —N/a | 3 | Swarthmore | 790 |
| Tacony | Trenton Line | —N/a | 2 | Philadelphia (Tacony) | 192 |
| Temple University | Airport Line (SEPTA) Chestnut Hill East Line Chestnut Hill West Line Fox Chase Line Lansdale/Doylestown Line Manayunk/Norristown Line Media/Wawa Line Paoli/Thorndale Line Trenton Line Warminster Line West Trenton Line Wilmington/Newark Line | —N/a | CC | Philadelphia (Temple University) | 3,191 |
| Thorndale | Paoli/Thorndale Line | —N/a | 4 | Thorndale | 427 |
| Torresdale | Trenton Line | —N/a | 3 | Philadelphia (Torresdale) | 1,227 |
| Trenton Transit Center | Trenton Line | Amtrak: Northeast Corridor lines (except Acela); NJ Transit: ■ Northeast Corridor Line ■ River Line | NJ | Trenton, New Jersey | 1,241 |
| Trevose | West Trenton Line | —N/a | 3 | Trevose | 412 |
| Tulpehocken | Chestnut Hill West Line | —N/a | 1 | Philadelphia (Germantown) | 194 |
| Upsal | Chestnut Hill West Line | —N/a | 2 | Philadelphia (West Mount Airy) | 356 |
| Villanova | Paoli/Thorndale Line | —N/a | 3 | Villanova | 466 |
| Wallingford | Media/Wawa Line | —N/a | 3 | Wallingford | 280 |
| Warminster | Warminster Line | —N/a | 3 | Warminster Heights | 1,058 |
| Washington Lane | Chestnut Hill East Line | —N/a | 2 | Philadelphia (Germantown) | 162 |
| Wawa Station | Media/Wawa Line | —N/a | 3 | Wawa | |
| Wayne | Paoli/Thorndale Line | —N/a | 3 | Wayne | 526 |
| Wayne Junction | Chestnut Hill East Line Fox Chase Line Lansdale/Doylestown Line Warminster Line West Trenton Line | —N/a | 1 | Philadelphia (Nicetown) | 375 |
| West Trenton | West Trenton Line | —N/a | NJ | West Trenton, New Jersey | |
| Whitford | Paoli/Thorndale Line | —N/a | 4 | Exton | 408 |
| Willow Grove | Warminster Line | —N/a | 3 | Willow Grove | 388 |
| Wilmington | Wilmington/Newark Line | Amtrak: Northeast Corridor lines | 4 | Wilmington, Delaware | 878 |
| Wissahickon | Manayunk/Norristown Line | —N/a | 1 | Philadelphia (Wissahickon) | 520 |
| Wister | Chestnut Hill East Line | —N/a | 1 | Philadelphia (Germantown) | 64 |
| Woodbourne | West Trenton Line | —N/a | 4 | Woodbourne | 592 |
| Wyndmoor | Chestnut Hill East Line | —N/a | 2 | Philadelphia (Chestnut Hill) | 109 |
| Wynnefield Avenue | Cynwyd Line | —N/a | 1 | Philadelphia (Wynnefield) | 58 |
| Wynnewood | Paoli/Thorndale Line | —N/a | 2 | Wynnewood | 765 |
| Yardley | West Trenton Line | —N/a | 4 | Yardley | 349 |
