= Wingohocking Creek =

Former creek in Philadelphia, Pennsylvania

Coordinates: 40°1′0″N 75°6′26″W

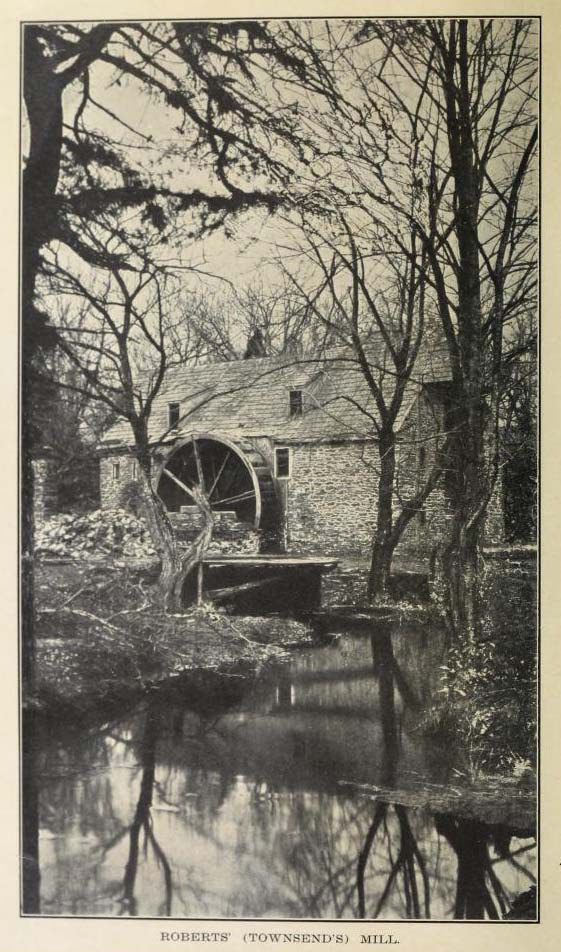
Roberts' Mill, circa 1870. Roberts' Mill (built 1680s, demolished 1873), was on Mill Creek, at Church Lane.

Wingohocking Creek was once a major tributary of another Philadelphia, Pennsylvania stream, Frankford Creek, which flows into the Delaware River. Frankford Creek was formed by the confluence of Wingohocking Creek and Tacony Creek (sections of which, in Montgomery County, Pennsylvania, are also called Tookany Creek). Since Wingohocking Creek is now obliterated, having been piped underground in the late 19th century, it can be confusing to look at a modern map, which shows Tacony Creek suddenly changing names "in the middle of the stream," so to speak, and becoming Frankford Creek. The point at which the name changes is near the present intersection of I and Ramona Streets, where the Wingohocking once joined the Tacony to form the Frankford Creek. What was once a major stream and the site of many mills and factories has been completely wiped off the map—all but the city's sewer maps, that is. The outlet of the Wingohocking Sewer is the largest in the Philadelphia sewer system, about 24 feet (7.3 m) high. It is visible from various points in the Juniata neighborhood and the adjoining golf course.

The word "Wingohocking" may have originated from the indigenous Lenni Lenape for "favorite land for planting" or, perhaps, "crooked water." By other accounts, the stream was named by James Logan in honor of Chief Wingohocking, with whom he traded names in traditional Native American fashion as a sign of mutual respect.

The stream now flows in a combined sewer (carrying both storm water and raw sewage) under Belfield Avenue and close to the route of Wingohocking Street in the Logan neighborhood of Philadelphia. It had two branches, the larger of which, the West Branch, reached as far as the Mount Airy neighborhood. In the 1860s, when municipal engineers drew up the preliminary drainage maps for Philadelphia's 129 square miles (330 km^{2}), the conversion of many of the city's smaller streams into sewers became an integral part of the plan. The Wingohocking was converted beginning in the 1880s, with the final section of 21 miles (34 km) of streams finally obliterated in 1928.

That mistakes were made in this process is evident in the city's Logan neighborhood, where more than 900 houses have been evacuated and demolished because of the threat of subsidence and collapse from weakened foundations caused by the inadequate fill material (fly ash) that was used when the stream was first covered. The city purchased most of the homes in this area (called the Logan Redevelopment Area) and demolished them, leaving only a ghostly, rectangular grid of streets as a reminder of the former urban landscape. The area is slated for commercial redevelopment.

The creek formerly ran upstream from its confluence with the Tacony Creek in the vicinity of I Street and Ramona Avenue, west along Ramona two blocks to Cayuga then along Cayuga past G Street, and then Whitaker Avenue, then roughly parallel to Macalester Street and Hunting Park Avenue, staying north of Hunting Park, following the southerly boundary of Greenmount Cemetery near Front Street and Hunting Park Avenue. Sewer manhole pylons are visible in the lowest ground in this area.

As described above, the Wingohocking Creek system was composed of two branches, which converged at a point located under Belfield Avenue west of modern-day Broad Street. The southerly branch, Wingohocking Creek proper, followed the path taken today by SEPTA's Chestnut Hill East rail line (built by the Philadelphia, Germantown & Norristown Railroad in 1833 and extended by the successor Philadelphia & Reading Railroad in the 1850s) between Sedgwick and Wister stations. The northerly branch, listed on maps as Mill Creek, began in Mt. Airy slightly north of Stenton Avenue and followed the path of Mansfield Avenue which was built on top of Mill Creek when it was arched over.

A small section of Wingohocking Creek has been uncovered, or daylighted, at Awbury Arboretum. This is the only portion of the Wingohocking currently visible above ground.

Although the creek is now extinct, its name lives on in Philadelphia's Wingohocking Street.

== See also ==
- List of rivers of Pennsylvania
