= Fishers station =

Railway station in Philadelphia, the United States of America

Fishers
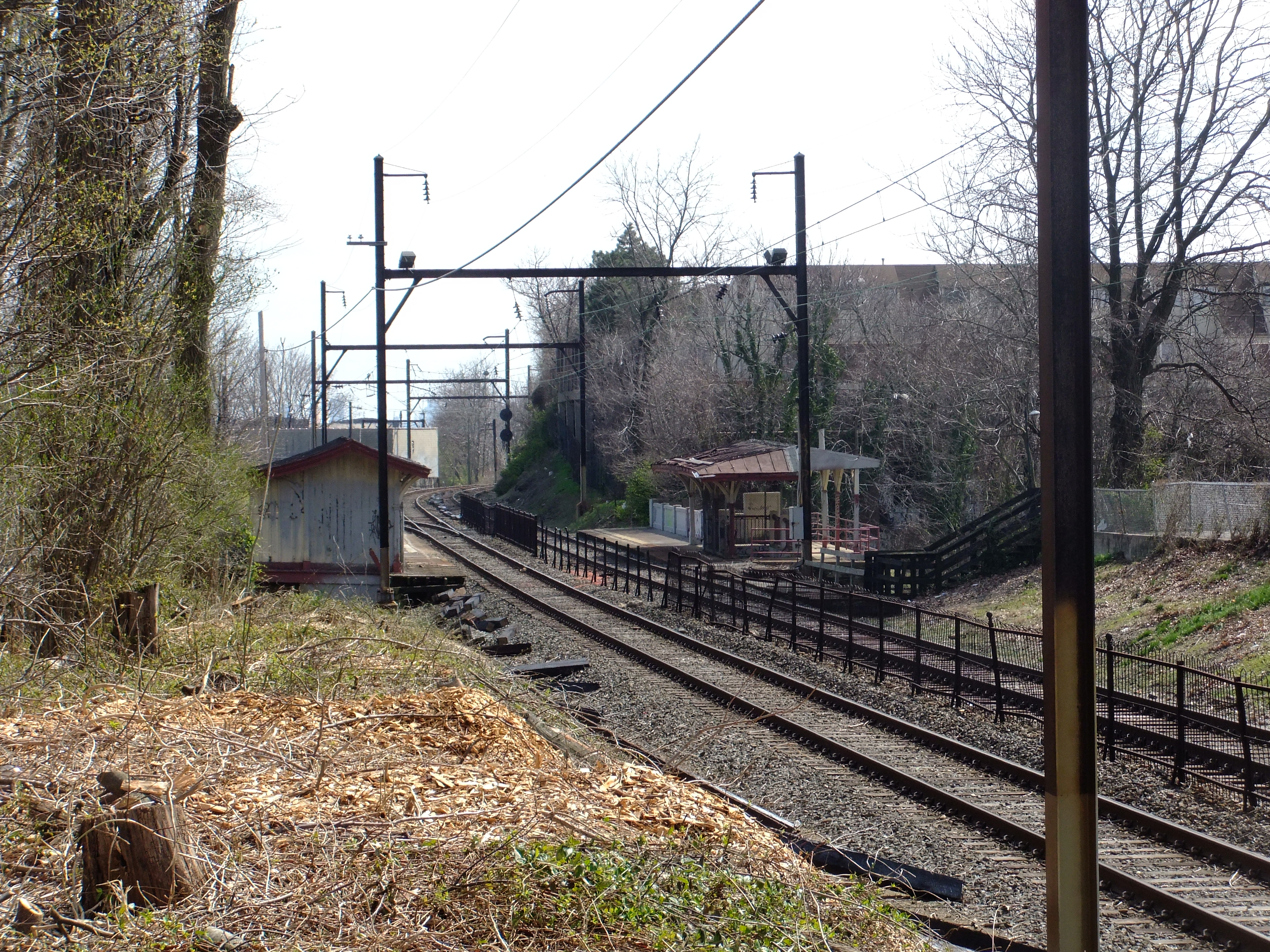
- Fishers station from the north prior to the demolition of the former outbound canopy.

General information
- Location: 335 East Logan Street, Philadelphia, Pennsylvania 19141
- Coordinates: 40.0310°N 75.1571°W
- Owner: SEPTA
- Line: Chestnut Hill East Branch
- Platforms: 2 side platform
- Tracks: 2

Construction
- Platform levels: 1
- Parking: No
- Accessible: No

Other information
- Fare zone: 1

History
- Closed: 1992
- Electrified: February 5, 1933

Former services
Preceding station	SEPTA	Following station
Wayne Junction toward 30th Street Station	Chestnut Hill East Line	Wister toward Chestnut Hill East
Preceding station	Reading Railroad	Following station
Wayne Junction toward Philadelphia	Chestnut Hill Branch	Wister toward Chestnut Hill
Location

Fishers station is an abandoned railroad station in Philadelphia, Pennsylvania. It is located at 335 East Logan Street. Built by the Reading Railroad, it later served SEPTA Regional Rail's R7 Chestnut Hill East Line. The station was closed in 1992 for the RailWorks project and not reopened due to low ridership. The station canopies in each direction stood after the station's closure. The outbound canopy was razed on July 1, 2022 to the dismay of locals, who felt that the demolition was done because it was a low-income African-American neighborhood.
