= Mount Airy station =

SEPTA train station in Mount Airy, Philadelphia, Pennsylvania, United States

Mt. Airy
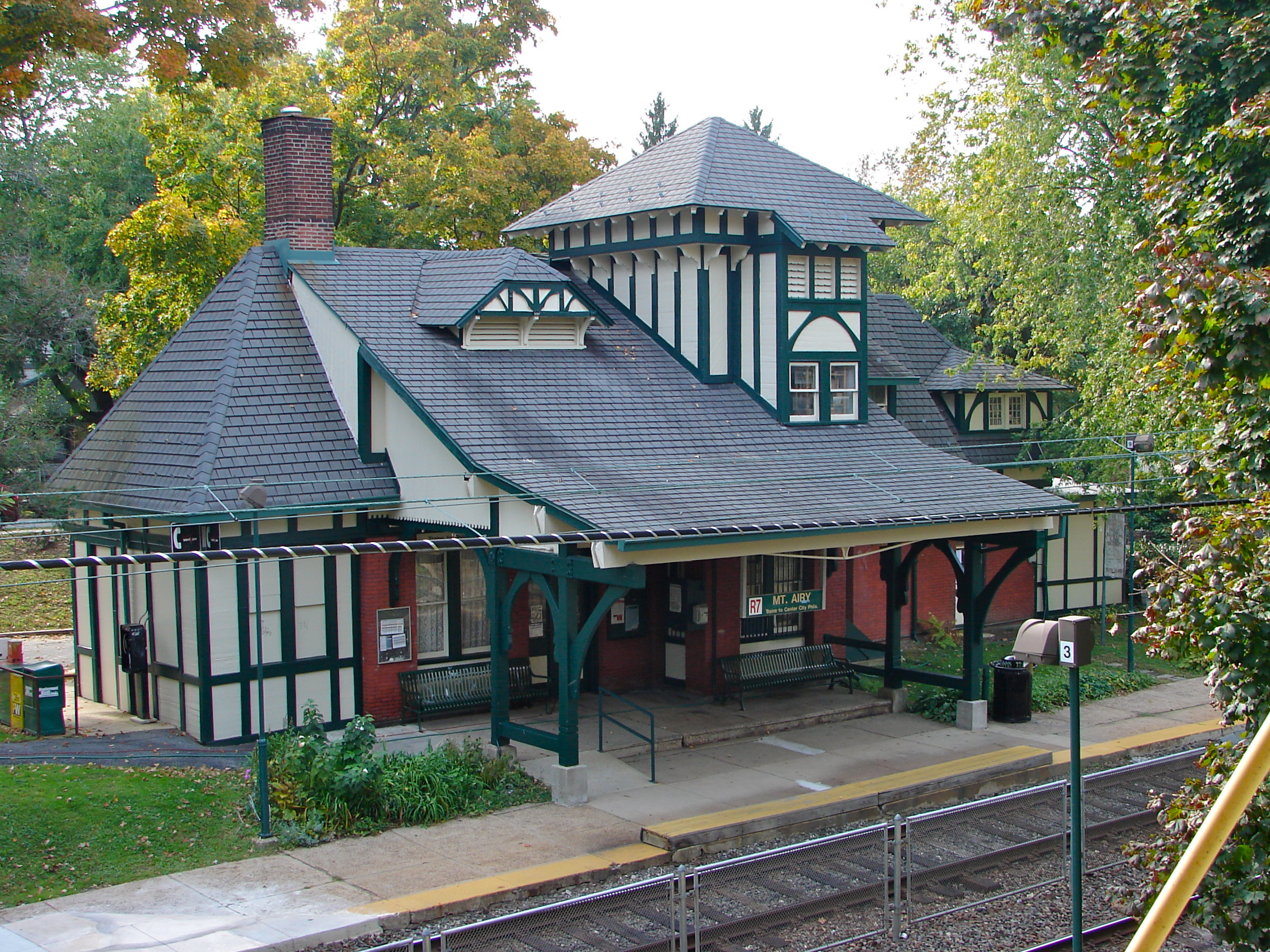

General information
- Location: 119 East Gowen Avenue between Devon and Sprague Streets, Philadelphia, Pennsylvania, U.S.
- Owner: SEPTA
- Line: Chestnut Hill East Branch
- Platforms: 2 side platforms
- Tracks: 2

Construction
- Accessible: No

Other information
- Fare zone: 2

History
- Opened: 1875
- Electrified: February 5, 1933

Services
Preceding station	SEPTA	Following station
Wyndmoor toward Chestnut Hill East	Chestnut Hill East Line	Sedgwick toward 30th Street Station
Former services
Preceding station	Reading Railroad	Following station
Mermaid toward Chestnut Hill	Chestnut Hill Branch	Sedgwick toward Philadelphia
- Mt. Airy Station
- U.S. National Register of Historic Places
- Interactive map of Mt. Airy Station
- Location: East Gowen Avenue; Philadelphia, Pennsylvania, U.S.
- Coordinates: 40°3′53.71″N 75°11′29.77″W
- Built: 1875
- Architectural style: Stick/eastlake
- NRHP reference No.: 77001186
- Added to NRHP: September 22, 1977
Location

Mount Airy station is a SEPTA Regional Rail station at 119 East Gowen Avenue between Devon and Sprague Streets, Philadelphia, Pennsylvania. The station building is listed on the National Register of Historic Places and was built in 1875 with Frank Furness as the likely architect. The National Register of Historic Places Nomination Form lists the architect as unknown, but notes the similarities to the nearby Gravers station which was designed by Furness. Both stations display an aggressively styled roofline in the Queen Anne Stick Style. The Mount Airy station's roof is described as "combining hipped, gabled, jerkinhead designs with a double splayed profile" and the Graver's Lane Station might be considered even more aggressive.

The station is in zone 2 on the Chestnut Hill East Line, on former Reading Railroad tracks, and is 9.3 track miles from Suburban Station. In 2013, this station saw 193 boardings and 159 alightings on an average weekday.

A used book store formerly occupied much of the station building.
