= Stenton station =

SEPTA train station in Philadelphia, Pennsylvania, United States

Stenton
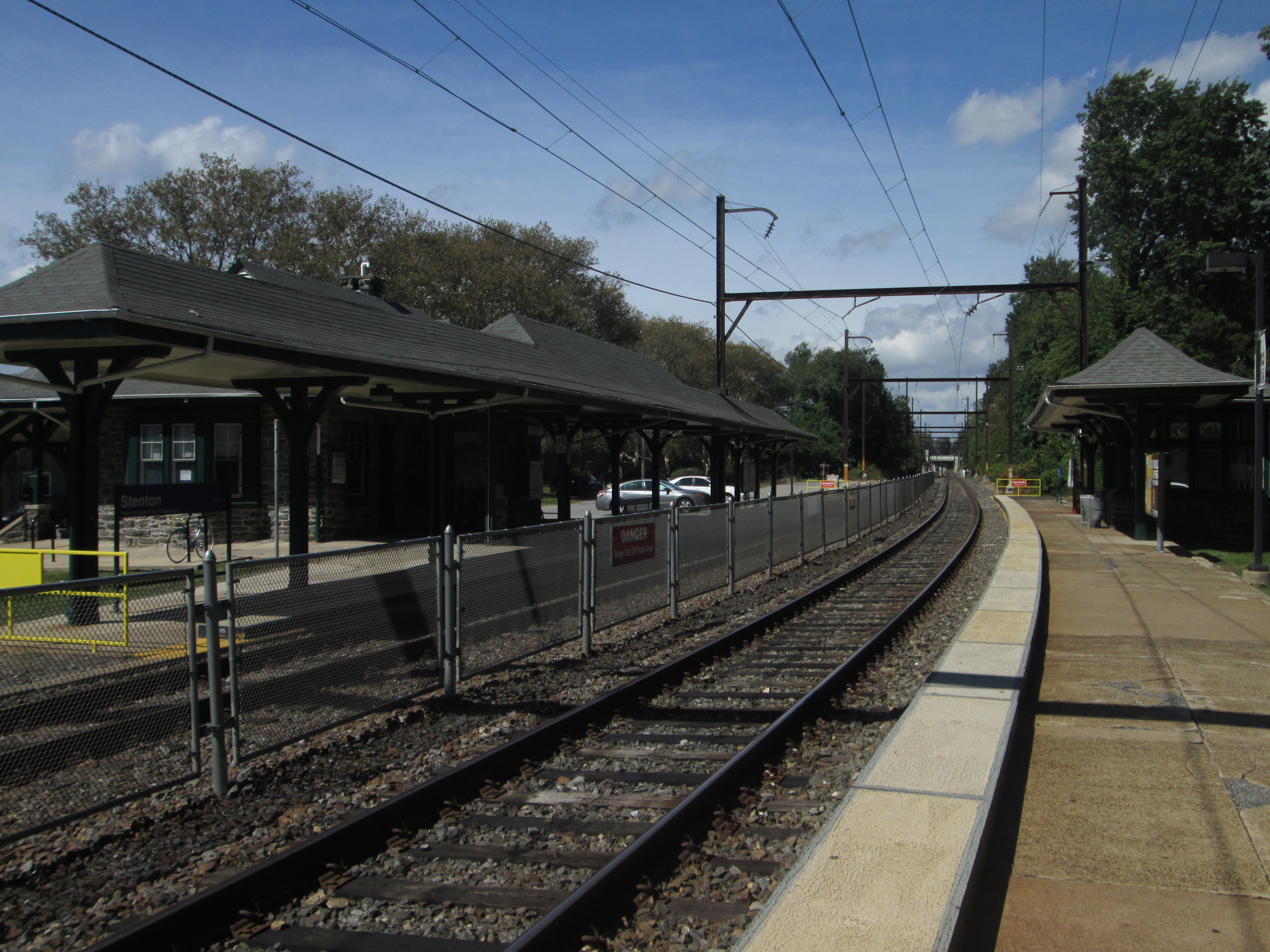
- The station depot and shelters for Stenton as seen in September 2013.

General information
- Location: 529-599 Vernon Road, between Ardleigh and Blakemore Streets, Philadelphia, Pennsylvania, U.S.
- Coordinates: 40.0605°N 75.1788°W
- Owner: SEPTA
- Line: Chestnut Hill East Branch
- Platforms: 2 side platforms
- Tracks: 2
- Connections: SEPTA City Bus: 18

Construction
- Parking: 62 spaces
- Accessible: No

Other information
- Fare zone: 2

History
- Electrified: February 5, 1933

Passengers
- 2017: 382 boardings 393 alightings (weekday average)
- Rank: 70 of 146

Services
Preceding station	SEPTA	Following station
Sedgwick toward Chestnut Hill East	Chestnut Hill East Line	Washington Lane toward 30th Street Station
Former services
Preceding station	Reading Railroad	Following station
Gorgas toward Chestnut Hill	Chestnut Hill Branch	Washington Lane toward Philadelphia
Location

Stenton station is a SEPTA Regional Rail station at 529-599 Vernon Road between Ardleigh and Blakemore Streets in Philadelphia, Pennsylvania.

The station is in zone 2 on the Chestnut Hill East Line, on former Reading Railroad tracks, and is 8.6 track miles from Suburban Station. In 2013, this station saw 430 boardings and 124 alightings on an average weekday.
