= Germantown station (SEPTA) =

SEPTA train station in Germantown, Philadelphia, Pennsylvania, United States

Germantown
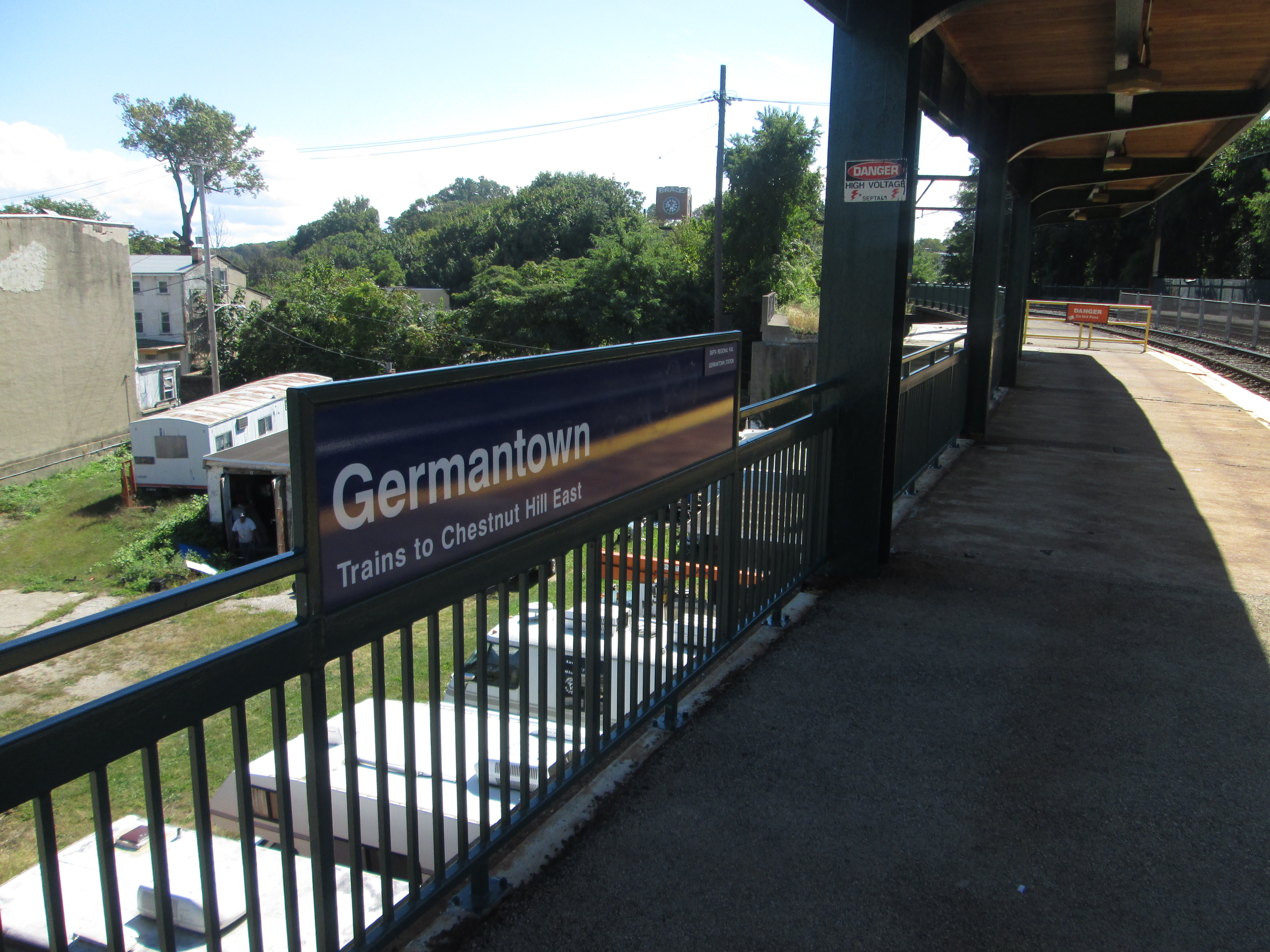
- The outbound platform at Germantown station

General information
- Location: 120–128 East Chelten Avenue, Philadelphia, Pennsylvania, U.S.
- Coordinates: 40.0379°N 75.1720°W
- Owner: SEPTA
- Line: Chestnut Hill East Branch
- Platforms: 2 side platforms
- Tracks: 2
- Connections: SEPTA City Bus: 26, 41, K

Construction
- Parking: 13 spaces
- Accessible: No

Other information
- Fare zone: 1

History
- Opened: c. 1885
- Electrified: February 5, 1933
- Former names: Chelten Avenue

Services
Preceding station	SEPTA	Following station
Washington Lane toward Chestnut Hill East	Chestnut Hill East Line	Wister toward 30th Street Station
Former services
Preceding station	Reading Railroad	Following station
Walnut Lane toward Chestnut Hill	Chestnut Hill Branch	Wingohocking toward Philadelphia
Location

Germantown station is a SEPTA Regional Rail component in Philadelphia, Pennsylvania. Located at Chelten Avenue and Baynton Street in the Germantown neighborhood, it serves the Chestnut Hill East Line.

The station is in zone 1 on the Chestnut Hill East Line, on former Reading Railroad tracks, and is 6.8 track miles from Suburban Station.

== History ==
The Germantown railway station has existed since at least 1884 when it could be found in the same place it is today on the Chestnut Hill East line. It was on SEPTA's R7 line until the regional-rail renaming.

On May 28, 2009, SEPTA approved a $1.9 million rehabilitation effort which included the Germantown station.

In 2013, this station saw 102 boardings and 140 alightings on an average weekday.

== Gallery ==
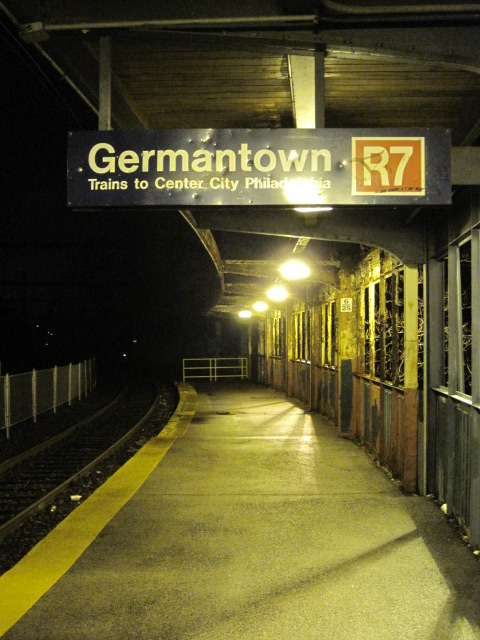
Germantown station
