= Sedgwick station =

Sedgwick station may refer to:

- Sedgwick station (CTA), Chicago, U.S.
- Sedgwick station (SEPTA), Philadelphia, U.S.
