= Washington Lane station =

SEPTA train station in Germantown, Philadelphia, Pennsylvania, United States

Washington Lane
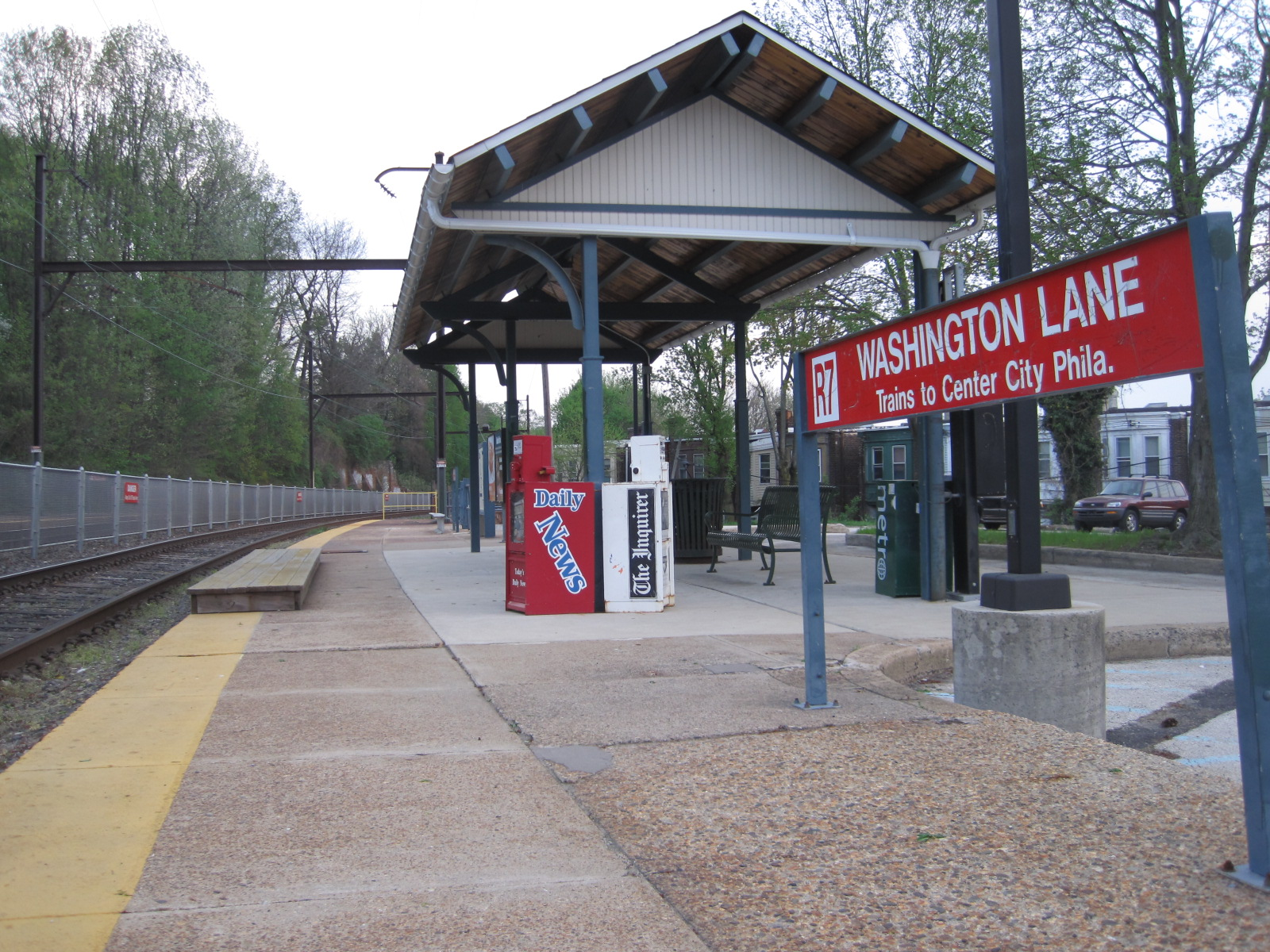
- Washington Lane platform

General information
- Location: 812–822 East Washington Lane, Philadelphia, Pennsylvania, U.S.
- Coordinates: 40.0511°N 75.1716°W
- Owner: SEPTA
- Line: Chestnut Hill East Branch
- Platforms: 2 side platforms
- Tracks: 2
- Connections: SEPTA City Bus: 81

Construction
- Parking: 41 spaces
- Accessible: No

Other information
- Fare zone: 2

History
- Electrified: February 5, 1933

Services
Preceding station	SEPTA	Following station
Stenton toward Chestnut Hill East	Chestnut Hill East Line	Germantown toward 30th Street Station
Former services
Preceding station	Reading Railroad	Following station
Stenton toward Chestnut Hill	Chestnut Hill Branch	Walnut Lane toward Philadelphia
Location

Washington Lane station is a SEPTA Regional Rail station at 812–822 East Washington Lane in Philadelphia, Pennsylvania. The station is located in the Germantown neighborhood.

The station is in zone 2 on the Chestnut Hill East Line, on former Reading Railroad tracks, and is 7.8 track miles from Suburban Station. In 2013, this station saw 163 boardings and 213 alightings on an average weekday. The station is located near the Awbury Arboretum.
