= Wyndmoor station =

SEPTA train station in Chestnut Hill, Philadelphia, Pennsylvania, United States

Coordinates: 40.0736°N 75.1970°W

Wyndmoor
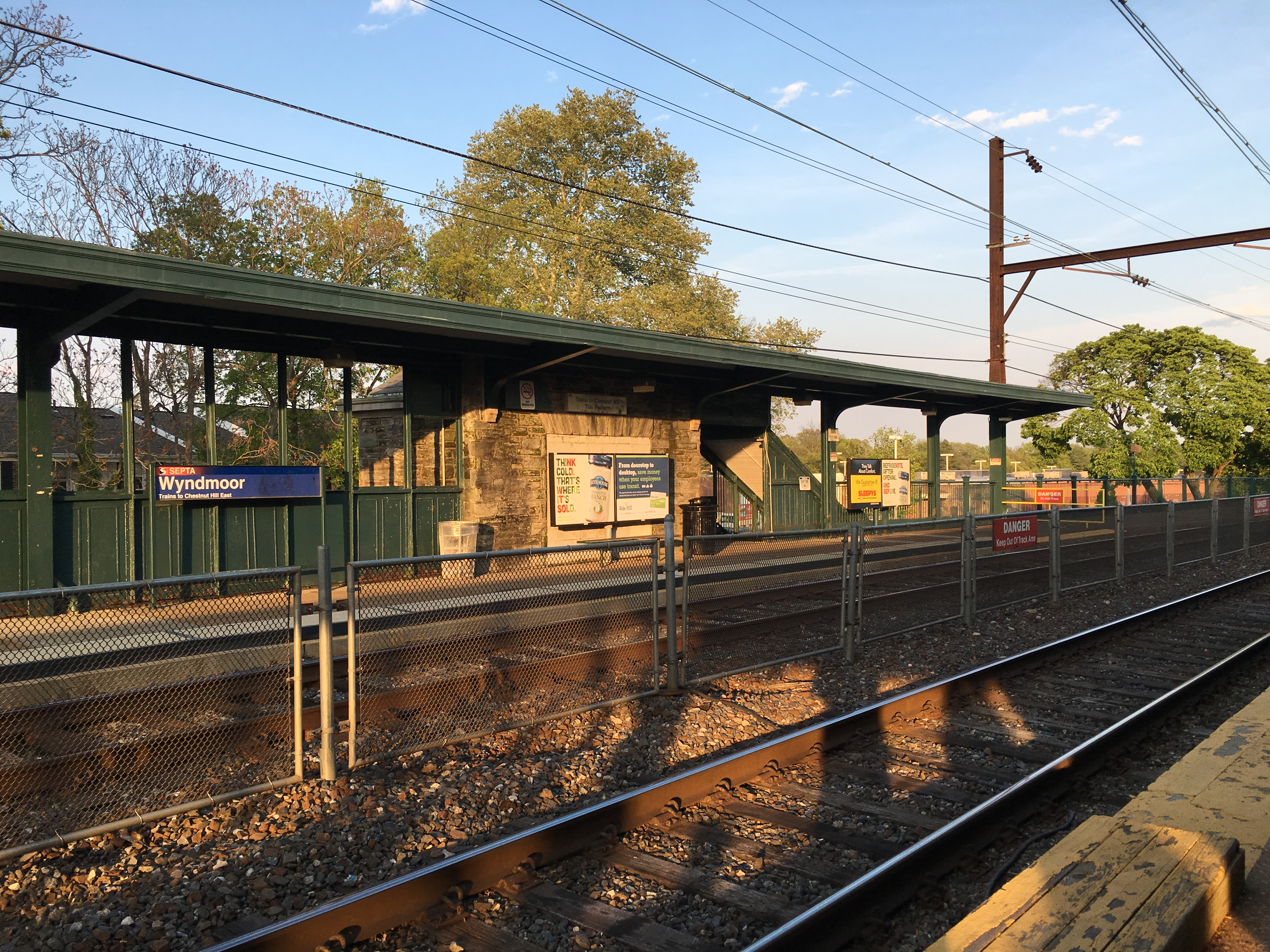
- Wyndmoor station platform

General information
- Location: 256 East Willow Grove Avenue at Wyndmoor Street, Philadelphia, Pennsylvania, U.S.
- Owner: SEPTA
- Line: Chestnut Hill East Branch
- Platforms: 2 side platforms
- Tracks: 2
- Connections: SEPTA City Bus: 77

Construction
- Parking: 130 spaces
- Accessible: No

Other information
- Fare zone: 2

History
- Opened: 1863
- Rebuilt: 1877, 1930
- Electrified: February 5, 1933

Services
Preceding station	SEPTA	Following station
Gravers toward Chestnut Hill East	Chestnut Hill East Line	Mount Airy toward 30th Street Station
Former services
Preceding station	Reading Railroad	Following station
Gravers toward Chestnut Hill	Chestnut Hill Branch	Mermaid toward Philadelphia
Location

Wyndmoor station is a SEPTA Regional Rail station at 256 East Willow Grove Avenue at Wyndmoor Street in the Chestnut Hill region of Philadelphia, Pennsylvania.

== History ==
This station can be traced as far back as 1863, with a relocation in 1877. The present station building was built by the Reading Company in 1930, when the line was elevated, and began taking in travelers from the recently closed Mermaid Avenue Reading Station.

The station is in zone 2 on the Chestnut Hill East Line, on former Reading Railroad tracks, and is 10.0 track miles from Suburban Station.

In 2013, this station saw 471 boardings and 509 alightings on an average weekday. Most regular commuters from Wyndmoor station are from Chestnut Hill and the adjacent Wyndmoor neighborhood, with some also from Erdenheim and Laverock.
