= Philadelphia, Germantown and Norristown Railroad =

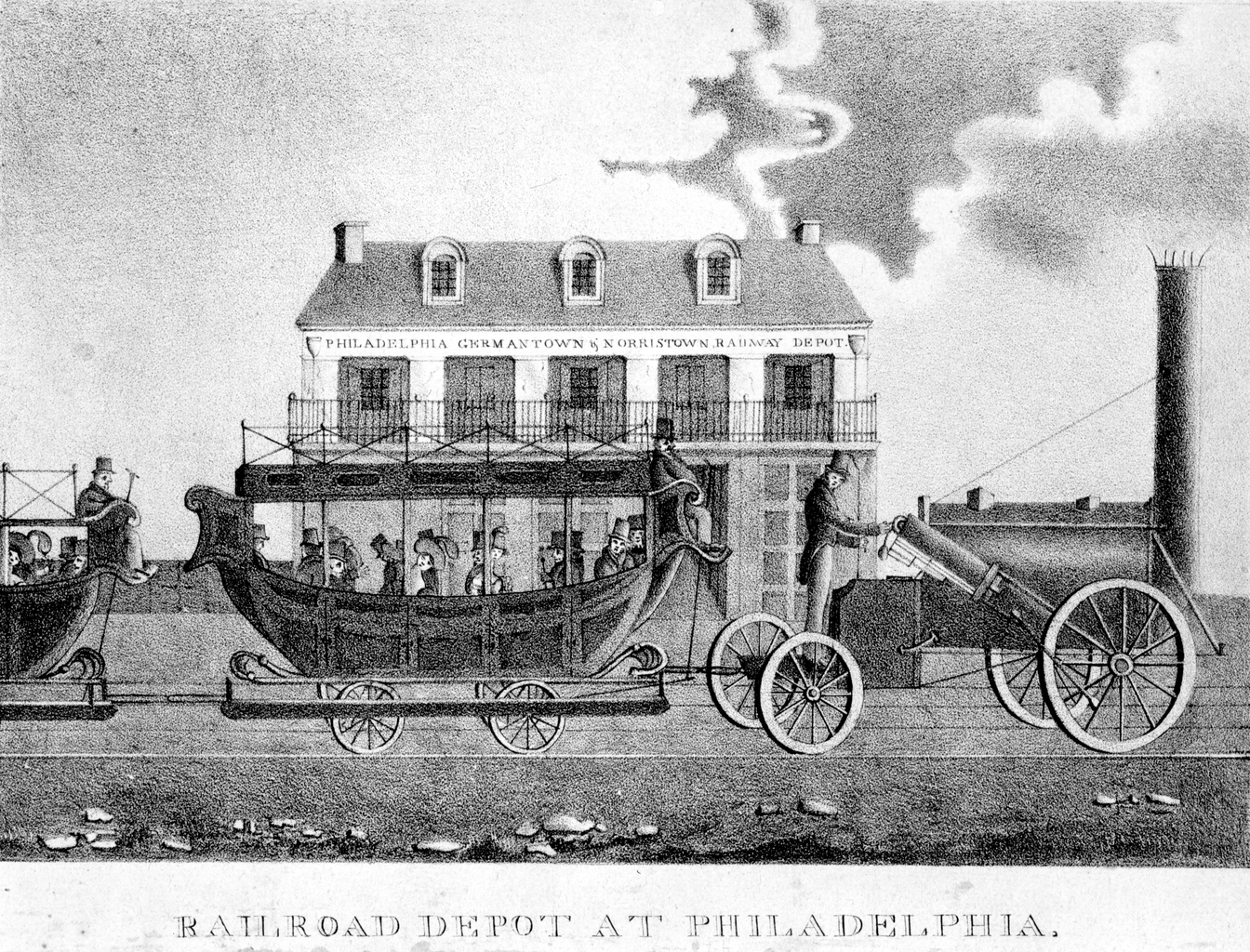
- A lithograph depicting the Philadelphia depot in 1832

Overview
- Dates of operation: 1831–1976
- Successor: Conrail; SEPTA

Technical
- Track gauge: 4 ft 8 1/2 in (1,435 mm)
- Length: 20.2 miles (32.5 km)

The Philadelphia, Germantown and Norristown Railroad (PG&N) was a railway company in the United States. It was incorporated in 1831 and opened its first line in 1832, making it one of the oldest railroads in North America. The Philadelphia and Reading Railroad, a forerunner of the Reading Company, leased the company's lines in 1870, ending its period of independent operation. Its lines are currently part of the SEPTA Regional Rail network in the Philadelphia region.

== History ==
The Philadelphia, Germantown and Norristown Railroad was incorporated on April 5, 1831. The company's initial line extended 6 miles (9.7 km) from Philadelphia to Germantown, and opened on June 6, 1832. The company abandoned its original intention to extend to Norristown from Germantown and instead built west from 16th Street Junction in what is now North Philadelphia. This line reached Manayunk on October 18, 1834, and Norristown on August 15, 1835. The PG&N's Philadelphia depot was situated at Ninth Street and Green Street.

Through the Swedes Ford Bridge Company, which it leased, the PG&N built a bridge over the Schuylkill River between Norristown and Bridgeport, Pennsylvania. The bridge, which opened in 1851, created a physical connection with the Philadelphia and Reading Railroad, whose main line ran down the west side of the river into Philadelphia. Another leased company, the Chestnut Hill Railroad, built north from the end of the original line at Germantown into Chestnut Hill. The extension, just under 4 miles (6.4 km), opened on December 1, 1854.

The Philadelphia, Germantown and Norristown also controlled the Plymouth Railroad, which was chartered in 1836 and by 1840 had built 4 miles (6.4 km) north from the Norristown Branch at Conshohocken. The Philadelphia, Germantown and Norristown took control via stock ownership in 1868, and extended the line another four miles to Oreland and a junction with the North Pennsylvania Railroad.

The Philadelphia and Reading Railroad leased the Philadelphia, Germantown and Norristown on December 1, 1870. The company continued to exist on paper, and with the Reading Company's final bankruptcy in 1976 its lines were conveyed to Conrail and SEPTA.

== Lines ==
The Philadelphia, Germantown and Norristown's lines, both those that it owned outright and those that it leased or otherwise controlled, are mostly still in use today:

- The original main line from North Broad Street to Wayne Junction is part of the SEPTA Main Line and hosts various commuter services.
- The original main line from Wayne Junction to Germantown and the former route of the Chestnut Hill Railroad forms SEPTA's Chestnut Hill East Branch and hosts the Chestnut Hill East Line service.
- The line to Norristown is now SEPTA's Norristown Branch and hosts the Manayunk/Norristown Line commuter rail service.
- The route of the Plymouth Railroad became the Plymouth Branch under the Reading and has since been abandoned.
- The bridge at Swedes Ford became less important in 1903 when a new bridge was built further north, extending southwest from Norristown to a junction with the Reading main line. The Reading sold the lease to the Federal Bridge Company in 1930 and the bridge was demolished in 1939.
