= Wayne Junction station =

SEPTA junction station in Nicetown, Philadelphia, Pennsylvania, United States

Wayne Junction
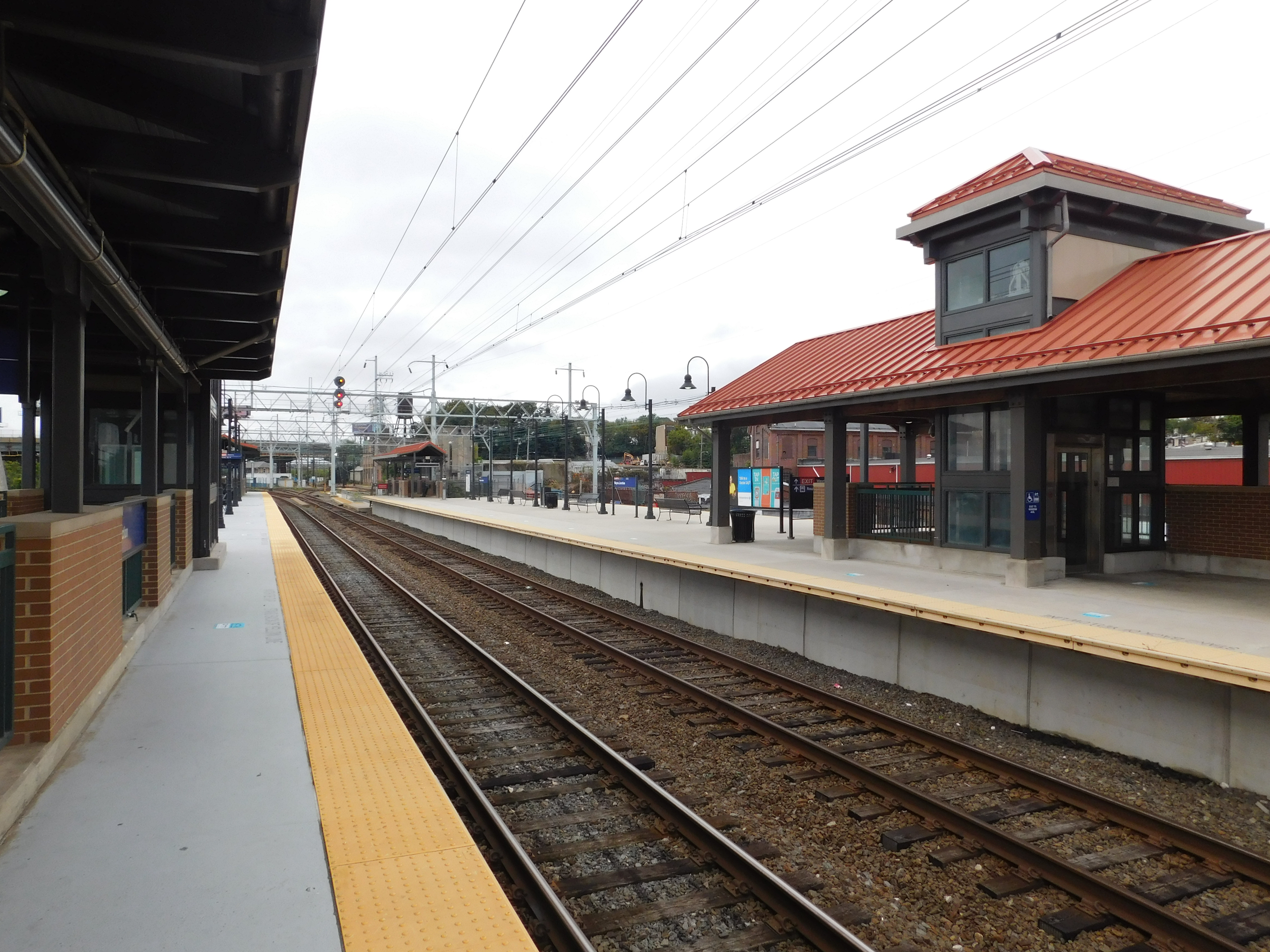
- Wayne Junction station in September 2020 after reconstruction.

General information
- Location: 4481 Wayne Avenue near Windrim Avenue; Nicetown–Tioga, Philadelphia, Pennsylvania, U.S.
- Owner: SEPTA
- Lines: Chestnut Hill East Branch; Fox Chase Branch; SEPTA Main Line
- Platforms: 2 island platforms
- Tracks: 5
- Connections: SEPTA City Bus: 2, 23, 53; SEPTA City Bus: 75

Construction
- Accessible: Yes

Other information
- Fare zone: 1

History
- Opened: 1881
- Rebuilt: 1900, 2012–2014
- Electrified: July 26, 1931

Passengers
- 2017: 375 boardings 291 alightings (weekday average)
- Rank: 72 of 146

Services
Preceding station	SEPTA	Following station
Temple University toward Airport	Airport Line	Fern Rock toward Glenside
Temple University toward 30th Street Station	Chestnut Hill East Line	Wister toward Chestnut Hill East
Temple University toward Penn Medicine Station	Fox Chase Line	Olney toward Fox Chase
North Broad toward Penn Medicine Station	Lansdale/Doylestown Line	Fern Rock toward Doylestown
Temple University toward Penn Medicine Station	Warminster Line	Fern Rock toward Warminster
West Trenton Line does not stop here
Former services
Preceding station	SEPTA	Following station
Temple University toward Chestnut Hill East	Chestnut Hill East Line	Fishers Closed 1992 toward 30th Street Station
Preceding station	Reading Railroad	Following station
North Broad Street toward Philadelphia	Bethlehem Branch	Logan toward Bethlehem
Nicetown toward Philadelphia	New York Branch	Logan toward Bound Brook
Nicetown toward Philadelphia	Chestnut Hill Branch	Fishers toward Chestnut Hill
North Broad Street toward Philadelphia	Frankford Branch	Olney toward Frankford
Philadelphia Terminus	Newtown Branch	Olney toward Newtown
Philadelphia Terminus	New Hope Branch	Jenkintown toward New Hope
Preceding station	Baltimore and Ohio Railroad	Following station
Philadelphia toward Chicago	Main Line	Plainfield toward Jersey City
Philadelphia toward Chicago	Main Line Until 1926	Bound Brook toward New York
Philadelphia Terminus	Philadelphia – Jersey City Local	Jenkintown toward Jersey City
Reading Terminal Terminus	Philadelphia – Jersey City Local	Jenkintown toward Jersey City
- Wayne Junction Station, Philadelphia and Reading Railroad
- U.S. Historic district – Contributing property
- Interactive map of Wayne Junction Station, Philadelphia and Reading Railroad
- Coordinates: 40°1′22.8″N 75°9′34.2″W
- Architect: Wilson Brothers and Company
- Architectural style: Renaissance Revival style
- Part of: Wayne Junction Historic District (ID12000223)
- Added to NRHP: April 16, 2012
- Wayne Junction station
- U.S. Historic district – Contributing property
- Part of: Colonial Germantown Historic District (ID66000678)
- Added to NRHP: October 15, 1966
Location

Wayne Junction station is a SEPTA Regional Rail junction station located at 4481 Wayne Avenue, extending along Windrim Avenue to Germantown Avenue. The station is located in the Nicetown neighborhood of Philadelphia. Wayne Junction serves as a multi-modal transfer point between five of SEPTA's regional rail lines as well as 4 major transit routes – the Route 75 Trackless Trolley and Routes 2, 23 and 53. Routes 71 & 81 also operate express bus services here, but do not have a stop. The station served more than 321,000 riders annually in 2018.

== Service ==
The Chestnut Hill East Line joins the SEPTA Main Line at Wayne Junction. Wayne Junction is the last station before the Fox Chase Line splits off the SEPTA Main Line, at Newtown Junction. Additionally, Wayne Junction is served by the Warminster Line, West Trenton Line, and Lansdale/Doylestown Line on the SEPTA Main Line.

== Station ==
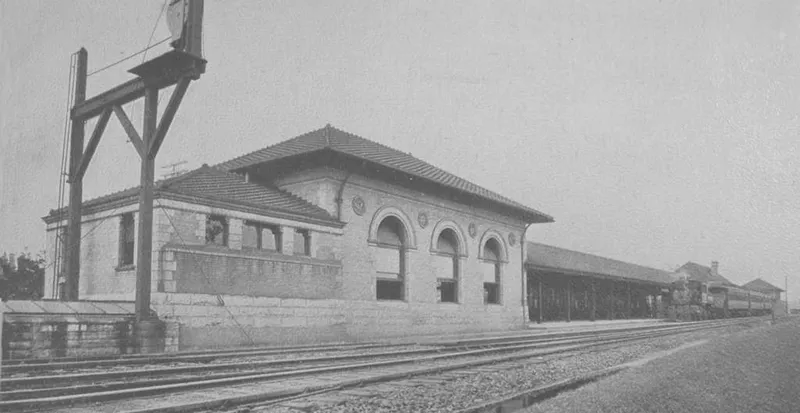
Wayne Junction station in 1914

The original station building was designed by architect Frank Furness and constructed in 1881. The current station building was designed in 1900 by architects Wilson Brothers & Company. An old post card once boasted that "more trains stop here than at any other station in the world."

The station, located in fare zone one, does have a sales office but lacks any dedicated parking spaces. In 2015, Wayne Junction underwent a $11,165,600 renovation that included a new low level railway platform, an additional high-level platform in the inbound side, two new elevators, and new canopies and windscreens.

In FY 2013, Wayne Junction station had a weekday average of 527 boardings and 521 alightings.

The SEPTA's Roberts Yard and Midvale District Bus Garage are nearby to this station.

== History ==
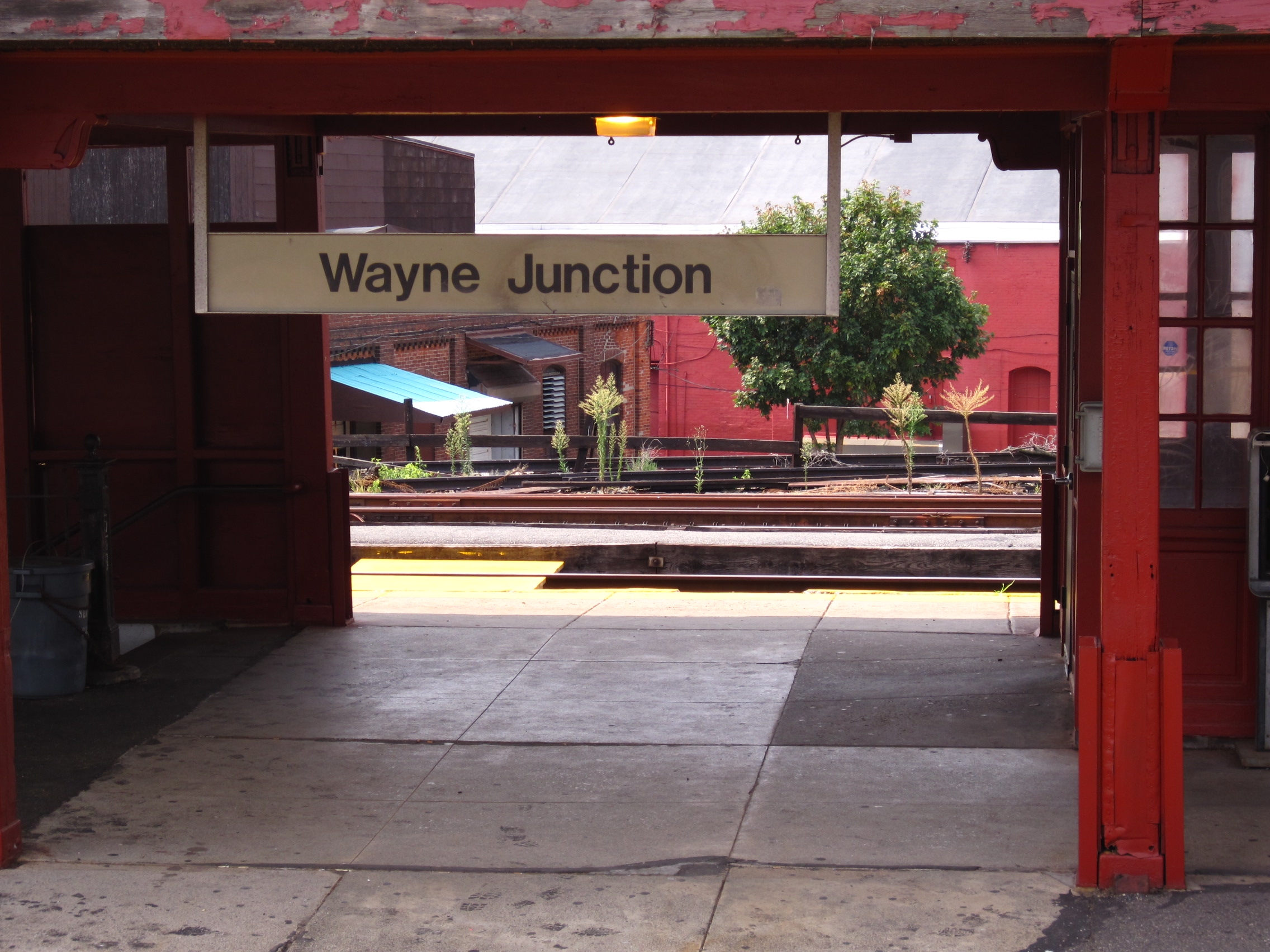
Detail of station sign at Wayne Junction station before reconstruction

For most of the first half of the 20th century, Wayne Junction served as the Reading Railroad's counterpart to the Pennsylvania Railroad's North Philadelphia station, 2 miles (3.2 km) away. It served a very busy and prosperous business and residential area, drawing from North Philadelphia, Nicetown, Tioga, Logan, Germantown and other points. In addition to the extensive commuter network, service was provided by the Reading Railroad on a regular basis to New York via the Jersey Central and to Bethlehem and beyond on the Lehigh Valley Railroad to Upstate New York and Toronto. Beginning in the 1890s, Baltimore and Ohio Railroad passenger trains between Washington and New York City, including its famed Royal Blue, also stopped at Wayne Junction, using Reading and Jersey Central rails north of Philadelphia. The station was useful for transfers between Reading trains and B&O trains. This was more advantageous than changing between the Reading Terminal and the B&O's 24th & Chestnut Station as those Philadelphia stations were several blocks apart.

Until the B&O discontinued passenger service on the line in April 1958, it provided regular service to Washington with through sleepers to the West, including Chicago, St. Louis, and Los Angeles on such trains as the Capitol Limited and National Limited. Reading Railroad long distance trains included the Interstate Express and the Scranton Flyer. The station provided a baggage room and lunch room, as well as the usual telegraph office. On October 25, 1959, Wayne Junction was the starting point for the first of the Reading's Iron Horse Rambles excursions featuring their T-1 class steam locomotives. The surrounding neighborhood was a busy shopping area and provided additional services.

The station has been a contributing property in the Colonial Germantown Historic District since 1966, and the Wayne Junction Historic District since 2012.

== Redevelopment ==
In September 2017, developer Ken Weinstein outlined a $12 million proposal to redevelop properties in the immediate vicinity of the Station including 32 apartment units at the Max Levy Autograph Co. building, a pocket park on a vacant lot across the street, a 1950s diner, an office building, an artisanal manufacturing site, and a barbecue and brewery. Most of the development is taking place in a restored factory and warehouse structures, making use of the federal Historic Tax Credit program.

In July 2018, the Pennsylvania state Historic Preservation Review Board approved the Philadelphia Historical Commission's request to create the Wayne Junction National Historical District, a collection of eight large-scale industrial buildings built between the late-19th and mid-20th century surrounding the Station. The eight properties include the Train Station at 4481 Wayne Avenue, New Glen Echo Mills at 130 W Berkley Street, Brown Instrument Company at 4433 Wayne Avenue, the Max Levy Autograph at 212-220 Roberts Avenue, Arguto Oilless Bearing Company at 149 W Berkley Street, Blaisdell Paper Pencil Company at 137-45 Berkley Street, The Keystone Dry Plate & Film Works / Moore Push Pin building at 113-29 Berkley Street, and 200-10 Roberts Avenue.

== See also ==
- Baltimore & Ohio Railroad station (Philadelphia)
- North Philadelphia station
- Reading Terminal
