= Wister station =

SEPTA train station in Germantown, Philadelphia, Pennsylvania, United States

Wister
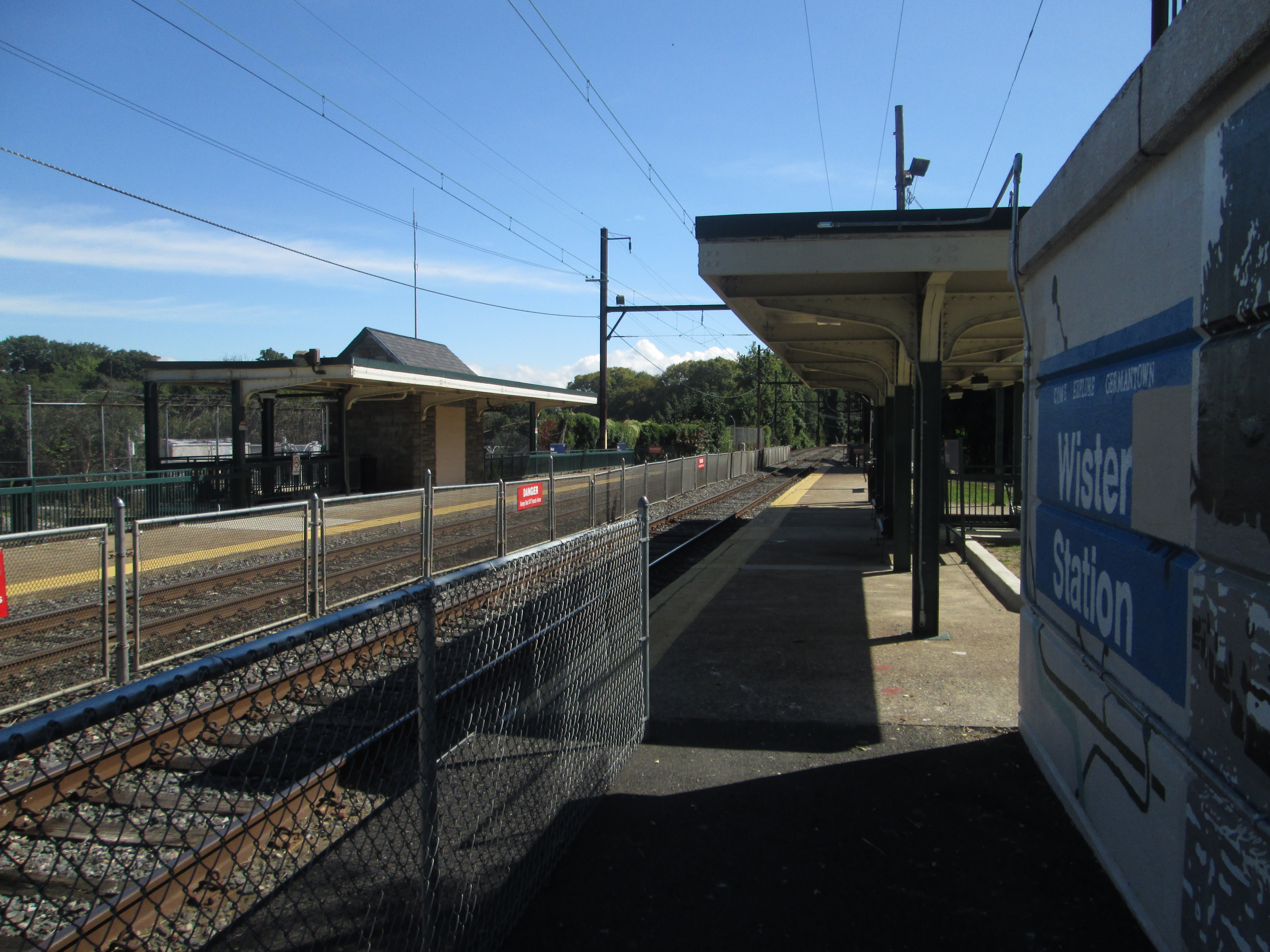
- Wister station in September 2013. A mural depicting "Wister Station" is visible on the right-side wall,

General information
- Location: Ashmead & Rubicam Streets, Philadelphia, Pennsylvania, U.S.
- Coordinates: 40.0362°N 75.1615°W
- Owner: SEPTA
- Line: Chestnut Hill East Branch
- Platforms: 2 side platforms
- Tracks: 2
- Connections: SEPTA City Bus: 41

Construction
- Accessible: No

Other information
- Fare zone: 1

History
- Opened: 1932
- Electrified: February 5, 1933

Services
Preceding station	SEPTA	Following station
Germantown toward Chestnut Hill East	Chestnut Hill East Line	Wayne Junction toward 30th Street Station
Germantown toward Chestnut Hill East	Chestnut Hill East Line	Fishers Closed 1992 toward 30th Street Station
Former services
Preceding station	Reading Railroad	Following station
Wingohocking toward Chestnut Hill	Chestnut Hill Branch	Fishers toward Philadelphia
Location

Wister station is a SEPTA Regional Rail station at Ashmead and Rubicam Streets in the Germantown neighborhood of Philadelphia, Pennsylvania. The station is named after the nearby Wister Street.

The station is in zone 1 on the Chestnut Hill East Line, on former Reading Railroad tracks, and is 6.1 track miles from Suburban Station. In 2013, this station saw 55 boardings and 70 alightings on an average weekday.

Reading Railroad built Wister station in 1932, and it is the last stop inbound on the Chestnut Hill East Line (toward Central Philadelphia) before Wayne Junction station, where that line merges with the Warminster, West Trenton, Lansdale/Doylestown, and Fox Chase Lines.
