= Temple University station =

SEPTA train station in Philadelphia, Pennsylvania, United States

Temple University
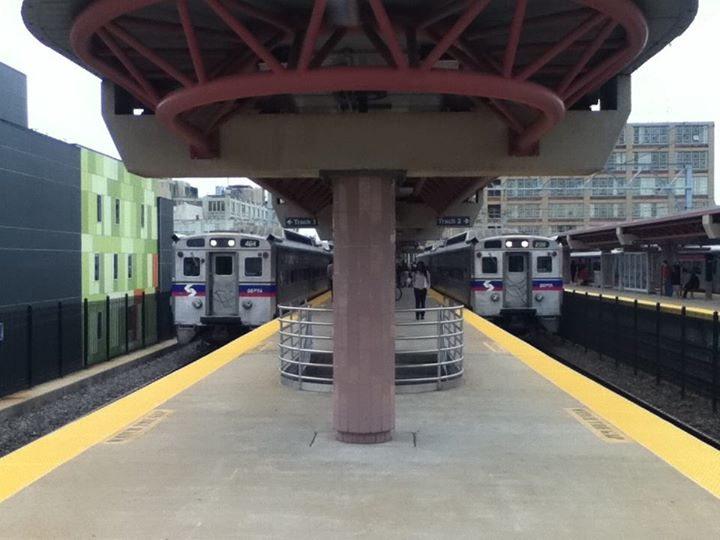
- Two Silverliner IV trains entering Temple University station

General information
- Location: 915 West Berks Street; Philadelphia, Pennsylvania
- Coordinates: 39°58′54″N 75°08′58″W
- Owner: SEPTA
- Line: SEPTA Main Line
- Platforms: 2 island platforms
- Tracks: 4
- Connections: SEPTA City Bus: 3, 23, 47

Construction
- Accessible: Yes

Other information
- Fare zone: CC

History
- Opened: 1911
- Rebuilt: 1992

Passengers
- 2017: 3,191 boardings 2,682 alightings (weekday average)
- Rank: 4 of 146

Services
Preceding station	SEPTA	Following station
Jefferson Station toward Airport	Airport Line	Wayne Junction toward Glenside
Jefferson Station toward Chestnut Hill West	Chestnut Hill West Line	Terminus
Jefferson Station toward Wawa Station	Media/Wawa Line	Terminus
Jefferson Station toward Thorndale	Paoli/Thorndale Line	Terminus
Jefferson Station toward Trenton	Trenton Line	Terminus
Jefferson Station toward Newark	Wilmington/Newark Line	Terminus
Jefferson Station toward 30th Street Station	Chestnut Hill East Line	Wayne Junction toward Chestnut Hill East
Jefferson Station toward Penn Medicine Station	Fox Chase Line	Wayne Junction toward Fox Chase
Jefferson Station toward Penn Medicine Station	Lansdale/Doylestown Line	North Broad toward Doylestown
Jefferson Station toward Penn Medicine Station	Manayunk/Norristown Line	North Broad toward Norristown–Elm Street
Jefferson Station toward Penn Medicine Station	Warminster Line	Wayne Junction toward Warminster
Jefferson Station toward Penn Medicine Station	West Trenton Line	Fern Rock toward West Trenton
Former services (SEPTA)
Preceding station	SEPTA	Following station
Spring Garden Street toward Reading Terminal	Bethlehem Line	Wayne Junction toward Allentown
Spring Garden Street toward Reading Terminal	Chestnut Hill East Line	Wayne Junction toward Chestnut Hill East
Spring Garden Street toward Reading Terminal	Newtown Line	Wayne Junction toward Newtown
Spring Garden Street toward Reading Terminal	Manayunk/Norristown Line	North Broad toward Norristown–Elm Street
Spring Garden Street toward Reading Terminal	Lansdale/Doylestown Line	North Broad toward Doylestown
Spring Garden Street toward Reading Terminal	Warminster Line	Wayne Junction toward Warminster
Spring Garden Street toward Reading Terminal	West Trenton Line	Wayne Junction toward Newark Penn Station
Pottsville Line did not stop here
Former services (Reading)
Preceding station	Reading Railroad	Following station
Spring Garden Street toward Philadelphia	Main Line	North Broad Street toward Pottsville
Spring Garden Street toward Philadelphia	Bethlehem Branch	North Broad Street toward Bethlehem
Spring Garden Street toward Philadelphia	New York Branch	North Broad Street toward Bound Brook
Spring Garden Street toward Philadelphia	Norristown Branch	North Broad Street toward Elm Street
Girard Avenue toward Philadelphia	Chestnut Hill Branch	North Broad Street toward Chestnut Hill
Track layout
Location

Temple University station is an above-ground SEPTA Regional Rail station located at the eastern edge of the Temple University campus at 915 West Berks Street between 9th and 10th Streets, in the Cecil B. Moore section of Lower North Philadelphia, Pennsylvania. The station is in the Center City fare zone, although the station itself is located in North Philadelphia.

There is a small ticket kiosk located at the base of the stairs on the street level. Temple University maintains a security kiosk at street level. Stairways and two elevators lead up to the high-level platforms at track level. There are two island platforms serving four tracks. Each platform is 380 feet (120 meters) long, long enough to platform four cars with only the end doors being used. The platforms have a canopy overhead and some wind-breaking walls but are otherwise exposed to the weather.

This station is located approximately 2.6 track miles from Suburban Station. In FY 2005, Temple University station was the fourth busiest station in SEPTA's Regional Rail system, with 2,448 average total weekday boardings and 2,593 average weekday alightings. The station also has two large bicycle racks that both have roofs above them to protect bikes against the weather. The station can easily accommodate 30+ bicycles. The racks are also in full view of the 24-hour security guard.

== Station history ==
Built in 1911, the old Temple University station achieved infamy in November 1984 when SEPTA was forced to shut down the Reading side of the railroad above North Broad Street Station. A few days after the Center City Commuter Connection and Market East station (now Jefferson Station) fully opened, some of the girders supporting the tracks in the platform area on the bridge over the avenue were discovered to be in imminent danger of collapse. The emergency repairs, completed early in 1985, included demolishing the station and replacing it with temporary wooden low-level platforms and steel stairs which served until the new station opened. This event helped draw attention to the deterioration of North American railroad and transit infrastructure; the two-year-long RailWorks project which resulted would provide a permanent, modern station at a location more convenient to Temple's campus.

The station was opened in 1992 and was built for $37 million as part of SEPTA's RailWorks project to rebuild the Reading Railroad viaduct in North Philadelphia. The station sits on the Reading side of the system and almost all trains stop here. The new station replaced the older Temple University station, which was originally named Columbia Avenue (a street since renamed Cecil B. Moore Avenue). The old station, located at 39.977465°N 75.149835°W, had two island platforms serving all four tracks, but was served by only a few peak hour trains by the time SEPTA began operation of the railroad.

== Station layout ==
The station has two island platforms serving four tracks.

== Gallery ==
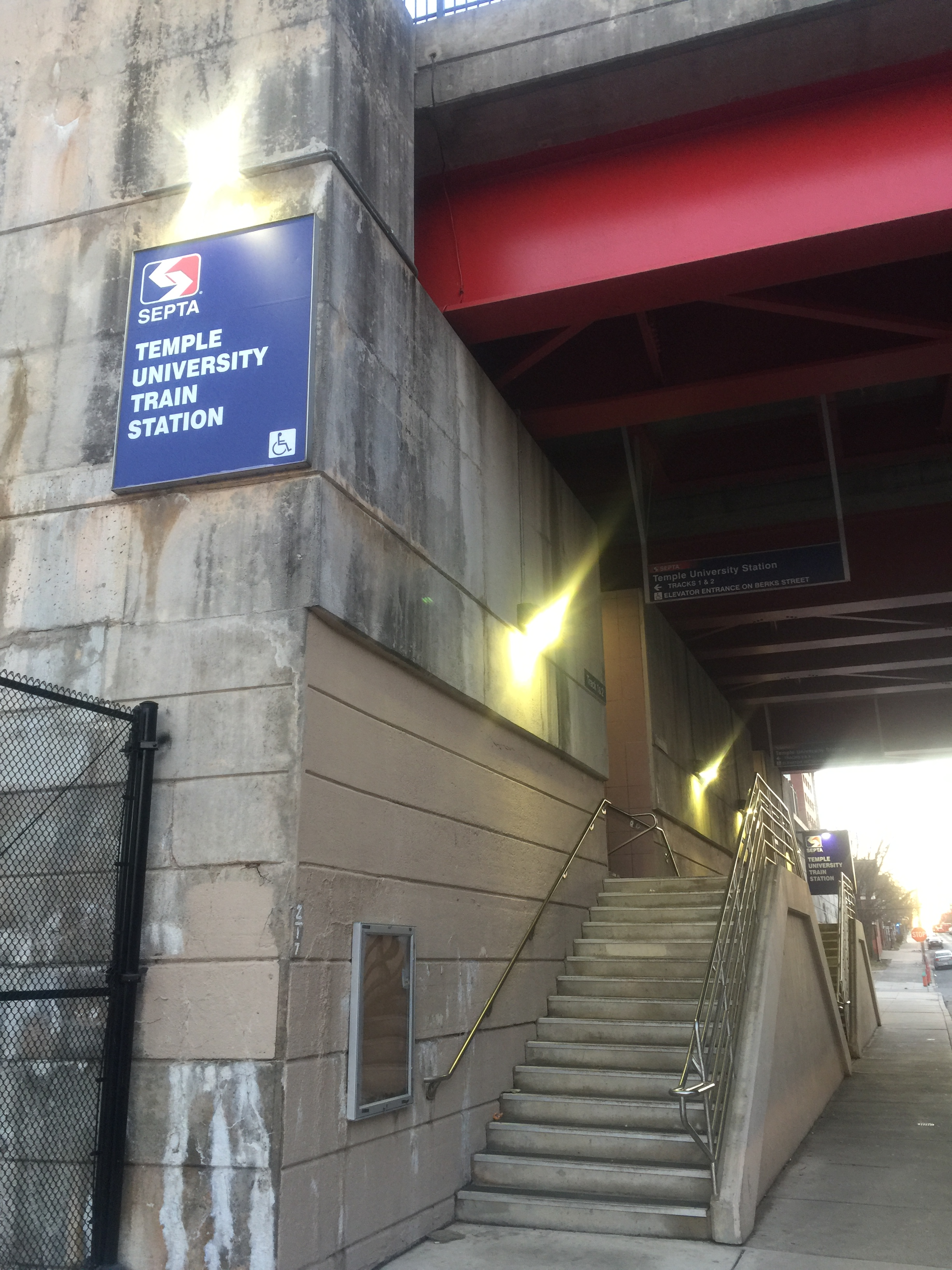
Norris Street entrance

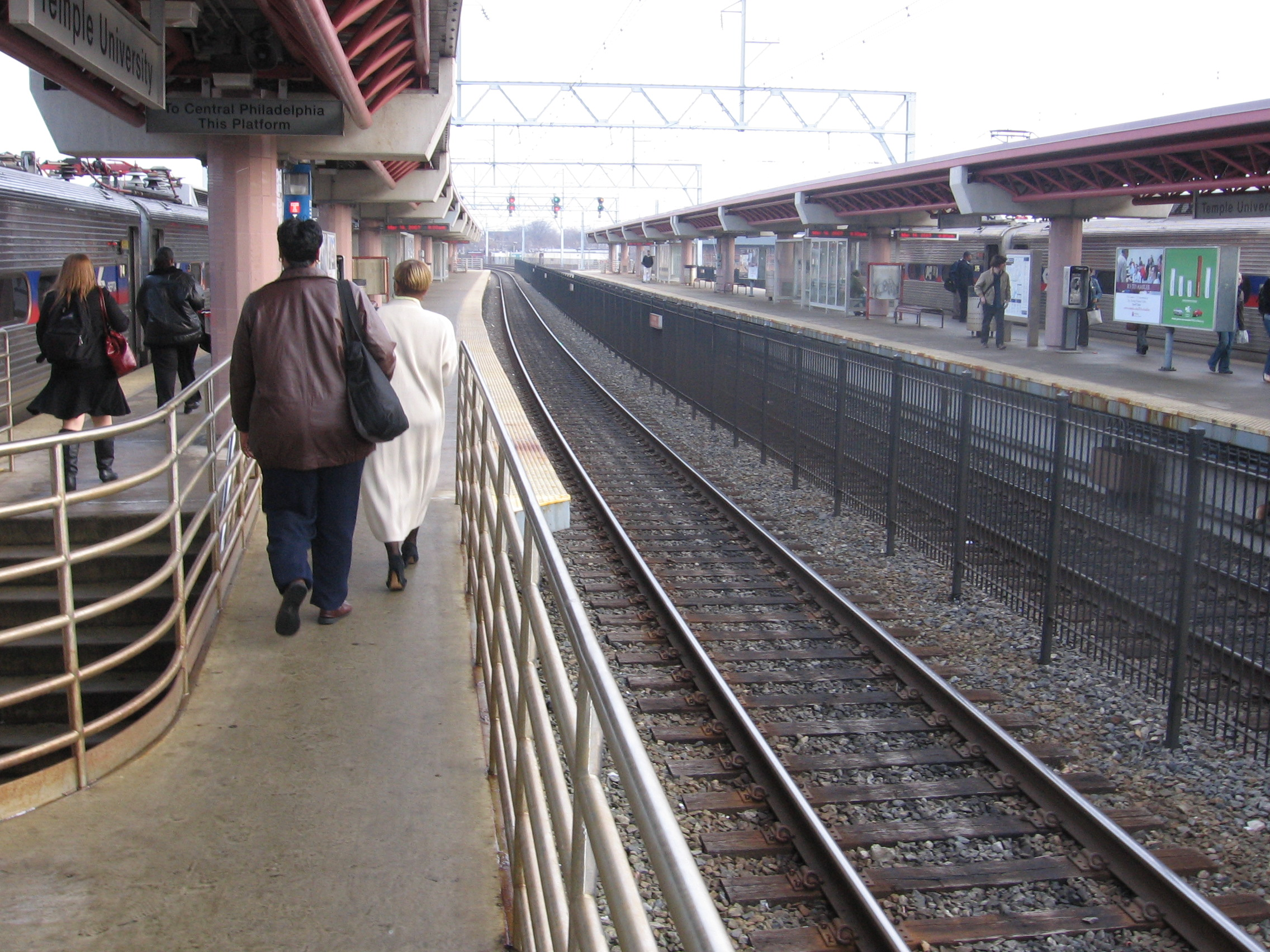
Station platform facing north

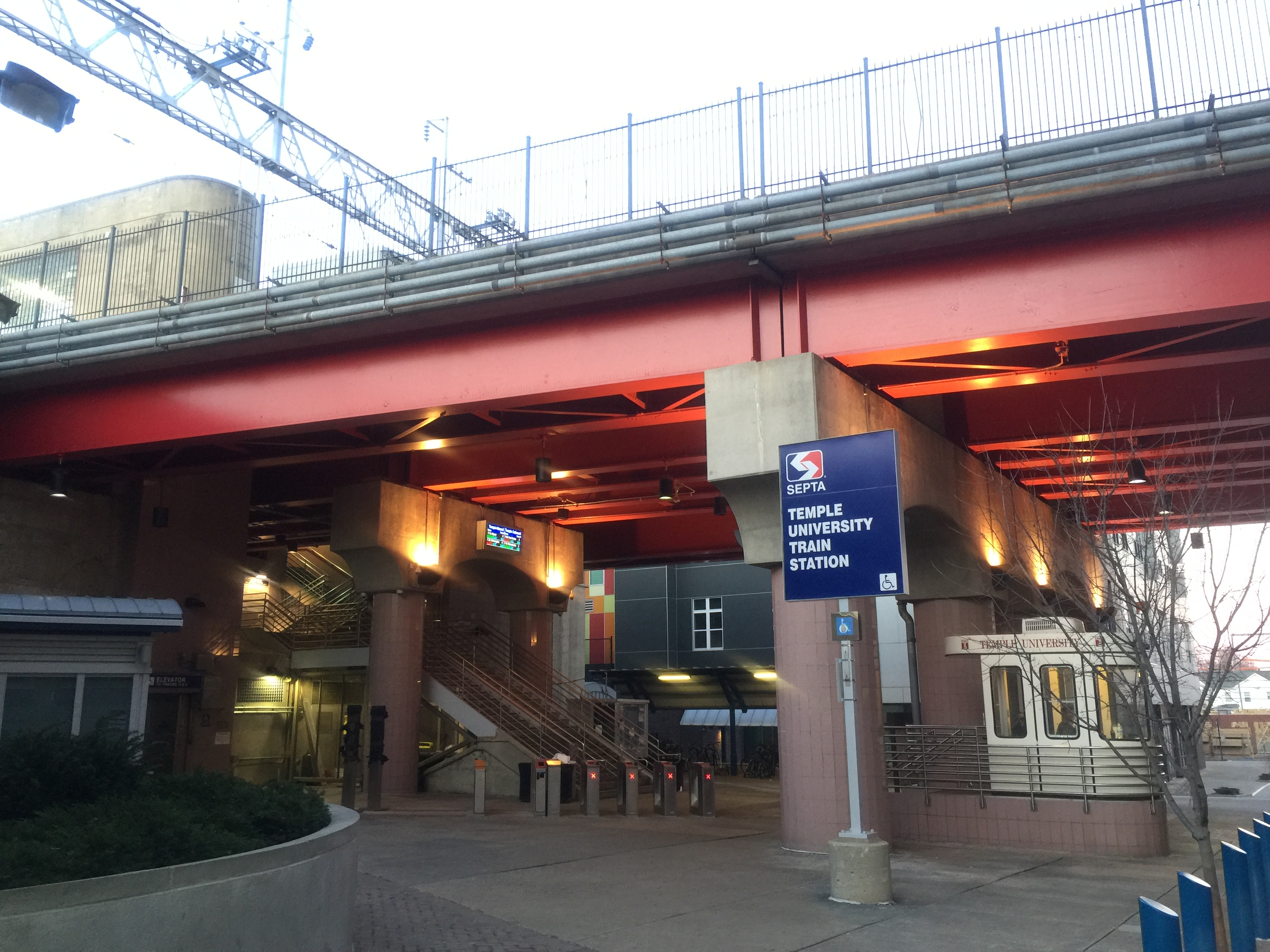
Front entrance
