= Francis Cope House =

Historic building in Philadelphia, US

Coordinates: 40.0506°N 75.1681°W

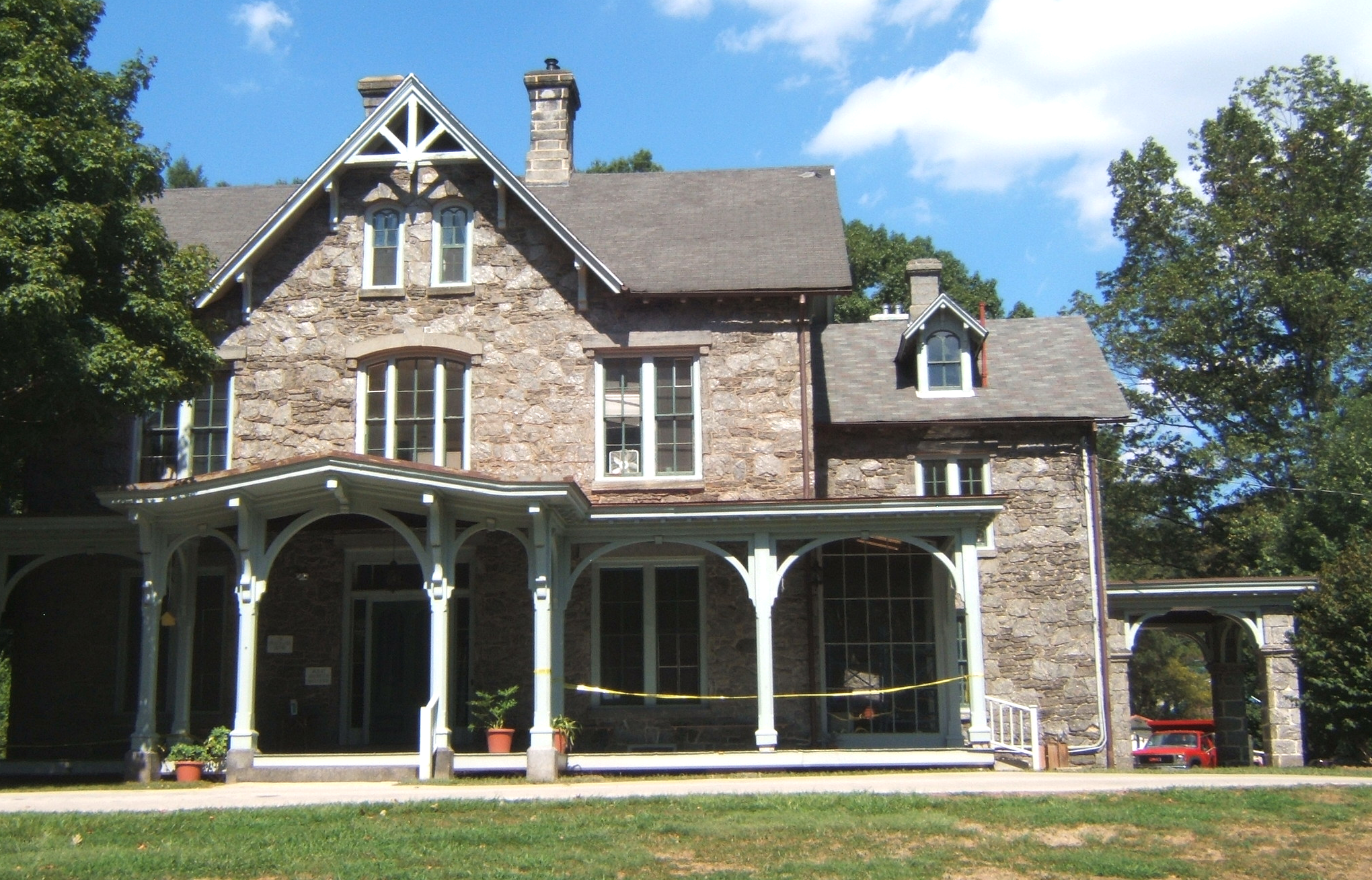
The Francis Cope House.

The Francis Cope House is a historic building located on the grounds of the Awbury Arboretum in the U.S. city of Philadelphia, Pennsylvania. Nowadays it is a rentable space, owned by Awbury Arboretum.

== History ==
A Quaker shipping merchant by the name of Henry Cope bought the Awbury property in 1852, and it served as a summer estate for his family. Awbury was named for Avebury, the English town where he was born. He bought the forty-acre property by his daughter and son-in-law, Mary Cope and John Smith Haines. In 1861, Henry's oldest son, a man by the name of Francis Reeve Cope and his wife Anna built their house, which is the Francis Cope House. Soon the Germantown property became a regular year-round home for the Cope-Haines family. For them, many houses were built throughout the 1860s-1920s.

== Architecture ==
The Francis Cope House is made largely of Wissahickon schist, which was harvested from a nearby Washington Lane quarry.
