= Awbury Arboretum =

Nonprofit arboretum and estate in Philadelphia, Pennsylvania, United States

Coordinates: 40°03′06″N 75°10′08″W

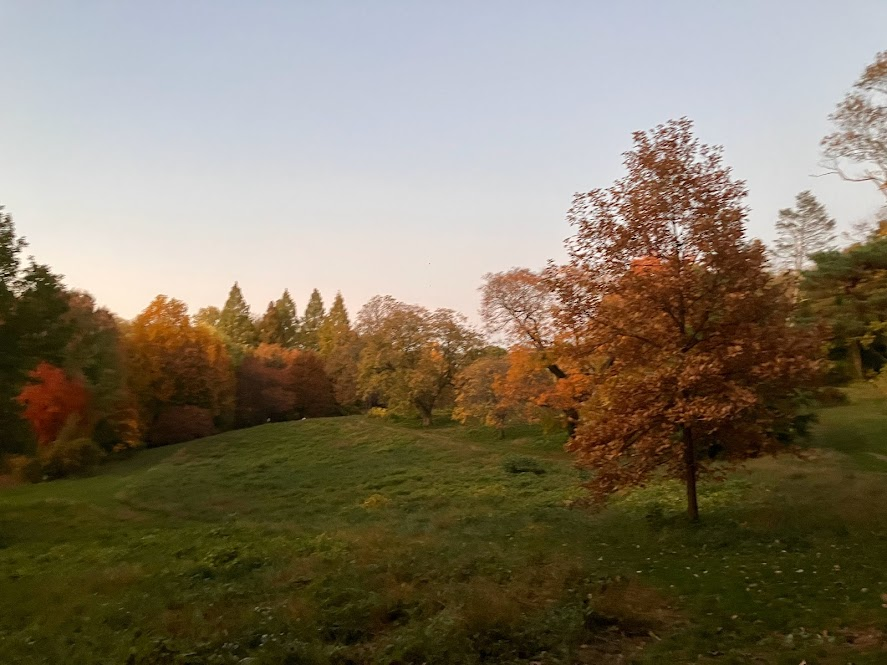
- The wildflower meadow in fall.
- Interactive map of Awbury Arboretum
- Type: Arboretum
- Location: Germantown, Philadelphia, Pennsylvania
- Area: 55 acres (22 ha)
- Website: Official website

Awbury Arboretum 55 acres (22 ha) is a nonprofit arboretum and estate located at 1 Awbury Road in Germantown, Philadelphia, Pennsylvania. Its grounds are open daily without charge. Established in 1916, it then became a nonprofit organization in 1984.

== History ==
The arboretum dates back to 1852, when Henry Cope purchased the property. The grounds were laid out in the English landscape tradition, with advice from noted landscape architect William Saunders. A number of houses were constructed on the property; all are now privately owned with the exception of the Francis Cope House (1860) which is now the Arboretum headquarters. The Cope family formally established the arboretum in 1916; it became a nonprofit organization in 1984.

The arboretum lies entirely within the Awbury Historic District, a National Historic District designated in 2001.

== Trees ==
The arboretum is laid out as a series of open spaces, with clusters of trees and shrubs framing long vistas. Among its many mature trees, the arboretum contains a State Champion River Birch (Betula nigra), and notable specimens of American Linden (Tilia americana), American Sycamore (Platanus occidentalis), and Paper Birch (Betula papyrifera).

Other trees in the collection include Acer rubrum, Amelanchier canadensis, Carpinus caroliniana, Chionanthus virginicus, Cornus alternifolia, Cornus amomum, Cornus florida, Corylus americana, Fraxinus americana, Fraxinus pennsylvanica, Liriodendron tulipifera, Nyssa sylvatica, Prunus serotina, Quercus alba, Quercus palustris, Quercus prinus, and Quercus rubra. Shrubs include Aronia arbutifolia, Aronia melanocarpa, Lindera benzoin, Viburnum dentatum, and Viburnum prunifolium.

== Layout ==
The arboretum contains two different man-made ponds, which are connected via a small stream. The largest pond is by the SEPTA Washington Lane station entrance, which also leads you into a wildflower meadow (which is right by Martin Luther King Highschool and many privately owned houses). From there, a trail through the woods takes you to the Francis Cope House, more meadows, and a wooded path. Across the street, there is a farm with goats and chickens, a community garden, and a playground.

== See also ==
- Awbury Historic District
- List of botanical gardens in the United States
- List of parks in Philadelphia
- Wyck House
