= Gravers station =

SEPTA train station in Philadelphia, Pennsylvania, United States

Gravers
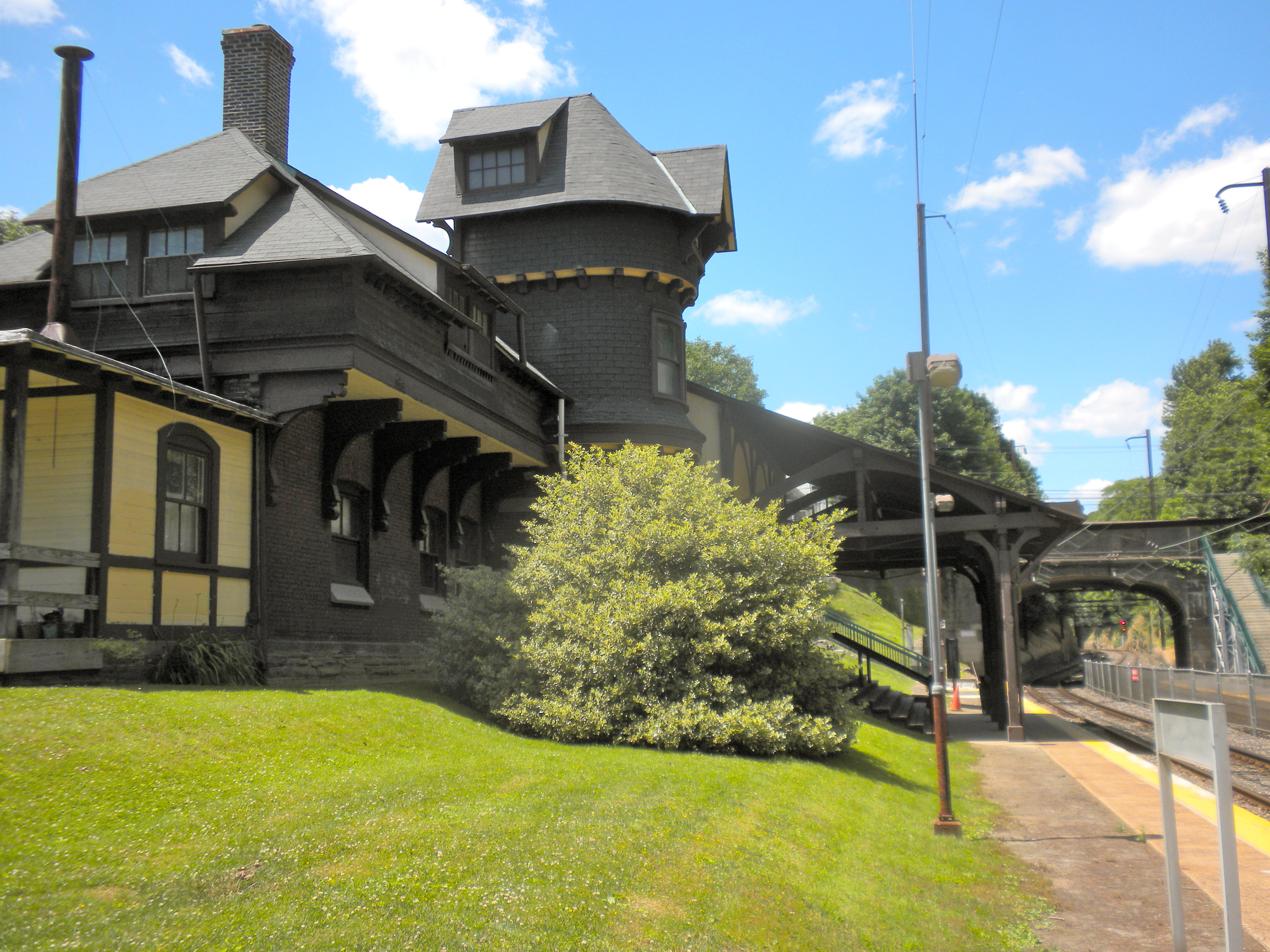

General information
- Location: 300 East Gravers Lane at Anderson Street; Philadelphia, Pennsylvania, U.S.
- Owner: SEPTA
- Line: Chestnut Hill East Branch
- Platforms: 2 side platforms
- Tracks: 2
- Connections: SEPTA City Bus: 51

Construction
- Parking: 17
- Accessible: No

Other information
- Fare zone: 2

History
- Opened: 1879
- Electrified: February 5, 1933

Services
| Preceding station | SEPTA | Following station |
|---|---|---|
| Chestnut Hill East Terminus | Chestnut Hill East Line | Wyndmoor toward 30th Street Station |
Former services
| Preceding station | Reading Railroad | Following station |
|---|---|---|
| Chestnut Hill Terminus | Chestnut Hill Branch | Wyndmoor toward Philadelphia |
- Graver's Lane Station
- U.S. National Register of Historic Places
- Philadelphia Register of Historic Places
- Interactive map of Graver's Lane Station
- Location: Gravers Lane and Reading Railroad Line; Philadelphia, Pennsylvania, U.S.
- Coordinates: 40°4′37.75″N 75°12′8.73″W
- Built: 1879
- Architect: Frank Furness
- Architectural style: Late Gothic Revival
- NRHP reference No.: 77001184
- Added to NRHP: November 07, 1977
Location

Gravers station (formerly Graver's Lane station) is a SEPTA Regional Rail station, which is located at 300 East Gravers Lane at Anderson Street, Philadelphia, Pennsylvania. The station building is listed on the Philadelphia Register of Historic Places and the National Register.

== History and architectural features ==
Designed by architect Furness & Evans, Gravers station was built in 1872 or 1879, according to the Philadelphia Architects and Buildings project. It was listed on the National Register of Historic Places on November 7, 1977, and was acquired by SEPTA's regional rail division in 1983.

The building combines a commuter railroad station with a residence on the second floor, and includes a range of materials and stylistic features, leading one architectural historian to call the style "histrionic."

The station is located in zone two on the Chestnut Hill East Line, along former Reading Railroad tracks, and is 10.3 track miles from Suburban Station. In 2013, this station saw 124 boardings and 125 departures on an average weekday.
