= Sedgwick station (SEPTA) =

SEPTA train station in Philadelphia, Pennsylvania, United States

Sedgwick
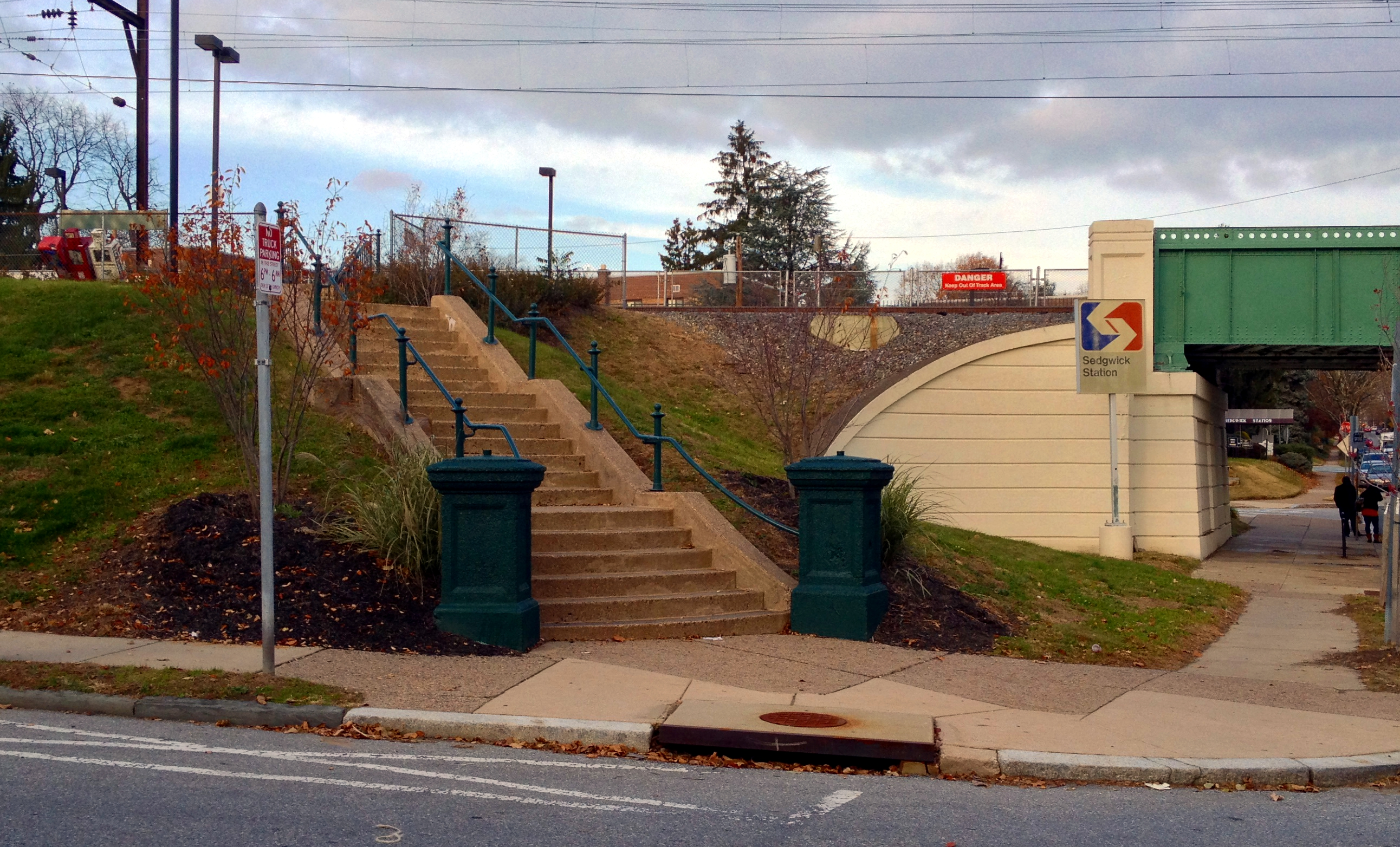
- Entrance to Sedgwick station from Mount Pleasant Avenue

General information
- Location: 253 East Mount Pleasant Avenue between Sprague and Devon Streets, Philadelphia, Pennsylvania, U.S.
- Coordinates: 40.0627°N 75.1849°W
- Owner: SEPTA
- Line: Chestnut Hill East Branch
- Platforms: 2 side platforms
- Tracks: 2
- Connections: SEPTA City Bus: 71

Construction
- Parking: 20 spaces
- Accessible: No

Other information
- Fare zone: 2

History
- Electrified: February 5, 1933

Services
Preceding station	SEPTA	Following station
Mount Airy toward Chestnut Hill East	Chestnut Hill East Line	Stenton toward 30th Street Station
Former services
Preceding station	Reading Railroad	Following station
Mount Airy toward Chestnut Hill	Chestnut Hill Branch	Gorgas toward Philadelphia
Location

Sedgwick station is a SEPTA Regional Rail station at 253 East Mount Pleasant Avenue between Sprague and Devon Streets in Philadelphia, Pennsylvania. The old station building was built in 1882 with Furness & Evans as the architect, but was damaged in an arson fire around 1980 and demolished. The current station facility consists of low level platforms with open shelters. A walkway under the tracks was sealed off due to criminal activity.

The station is in zone 2 on the Chestnut Hill East Line, on former Reading Railroad tracks, and is 8.9 track miles from Suburban Station. In 2013, this station saw 225 boardings and 279 alightings on an average weekday.
