= Chestnut Hill East Line =

SEPTA Regional Rail service

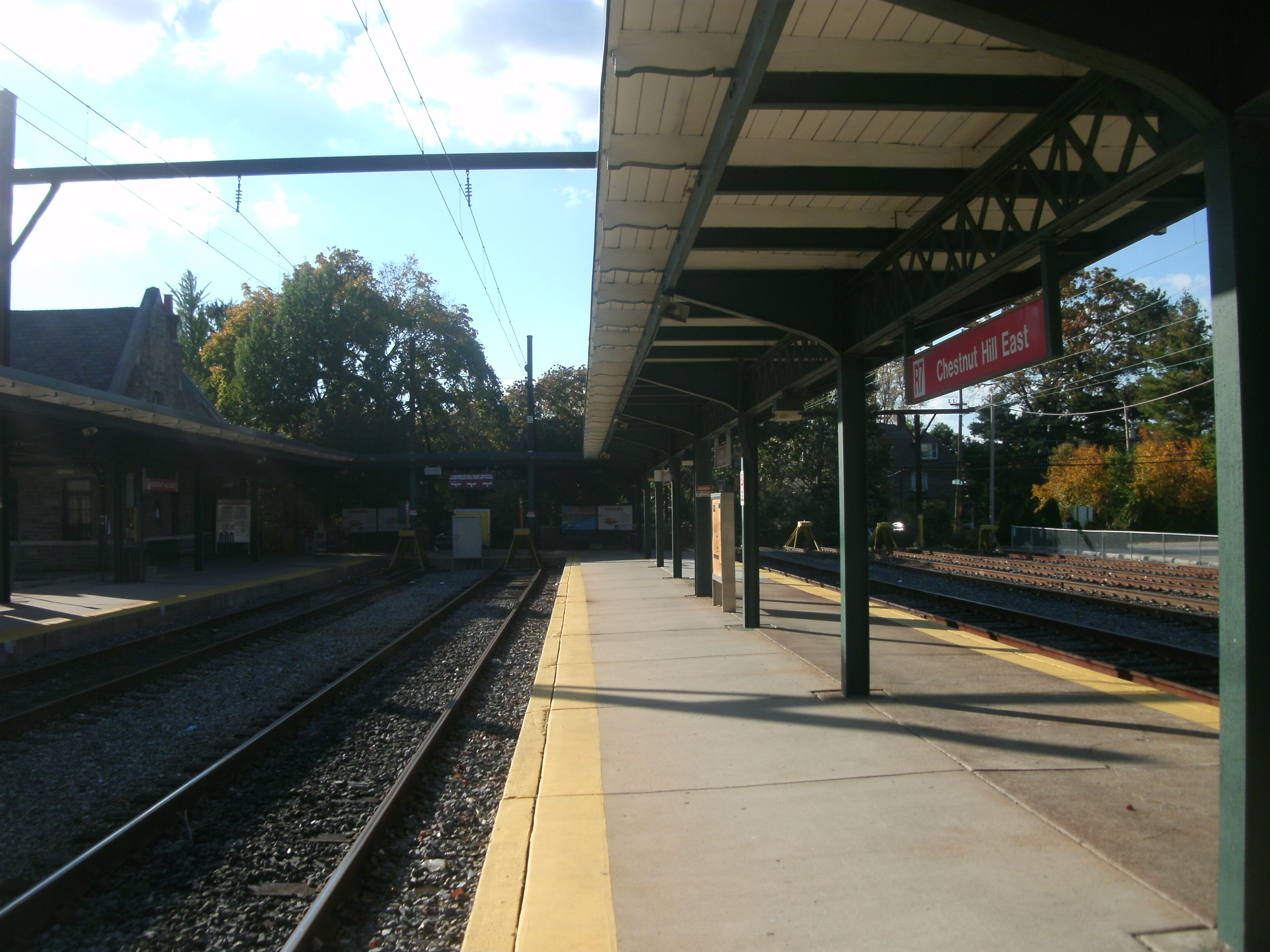
- The Chestnut Hill East station as seen in October 2012. The station depot, constructed by the Reading Company, is visible on the left.

Overview
- Service type: SEPTA Regional Rail commuter service
- Current operator: SEPTA
- Ridership: 3,365 (FY 2025 daily)

Route
- Termini: Chestnut Hill East; 30th Street Station; Penn Medicine Station (weekends and major holidays)
- Stops: 15
- Distance travelled: 10.8 mi (17.4 km)
- Lines used: Chestnut Hill East Branch; SEPTA Main Line

Technical
- Rolling stock: Electric multiple units
- Electrification: Overhead line, 12 kV 25 Hz AC

The Chestnut Hill East Line is a route of the SEPTA Regional Rail (commuter rail) system. The route serves the northwestern section of Philadelphia with service to Germantown, Mount Airy, and Chestnut Hill. It is one of two lines that serve Chestnut Hill, the other one being the Chestnut Hill West Line. The line is fully grade-separated.

== History ==

The Chestnut Hill East Line is a continuation of the Reading Company's suburban services on the Chestnut Hill East Branch from Philadelphia to Germantown and Chestnut Hill. The oldest part of the line that became the Chestnut Hill East Branch was opened in 1832 by the Philadelphia, Germantown and Norristown Railroad, and later became part of the Reading system. Electrified service began on February 5, 1933.

Until 1984 Chestnut Hill East trains used the Reading Viaduct to reach Spring Garden Street and the Reading Terminal; this ended with the opening of the Center City Commuter Connection which routed the trains through the city center and on the ex-Pennsylvania Railroad part of the system. From this point the route was designated R7 Chestnut Hill East as part of SEPTA's diametrical reorganization of its lines; trains continued on to the Trenton Line. The R-number naming system was dropped on July 25, 2010. As of 2026, most weekday Chestnut Hill East Line trains continue through Center City to the Airport Line, while weekend trains continue to the Wilmington/Newark Line.

SEPTA activated positive train control on the Chestnut Hill East Line on July 25, 2016.

On April 9, 2020, service on the line was suspended due to the COVID-19 pandemic, though Temple University and Wayne Junction stations were still being served by other rail services. Service resumed on June 28, 2020.

== Stations ==
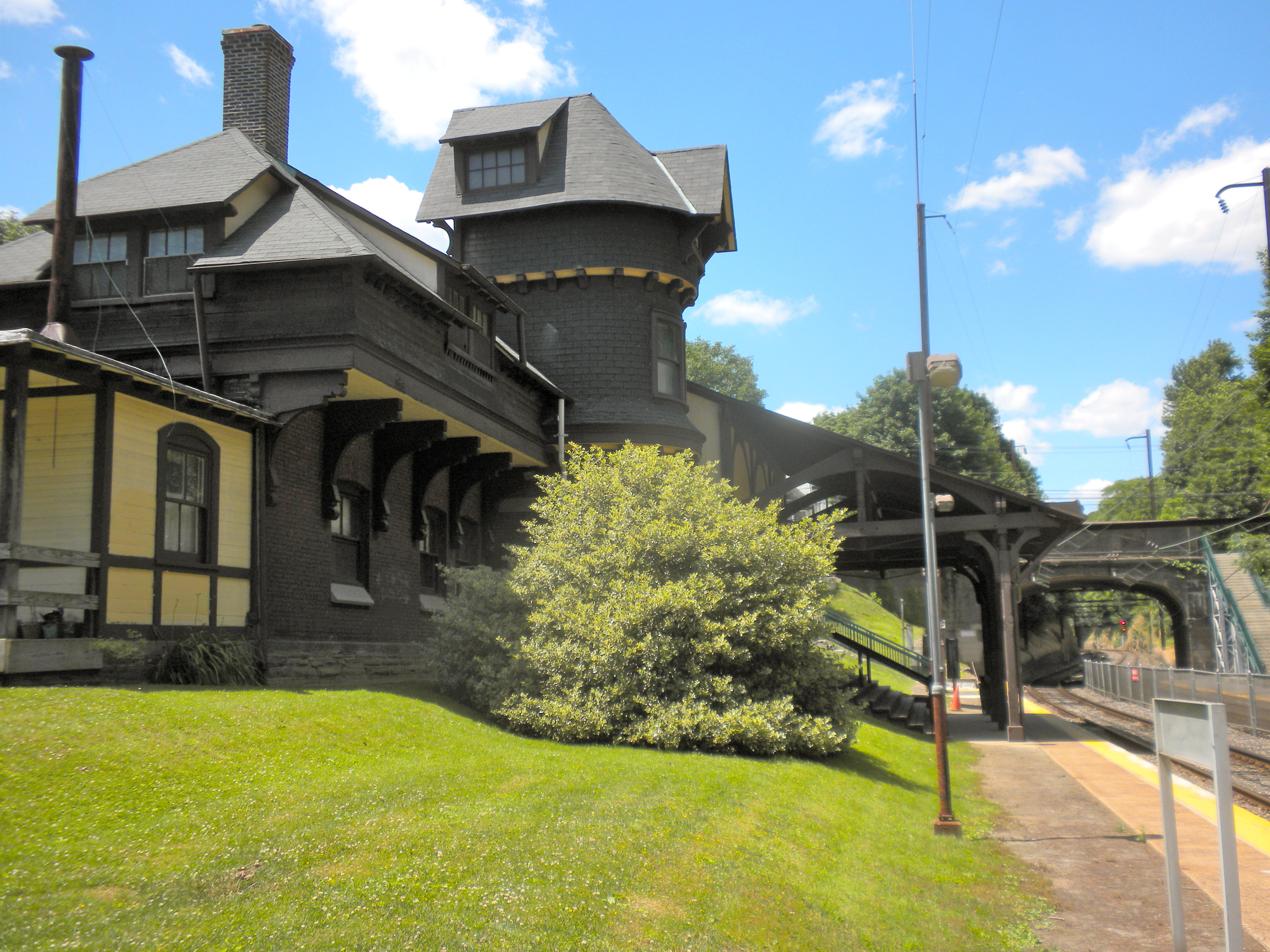
The Reading Company opened Gravers in 1879

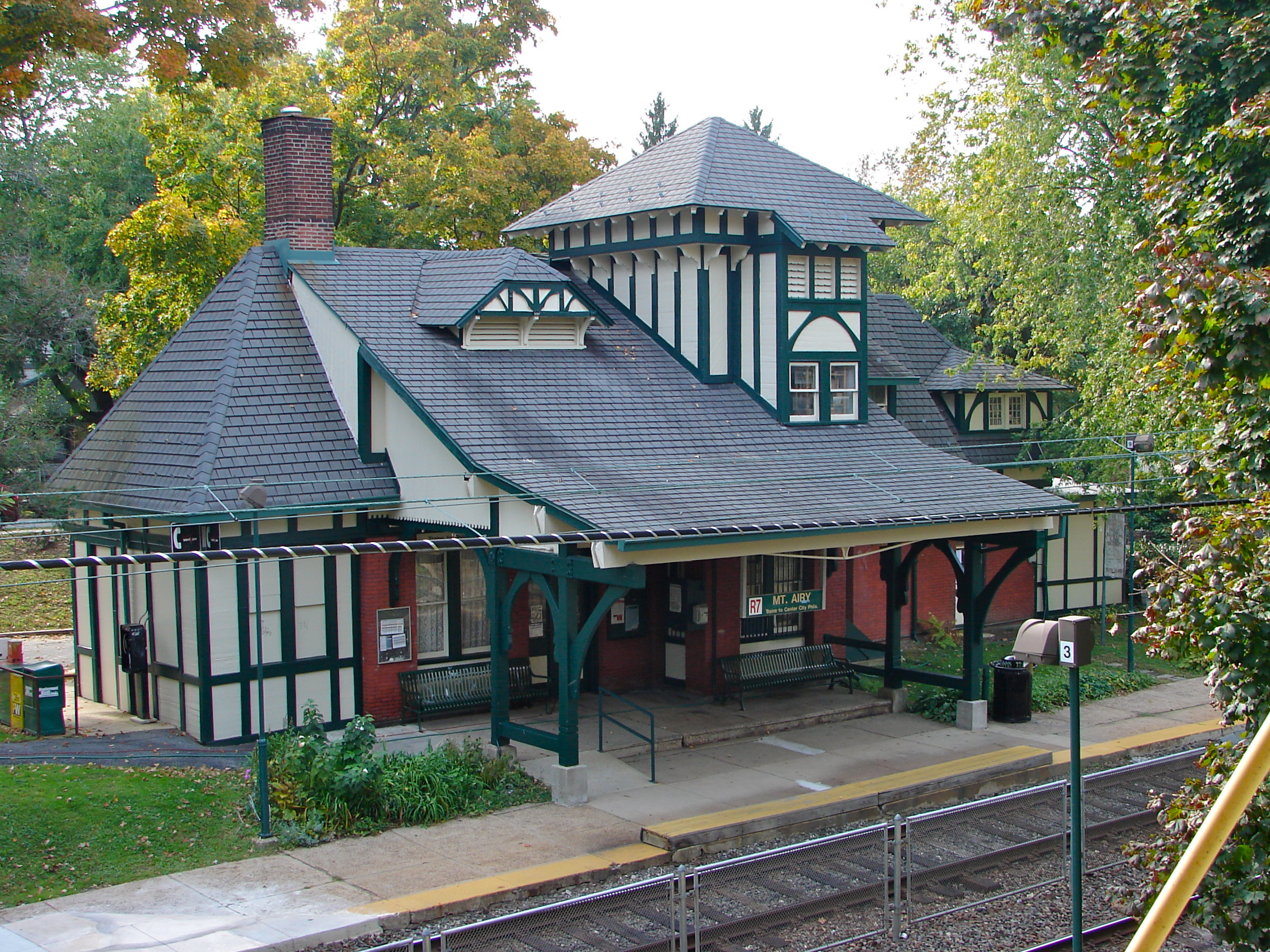
Mount Airy, like Gravers, was designed by Frank Furness

The Chestnut Hill East line makes the following station stops after leaving the Center City Commuter Connection; stations indicated with a gray background are closed. All stations are located within the city of Philadelphia.

Zone	Location	Station	Miles (km) from Center City	Connections / notes
C	Temple University	Temple University	2.1 (3.4)	SEPTA Regional Rail: all lines; SEPTA City Bus: 3, 23, 47
C	Nicetown–Tioga			
C	Nicetown–Tioga	Tioga		Closed 1989
C	Nicetown–Tioga	Nicetown		Closed November 14, 1988 due to fire damage
1	Nicetown–Tioga	Wayne Junction	5.1 (8.2)	SEPTA Regional Rail: SEPTA City Bus: 2, 23, 53, 75
1	Wister			
1	Wister	Fishers	5.7 (9.2)	Closed October 4, 1992
1	Wister	Wister	6.1 (9.8)	SEPTA City Bus: 41
1	East Germantown			
1	East Germantown	Wingohocking	6.5 (10.5)	
1	East Germantown	Germantown	6.8 (10.9)	SEPTA City Bus: 26, 41, K
2	East Germantown	Walnut Lane	7.7 (12.4)	
2	East Germantown	Washington Lane	7.8 (12.6)	SEPTA City Bus: 81
2	East Mount Airy	Stenton	8.6 (13.8)	SEPTA City Bus: 18
2	East Mount Airy	Gorgas	8.7 (14.0)	
2	East Mount Airy	Sedgwick	8.9 (14.3)	SEPTA City Bus: 71
2	East Mount Airy	Mount Airy	9.3 (15.0)	
2	Chestnut Hill			
2	Chestnut Hill	Mermaid	9.8 (15.8)	
2	Chestnut Hill	Wyndmoor	10.0 (16.1)	SEPTA City Bus: 77
2	Chestnut Hill	Gravers	10.3 (16.6)	SEPTA City Bus: 51
2	Chestnut Hill	Chestnut Hill East	10.8 (17.4)	SEPTA Regional Rail: (at Chestnut Hill West); SEPTA City Bus: 51; SEPTA Suburban Bus: 94

== Ridership ==
Yearly ridership on the Chestnut Hill East Line between FY 2013–FY 2018 was steady around 1.4–1.6 million. Ridership declined in FY 2019 and then collapsed during the COVID-19 pandemic. (Note: Data for individual lines is not available for FY 2020. Ridership in FY 2025 was 982,313; still below FY 2019.)
