= Chestnut Hill East station =

SEPTA Regional Rail station

Chestnut Hill East
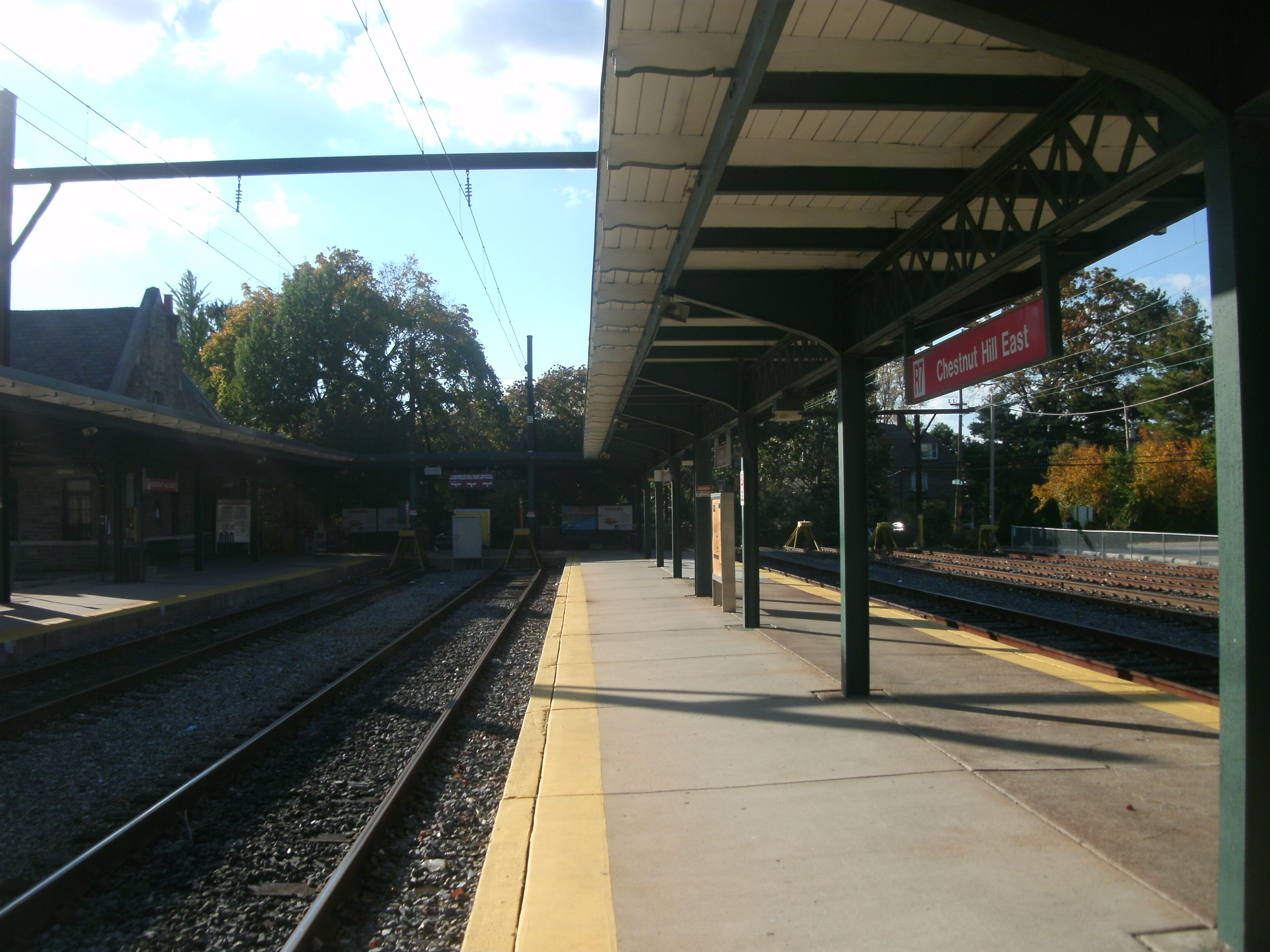
- The Chestnut Hill East station as seen in October 2012. The station depot, constructed by the Reading Company, is visible on the left.

General information
- Location: 100 East Chestnut Hill Avenue, Philadelphia, Pennsylvania, U.S.
- Coordinates: 40.0810°N 75.2079°W
- Owner: SEPTA
- Line: Chestnut Hill East Branch
- Platforms: 1 side platform, 1 island platform
- Tracks: 6
- Connections: Chestnut Hill West Line Chestnut Hill West station SEPTA City Bus: 51; SEPTA Suburban Bus: 94, 97

Construction
- Parking: 104 spaces
- Accessible: No

Other information
- Fare zone: 2

History
- Opened: December 1, 1854
- Rebuilt: 1931
- Electrified: February 5, 1933
- Former names: Chestnut Hill (December 1, 1854–April 1, 1977)

Key dates
- June 1931: Station depot demolished

Services
Preceding station	SEPTA	Following station
Terminus	Chestnut Hill East Line	Gravers toward 30th Street Station
Former services
Preceding station	Reading Railroad	Following station
Terminus	Chestnut Hill Branch	Gravers toward Philadelphia
Location

Chestnut Hill East station is a SEPTA Regional Rail station in Philadelphia, Pennsylvania, United States. Located at 102–04 Bethlehem Pike at Chestnut Hill Avenue, it serves the Chestnut Hill East Line. The current station building was built in 1931 by the Reading Railroad, as a replacement for an earlier station that existed between 1872 and 1930.

The station is in zone 2 on the Chestnut Hill East Line, on former Reading Railroad tracks, and is 10.8 track miles from Suburban Station. In 2013, this station saw 433 boardings and 479 alightings on an average weekday. Chestnut Hill East is often confused with Chestnut Hill West, which is a SEPTA station a few minutes away from Chestnut Hill East's location. Boarding statistics, however, show greater usage of this line than of the Chestnut Hill West Line by Chestnut Hill residents.

Prior to rebuilding and electrification circa 1931, the stub terminal had three short passenger car tracks serviced by two platforms, a small engine terminal with a turntable, five-stall roundhouse and water tank, plus a few freight tracks serving storage buildings and a coal and lumber business.

== Bibliography ==
- Alexander, Edwin P. (1940). Model Railroads: Planning Construction Operation. New York, New York: W. W. Norton & Company.
- Hosking, George (1913). Moody's Manual of Railroads and Corporation Securities: Volume I Fourteenth Annual Number 1913. New York, New York: Moody Manual Company.
