= Chestnut Hill East Branch =

Railway line in Pennsylvania

Overview
- Owner: SEPTA

Service
- Services: Chestnut Hill East Line

History
- Opened: 6 June 1832

Technical
- Line length: 5.8 mi (9.3 km)
- Track gauge: 1,435 mm (4 ft 8 1/2 in) standard gauge
- Electrification: 12 kV 25 Hz overhead catenary

The Chestnut Hill East Branch is a railway line in Pennsylvania. It runs 5.5 miles (8.9 km) from a junction with the SEPTA Main Line in Nicetown–Tioga, a neighborhood in Philadelphia, to Chestnut Hill, Philadelphia. The oldest part of it was built in 1832 by the Philadelphia, Germantown and Norristown Railroad. It was part of the Reading Company system from 1870 until 1976. Today it is owned by SEPTA and hosts the Chestnut Hill East Line commuter rail service. The line runs roughly parallel to the Chestnut Hill West Branch, formerly of the Pennsylvania Railroad.

== History ==
The Philadelphia, Germantown and Norristown Railroad's initial line ran from Ninth and Green in Philadelphia to Germantown. This 6-mile (9.7 km) line opened on June 6, 1832. Plans to build north from Germantown to Norristown were abandoned in favor a different route that branched off the existing line at what is now 16th Street Junction. Germantown remained the northernmost station on the branch until 1854 when the Chestnut Hill Railroad, leased by the Philadelphia, Germantown and Norristown Railroad, extended the line 4 miles (6.4 km) to Chestnut Hill. This extension opened on December 1, 1854.

The Philadelphia and Reading Railroad, a forerunner of the Reading Company, leased the Philadelphia, Germantown and Norristown Railroad on December 1, 1870. In 1879, the Reading built the Tabor Branch to link the former PG&N line with the North Pennsylvania Railroad's main line, thus making the former PG&N line south of Wayne Junction the Reading's primary passenger route into Philadelphia.

The Reading continued to run regular commuter service on what it called variously the Germantown and Chestnut Hill Branch or simply the Chestnut Hill Branch. The Reading electrified the branch on February 5, 1933. The Philadelphia, Germantown and Norristown Railroad continued to exist on paper, owning that part of the branch between Wayne and Germantown, but the Chestnut Hill Railroad was merged into the Reading in 1948. With the Reading Company's final bankruptcy in 1976, the Chestnut Hill Branch was conveyed to Conrail and then SEPTA. SEPTA activated positive train control on the Chestnut Hill East Branch on July 25, 2016.
