= Upsal station =

SEPTA train station in Philadelphia, Pennsylvania, United States

Coordinates: 40.0424°N 75.1900°W

Upsal
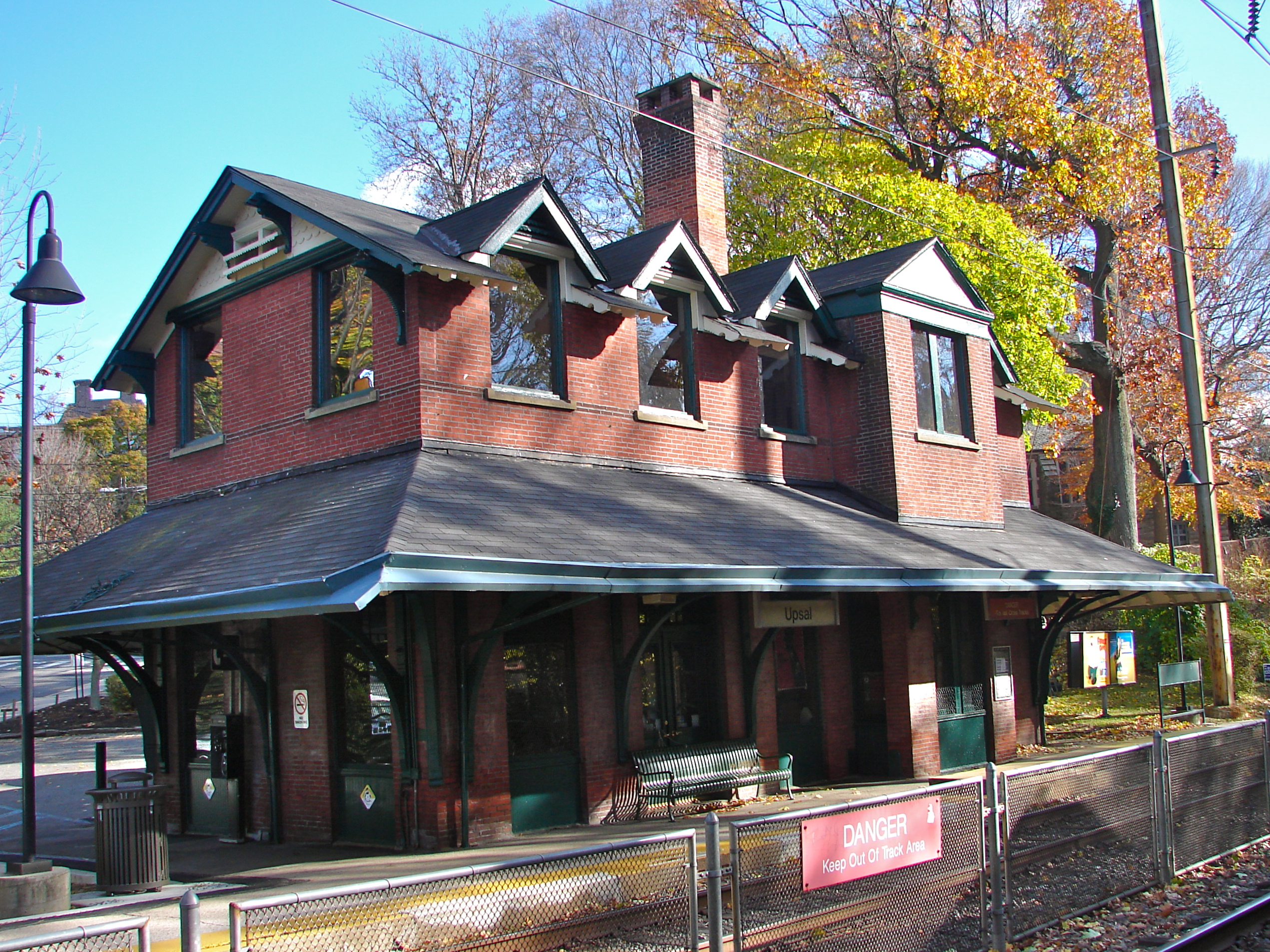

General information
- Location: 6460 Greene Street (Greene and Upsal Streets); Philadelphia, Pennsylvania
- Owner: SEPTA
- Line: Chestnut Hill West Branch
- Platforms: 2 side platforms
- Tracks: 2
- Connections: SEPTA City Bus: 71

Construction
- Parking: 7 spaces
- Accessible: No

Other information
- Fare zone: 2

History
- Electrified: March 22, 1918; 108 years ago

Passengers
- 2017: 356 boardings 305 alightings (weekday average)
- Rank: 77 of 146

Services
Preceding station	SEPTA	Following station
Carpenter toward Chestnut Hill West	Chestnut Hill West Line	Tulpehocken toward Temple University
Former services
Preceding station	Pennsylvania Railroad	Following station
Carpenter toward Chestnut Hill	Chestnut Hill Line	Tulpehocken toward Suburban Station
Carpenter toward White Marsh	Fort Washington Branch	Tulpehocken toward Suburban Station
Location

Upsal station is a SEPTA Regional Rail station in Philadelphia, Pennsylvania. Located at 6460 Greene Street, it serves the Chestnut Hill West Line.

The former station house, which was originally built by the Pennsylvania Railroad, was a café and restaurant in the 2010s. The station is 9.1 track miles from Suburban Station. In 2017 it saw 356 boardings and 305 alightings on an average weekday.
