= Carpenter station =

SEPTA train station in Philadelphia, Pennsylvania, United States

Coordinates: 40.0509°N 75.1917°W

Carpenter
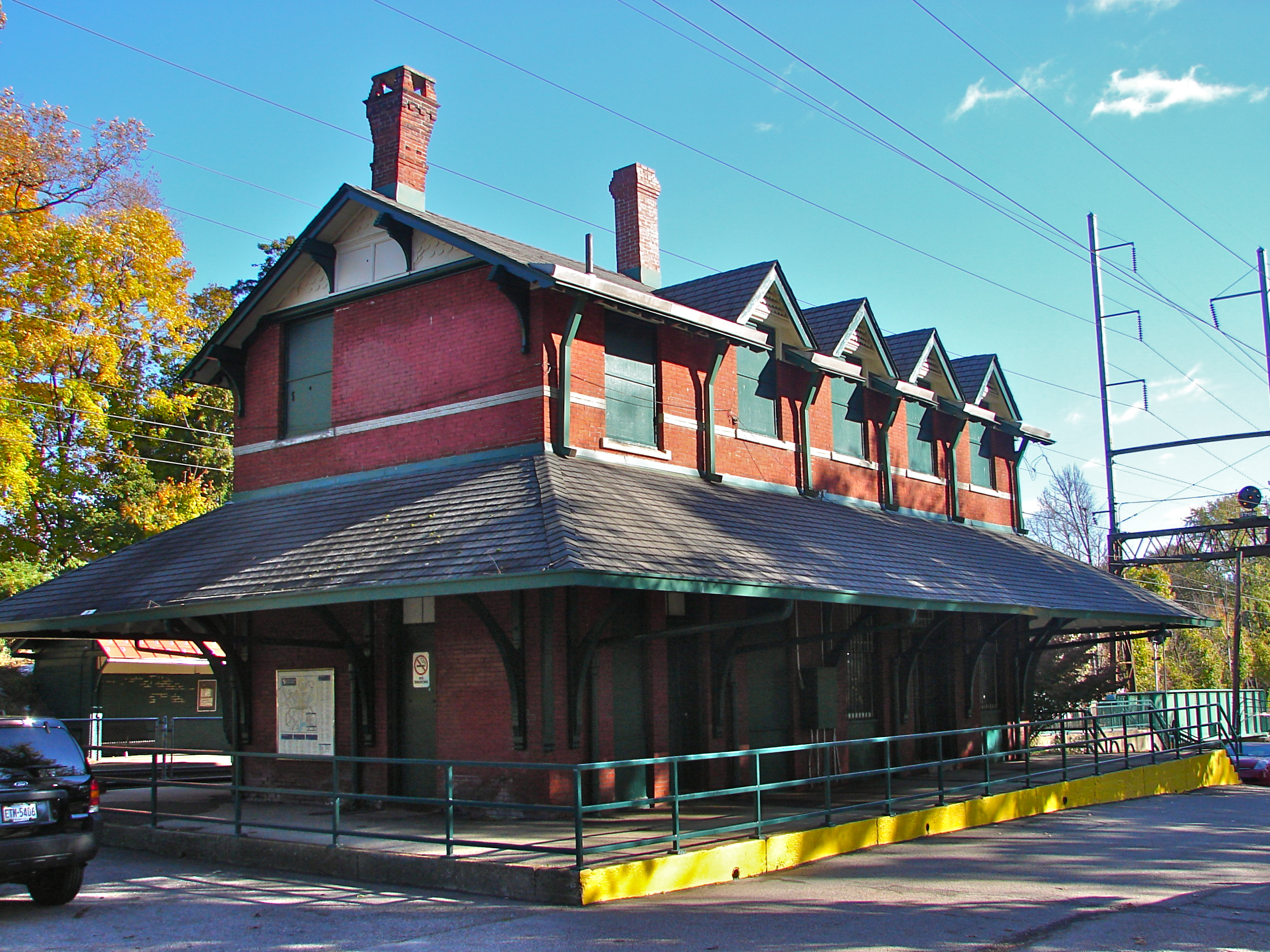

General information
- Location: 201 West Carpenter Lane; Philadelphia, Pennsylvania, U.S.
- Owner: SEPTA
- Line: Chestnut Hill West Branch
- Platforms: 2 side platforms
- Tracks: 2
- Connections: SEPTA City Bus: 53

Construction
- Platform levels: 1
- Parking: 93 spaces
- Accessible: No

Other information
- Fare zone: 2

History
- Opened: June 11, 1884; 142 years ago
- Electrified: March 22, 1918; 108 years ago
- Former names: Carpenter Lane

Passengers
- 2017: 342 boardings 342 alightings (weekday average)
- Rank: 80 of 146

Services
Preceding station	SEPTA	Following station
Richard Allen Lane toward Chestnut Hill West	Chestnut Hill West Line	Upsal toward Temple University
Former services
Preceding station	Pennsylvania Railroad	Following station
Allen Lane toward Chestnut Hill	Chestnut Hill Line	Upsal toward Suburban Station
Allen Lane toward White Marsh	Fort Washington Branch	Upsal toward Suburban Station

Philadelphia Register of Historic Places
- Designated: August 6, 1981
Location

Carpenter station is a SEPTA Regional Rail station in Philadelphia, Pennsylvania. Located at 201 Carpenter Lane, it serves the Chestnut Hill West Line.

The historic station building has been listed in the Philadelphia Register of Historic Places since August 6, 1981. It is in zone 2 on the Chestnut Hill West Line, on former Pennsylvania Railroad tracks, and is 9.8 track miles from Suburban Station. In fiscal 2012, this station saw 371 boardings on an average weekday. This station is also served by Route 53, which got extended here in the 1st Phase of the New Bus Network.
