= St. Martins station =

SEPTA train station in Philadelphia, Pennsylvania, United States

Coordinates: 40.0658°N 75.2046°W

St. Martins
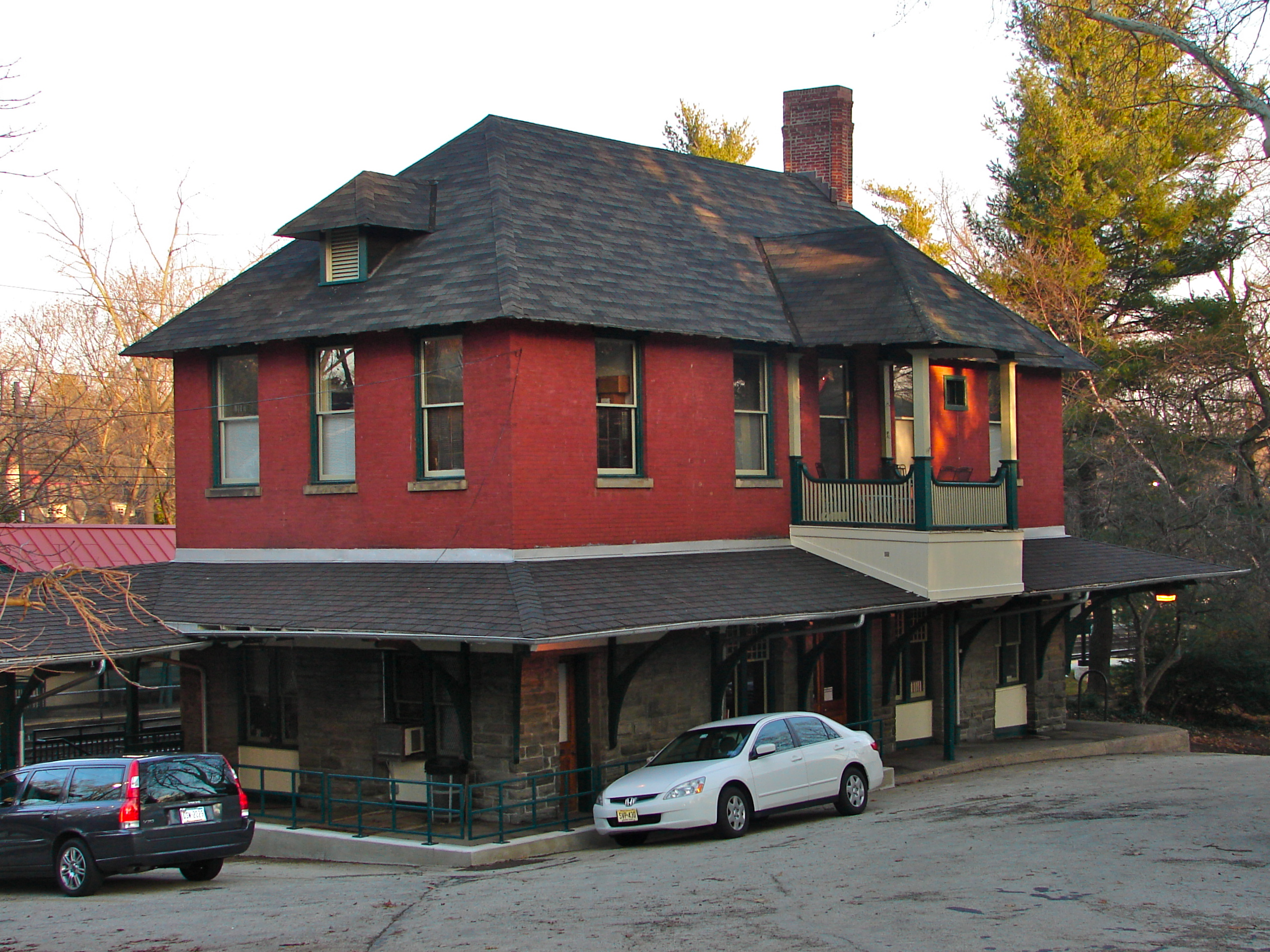

General information
- Location: 7915 St. Martins Lane; Philadelphia, Pennsylvania, 19118
- Owner: SEPTA
- Line: Chestnut Hill West Branch
- Platforms: 2 side platforms
- Tracks: 2

Construction
- Parking: 76 spaces
- Accessible: No

Other information
- Fare zone: 2

History
- Opened: June 11, 1884; 142 years ago
- Electrified: March 22, 1918; 108 years ago
- Former names: Wissahickon Heights (June 11, 1884–January 1, 1906)

Services
Preceding station	SEPTA	Following station
Highland toward Chestnut Hill West	Chestnut Hill West Line	Richard Allen Lane toward Temple University
Former services
Preceding station	Pennsylvania Railroad	Following station
Highland toward Chestnut Hill	Chestnut Hill Line	Allen Lane toward Suburban Station
Location

Saint Martins station is a SEPTA Regional Rail station in Philadelphia, Pennsylvania. Located at 311 West Springfield Avenue near the intersection of West Willow Grove and Seminole Avenues, it serves the Chestnut Hill West Line. The station was built by the Pennsylvania Railroad in 1883 and was known as Wissahickon Heights until 1906. The station and adjoining St Martins/St Martin's Lane take their present name from the Church of Saint Martin in the Fields, which stands a few hundred feet to the west.

The station is in zone 2 on the Chestnut Hill West Line and is 10.9 track miles from Suburban Station. In 2004, this station saw 215 boardings on an average weekday. It serves numerous Springside Chestnut Hill Academy students daily. It is also a contributing property of the Chestnut Hill Historic District.

The bridge that carried Willow Grove Avenue over the tracks was under repair from the fall of 2005 to late summer of 2006, and had a 3-ton weight limit. The bridge was replaced in the summer of 2016.
