= Carpenter's Station =

Carpenter's Station may refer to the following communities:

- Carpenter's Station, Alabama
- Carpenter's Station, Kentucky
- Carpenter's Station, Louisiana
- Carpenter's Station, Tennessee
- Long Island, Alabama, also known as Carpenters Station

== See also ==
- Carpenter station, a railroad station in Philadelphia, Pennsylvania
