= Highland station (SEPTA) =

SEPTA train station in Chestnut Hill, Philadelphia, Pennsylvania, United States

Coordinates: 40.0705°N 75.2112°W

Highland
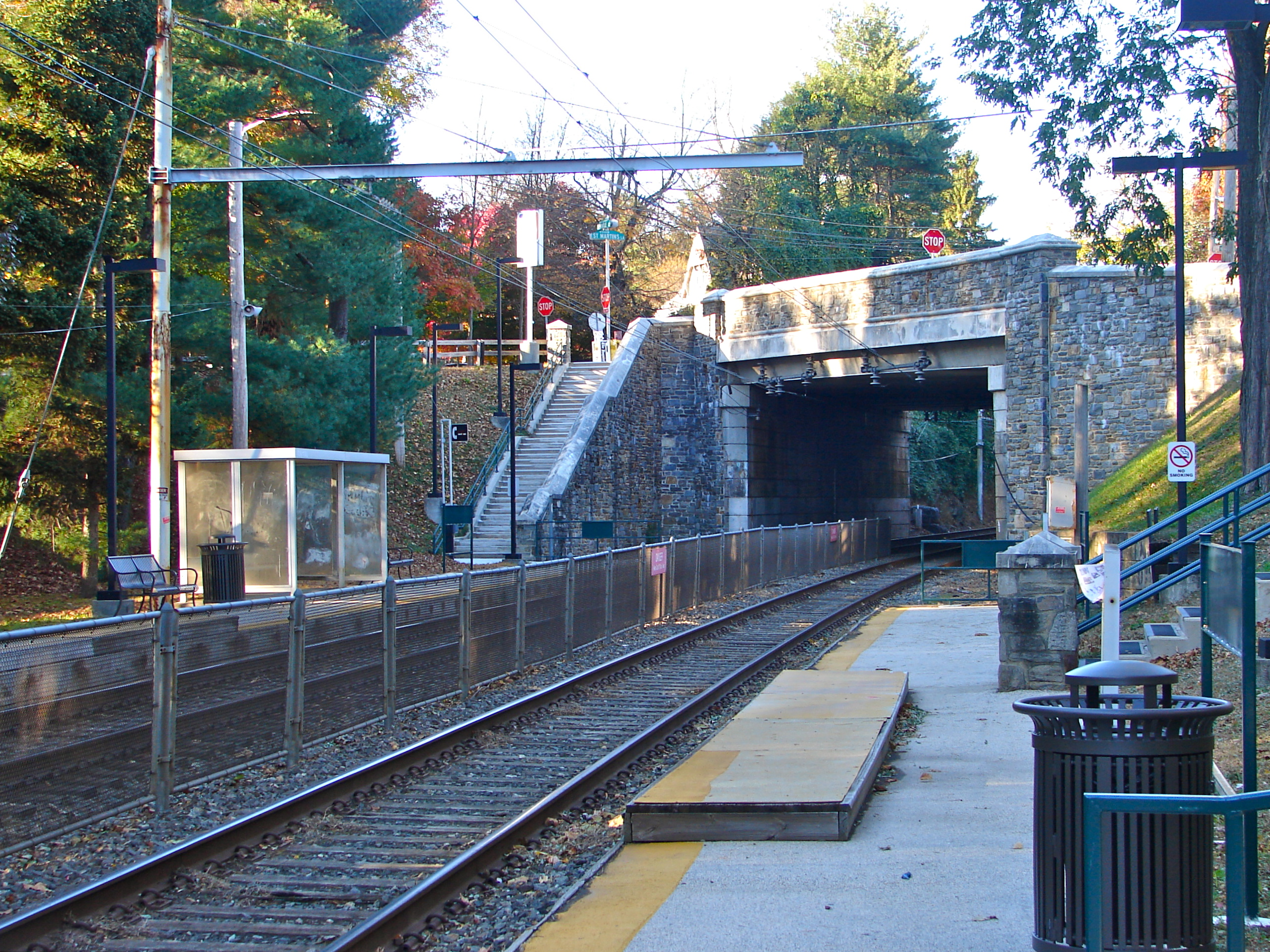

General information
- Location: 8412 Seminole Street and Highland Avenue; Philadelphia, Pennsylvania
- Owner: SEPTA
- Line: Chestnut Hill West Branch
- Platforms: 2 side platforms
- Tracks: 2

Construction
- Platform levels: 1
- Parking: 61 spaces
- Accessible: No

Other information
- Fare zone: 2

History
- Opened: June 11, 1884; 142 years ago
- Electrified: March 22, 1918; 108 years ago

Services
Preceding station	SEPTA	Following station
Chestnut Hill West Terminus	Chestnut Hill West Line	St. Martins toward Temple University
Former services
Preceding station	Pennsylvania Railroad	Following station
Chestnut Hill Terminus	Chestnut Hill Line	St. Martins toward Suburban Station
Location

Highland station is a SEPTA Regional Rail station in Philadelphia, Pennsylvania. Located at 8412 Seminole Avenue at Highland Avenue in the Chestnut Hill neighborhood, it serves the Chestnut Hill West Line. The Pennsylvania Railroad initiated service on June 11, 1884.

The station is in zone 2 on the Chestnut Hill West Line, on former Pennsylvania Railroad tracks, and is 10.7 track miles from Suburban Station. In 2004, this station saw 32 boardings on an average weekday. More recently, usage appears to have doubled, but there is still considerable unused free parking in the Philadelphia Parking Authority lot (outbound side) and on the adjacent streets. The only shelter is a small Plexiglas hut on the inbound side.
