= Germantown and Chestnut Hill Branch =

The Germantown and Chestnut Hill Branch could refer to two railway lines in Philadelphia:

- the Chestnut Hill East Branch
- the Chestnut Hill West Branch
