= Richard Allen Lane station =

SEPTA train station in Mount Airy, Philadelphia, Pennsylvania, United States

Richard Allen Lane
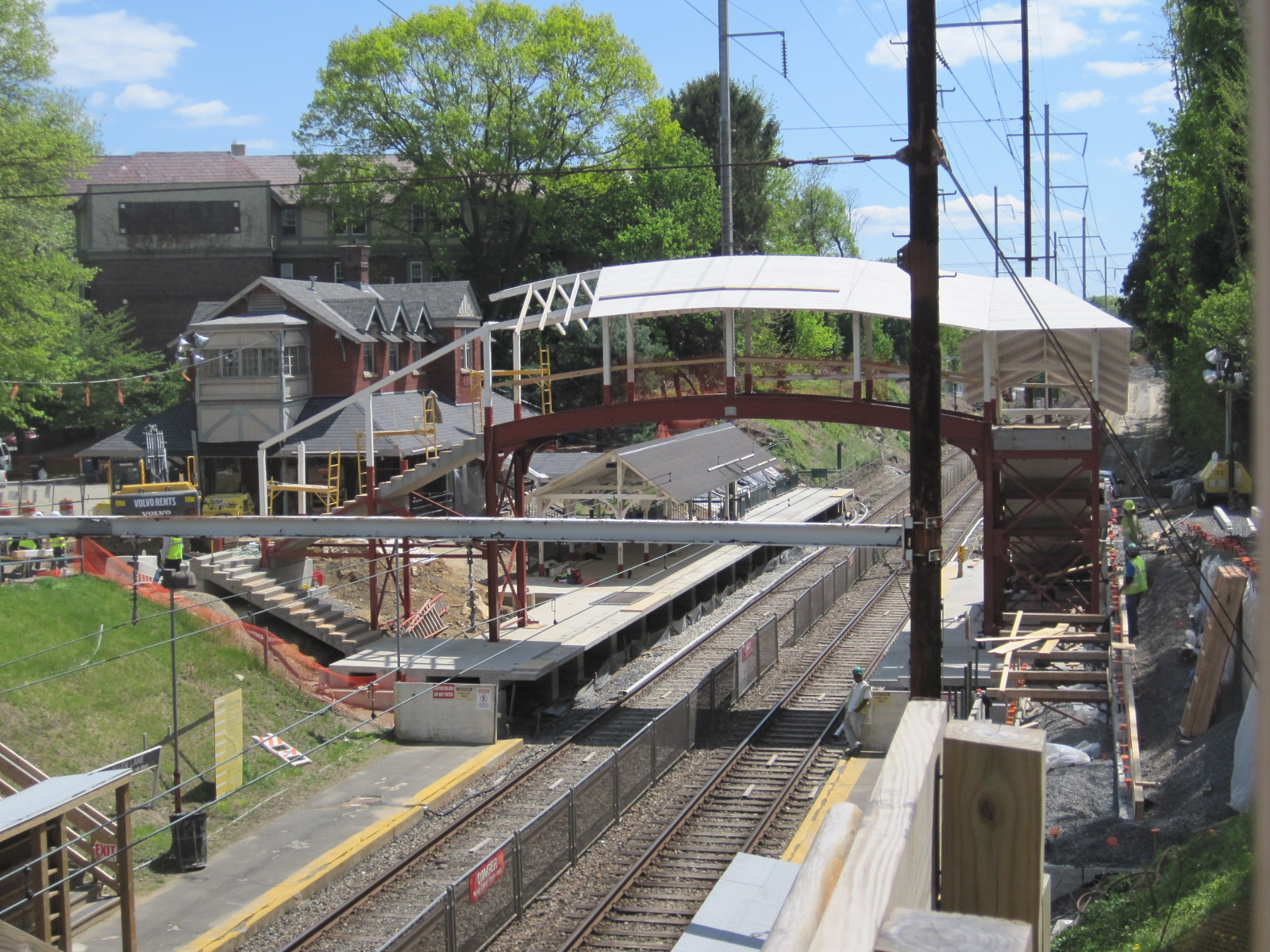
- Allen Lane station during construction of the high-level platforms

General information
- Location: 200 West Allens Lane; Mount Airy, Philadelphia, Pennsylvania, U.S.
- Coordinates: 40.0575°N 75.1950°W
- Owner: SEPTA
- Line: Chestnut Hill West Branch
- Platforms: 2 side platforms
- Tracks: 2

Construction
- Platform levels: 1
- Parking: 6 spaces
- Accessible: Yes

Other information
- Fare zone: 2

History
- Opened: 1880; 146 years ago
- Electrified: March 22, 1918; 108 years ago
- Former names: Allen Lane (1880–2022)

Passengers
- 2017: 310 boardings 307 alightings (weekday average)
- Rank: 87 of 146

Services
Preceding station	SEPTA	Following station
St. Martins toward Chestnut Hill West	Chestnut Hill West Line	Carpenter toward Temple University
Former services
Preceding station	Pennsylvania Railroad	Following station
St. Martins toward Chestnut Hill	Chestnut Hill Line	Carpenter toward Suburban Station
Germantown Road toward White Marsh	Fort Washington Branch	Carpenter toward Suburban Station
Location

Richard Allen Lane station (formerly Allen Lane station) is a SEPTA Regional Rail station in Philadelphia. It is located at 200 West Allens Lane in the Mount Airy neighborhood and serves the Chestnut Hill West Line. The station building was built circa 1880. Like many in Philadelphia, it retains much of its Victorian/Edwardian appearance.

The former station building now houses a coffee shop, the High Point Cafe.

The station is in zone 2 on the Chestnut Hill West Line, on former Pennsylvania Railroad tracks, and is 10.1 track miles from Suburban Station. In fiscal 2012, this station saw 307 boardings on an average weekday.

== Naming ==
Allen Lane station got its name from the adjoining street, Allens Lane, which was named for William Allen, a prominent man of the colonial-era Province of Pennsylvania. His estate, Mount Airy, is the source of the surrounding neighborhood's name; it was at the top of the hill where Allens Lane meets Germantown Avenue. The site is now the campus of the Lutheran Theological Seminary at Philadelphia.

Since at least the 19th century, there has been variation in the lane's name between "Allen", "Allen's", and "Allens". Today, through maps and signage, the names have reached a level of written codification that leaves the lane's name written consistently as "Allens" and the station's name written consistently as "Allen". Colloquially, the Allen/Allen's/Allens variation persists in local speech, such as when train conductors sometimes announce the stop as "Allen's Lane". The "Allen Lane" variation that became the codified station name may have been reinforced by a timetable printer's error—the Pennsylvania Railroad's timetables were printed by the firm of Allen, Lane & Scott.

On February 14, 2022, Allens Lane was re-attributed to Richard Allen, (1760–1831, a minister, educator, writer, and one of America's most active and influential Black leaders) by resolution of the Philadelphia city council, facilitated by the efforts of State Rep. Chris Rabb. The station was renamed to Richard Allen Lane station.

== Restoration and renovation ==
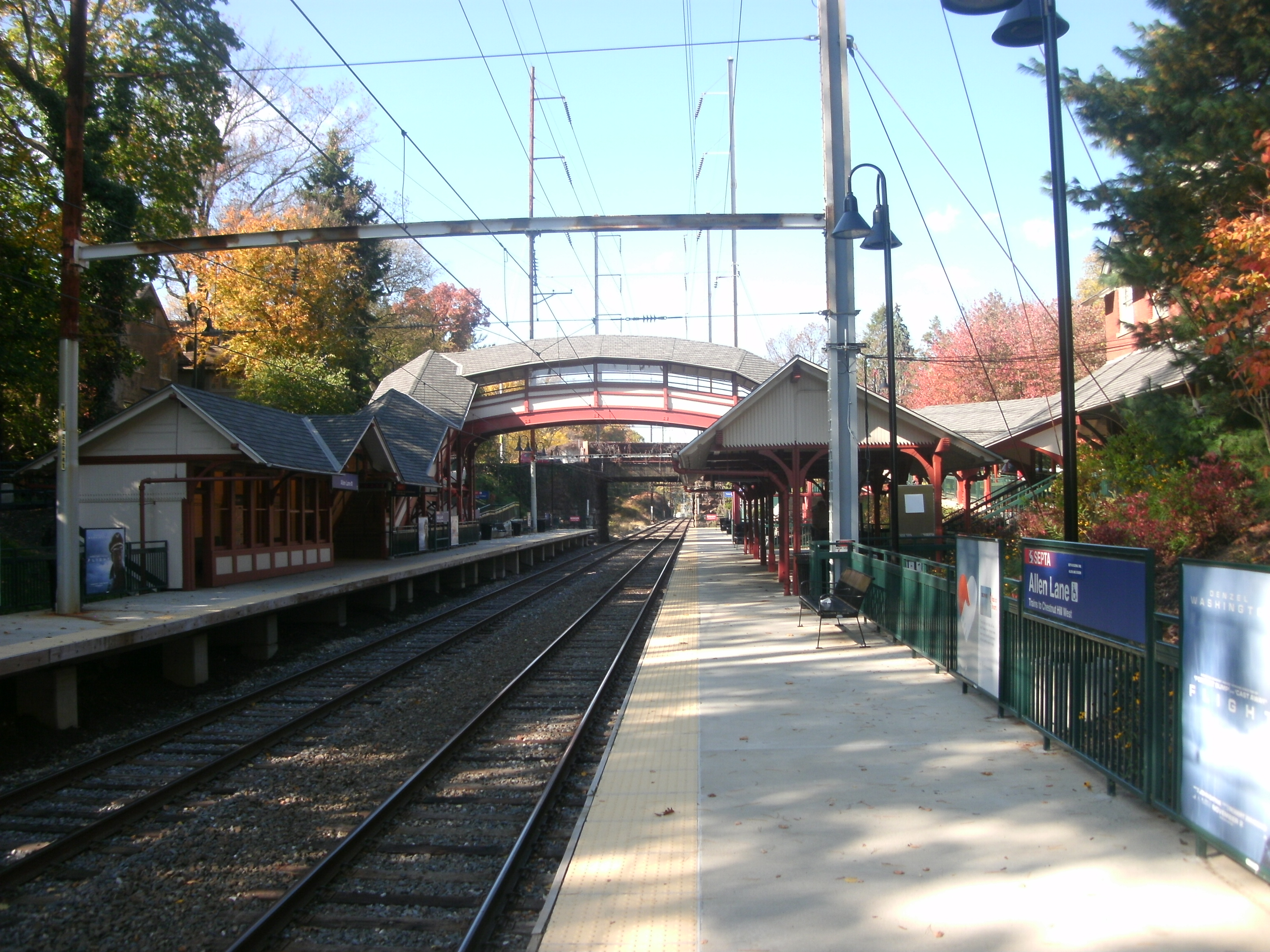
The Allen Lane station in October 2012 after construction of the high level platforms.

Allen Lane station underwent a two-phase restoration and renovation project in the late 1990s and early 2000s. The first phase of work on the historic station building and shelters was completed in September 1999. The second phase, which included the construction of high level platforms, a rebuilt pedestrian overpass, and accessible ramp, was completed in 2011.

== In popular culture ==
Allen Lane station was featured as a filming location for the 1988 film The In Crowd.
