= Connecting Railway =

Pennsylvania Railroad subsidiary linking Philadelphia and Trenton lines

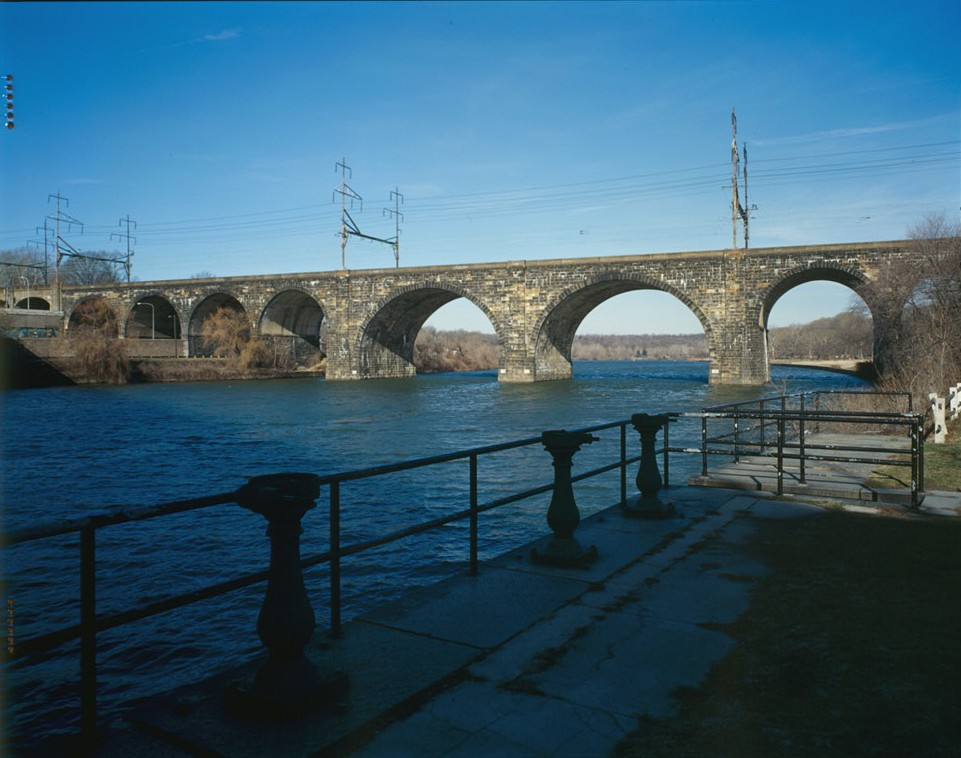
- The Connecting Railway Bridge over Schuylkill River, Fairmount Park, Philadelphia

Overview
- Parent company: Pennsylvania Railroad
- Locale: Philadelphia
- Dates of operation: 1863–1976

Technical
- Track gauge: 1,435 mm (4 ft 8 1/2 in)
- Length: 35.46 miles (57.07 km)

The Connecting Railway was a subsidiary of the Pennsylvania Railroad, incorporated to build a connection between the Philadelphia and Trenton Railroad and the PRR in the city of Philadelphia.

== Construction and assembly ==
=== Connecting Railway ===
The PRR controlled the Philadelphia & Trenton, and had originally intended to directly connect the two lines through the heart of Philadelphia. However, attempts to buy out and demolish buildings in the right-of-way led to riots, and the Philadelphia & Trenton was forced to end at Kensington. To resolve the problem, Connecting Railway Company was incorporated May 15, 1863, and between 1864 and June 1867, constructed a 6.75-mile (10.86 km) connecting line between Frankford Junction on the Philadelphia & Trenton and Mantua Junction (now Zoo interlocking) on the PRR mainline, passing through what is now North Philadelphia.

=== Bustleton Branch ===
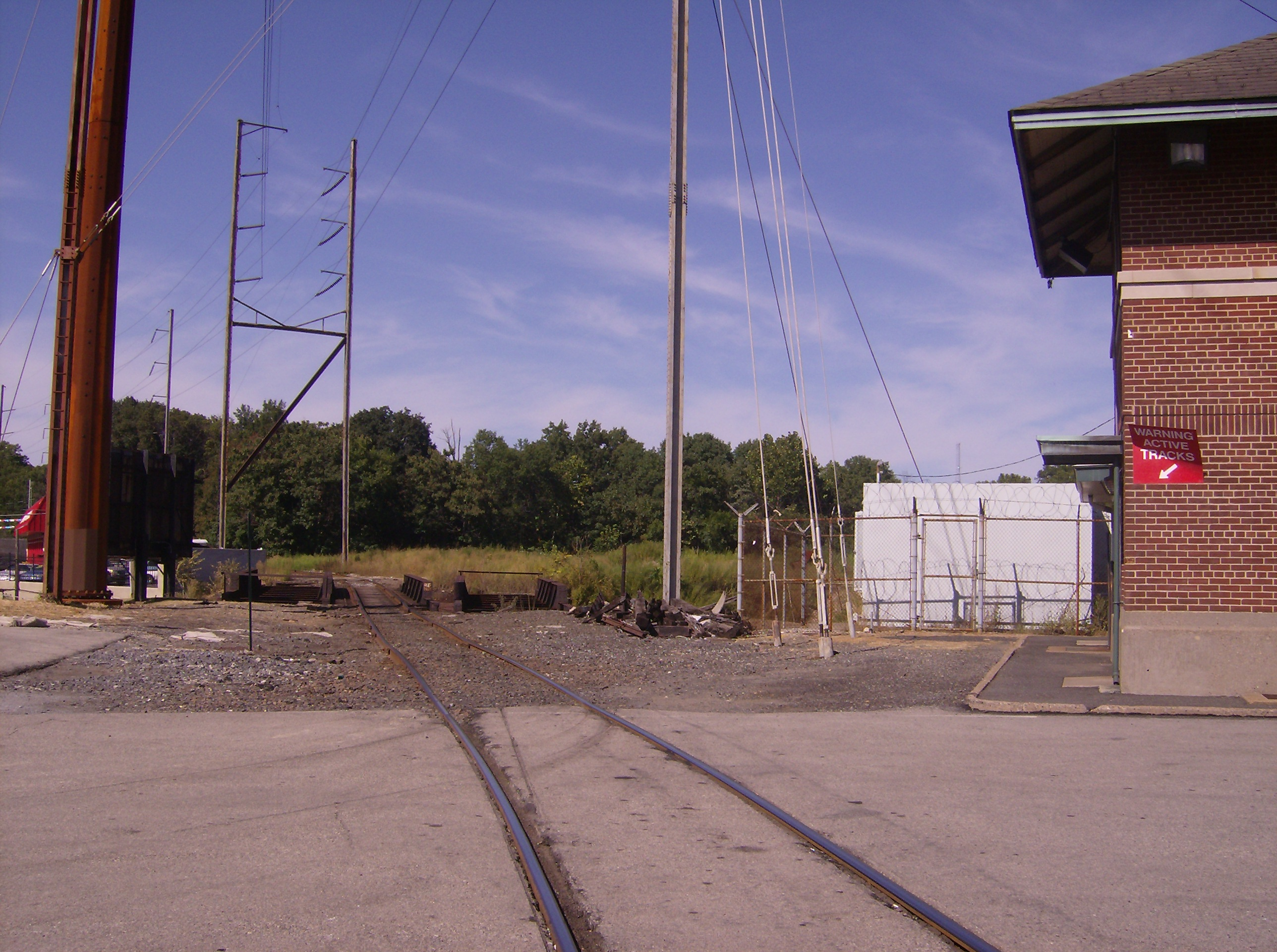
The Bustleton Branch splits from the Philadelphia & Trenton Line at Holmesburg Junction.

On July 18, 1863, the Frankford and Holmesburg Railroad was incorporated to build a line from Frankford to Holmesburg. This would have paralleled the Philadelphia & Trenton between those points. The charter was amended on April 10, 1867, to allow it to build from the Philadelphia & Trenton at Holmesburg Junction to the nearby town of Bustleton instead. It built 4.16 miles (6.69 km) of line between the two points about 1870. On January 1, 1871, it was leased to the Philadelphia & Trenton to operate as their Bustleton Branch. The company subsequently went bankrupt and was sold at foreclosure on November 18, 1890, and was reorganized on January 12, 1891 as the Bustleton Railroad and leased to PRR. Passenger service on the Bustleton Branch ended on February 13, 1926 due to high competition.

=== Chestnut Hill Branch ===
On January 2, 1883, the Philadelphia, Germantown and Chestnut Hill Railroad was incorporated, to construct a line between Germantown Junction (now North Philadelphia) and Chestnut Hill. This project was directed by Henry H. Houston. This line of 6.75 miles (10.86 km) was built between 1883 and 1884, closely paralleling the Chestnut Hill Railroad (controlled by the Reading), and now forms the basis of SEPTA's Chestnut Hill West Line. Between 1892 and 1893, two additional branches were built: the Midvale Branch, running 0.85 miles (1.37 km) from Midvale to the Midvale Steel Company plant, and the Fort Washington Branch or Cresheim Branch, running 6.27 miles (10.09 km) from Allen Lane to Fort Hill, where it connected with the Trenton Cutoff.

=== Kensington & Tacony Branch ===
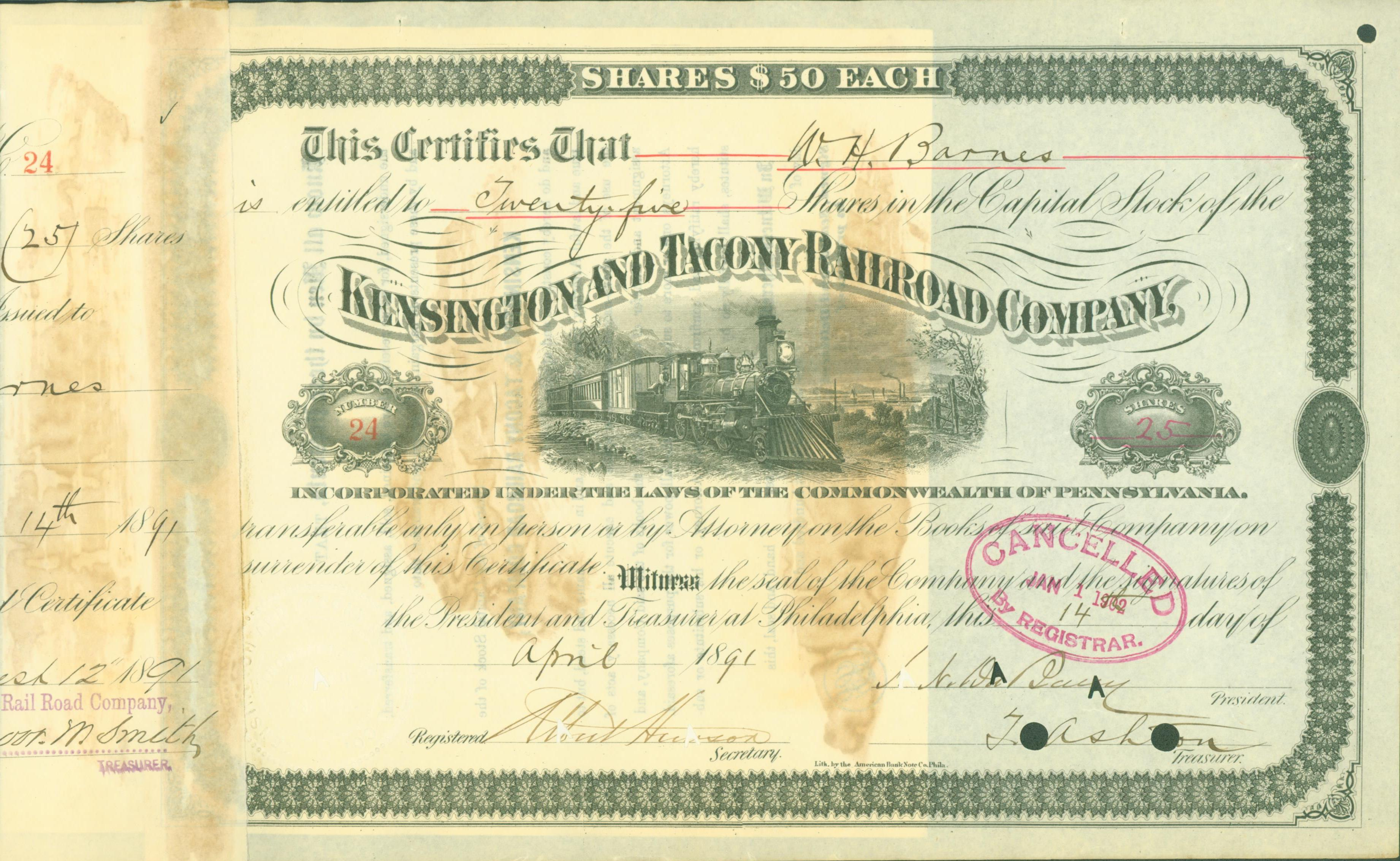
Share of the Kensington and Tacony Railroad Company, issued 14 April 1891

On March 26, 1884, the Kensington and Tacony Railroad was incorporated. From a connection with the Philadelphia & Trenton at Tioga Street and Delaware Avenue, it built 1.65 miles (2.66 km) along Delaware Avenue between 1886 and 1887. The Frankford Creek Railroad was incorporated March 17, 1890, and built 0.62 miles (1.00 km) of track from the Philadelphia & Trenton down Butler Street and towards Frankford Creek. It was merged on April 14, 1891 into the Kensington & Tacony as the Frankford Street Branch. The K&T built 2.85 miles (4.59 km) further along Delaware Avenue in 1891–1892 to connect to the Philadelphia & Trenton just east of Tacony, and extended the Frankford Street Branch 1.16 miles (1.87 km) across and parallel to Frankford Creek 1893–1894. At some point it also bought the connecting Philadelphia & Trenton line of 1.23 miles (1.98 km) from the P&T main down Tioga Street.

=== Oxford Road Branch ===
The Philadelphia and Bustleton Railway was incorporated on March 17, 1892 to build from Front Street and Erie Avenue, on the Connecting Railway mainline, to Bustleton. The Bustleton and Eastern Railroad was incorporated on January 27, 1893 to extend the Philadelphia & Bustleton from Bustleton to Fallsington, just west of Morrisville on the Trenton Cut-Off. The two were consolidated into the Philadelphia, Bustleton and Trenton Railroad on May 1, 1893.

The Philadelphia & Bustleton had done only a little grading and built several cuts and viaducts. The cuts and viaduct work that were performed can be seen today, as they are used as a bridle path through the Pennypack Park that run about 1/2 mile that runs from Krewstown Road to about 1/4 of a mile west of Bustleton Avenue on the south side of the Pennypack Creek. On the north and south sides of the creek, there is evidence of approach work for a trestle over the Pennypack Creek.

The Philadelphia, Bustleton & Trenton, after completing 3.55 miles (5.71 km) of the line in December 1896, built no further towards Fallsington. It crossed the Philadelphia and Frankford Railroad (Reading) about a mile south of its terminus.

=== Fairhill Branch ===
On June 13, 1892, the Fair Hill Railroad was incorporated, and built 0.78 miles (1.26 km) of line from the Connecting Railway mainline near Rosehill Street to Cambria Street 1895–1896.

=== Engelside Branch ===
On September 22, 1892, the Engelside Railroad was incorporated, and built 0.17 miles (0.27 km) of line from the Connecting Railway mainline near 32nd and Jefferson Streets to near 32nd and Thompson Streets, where it connected with the Reading (former Philadelphia and Columbia Railroad trackage).

On January 1, 1902, these seven corporations were consolidated into The Connecting Railway Company. This company and all its predecessors were directly or indirectly controlled by the PRR throughout their history. On December 9, 1956, the Pennsylvania, Ohio and Detroit Railroad, an agglomeration of certain PRR Lines West, was merged into the corporation. This was solely for the sake of corporate bookkeeping and had no effect on operations.

== Operations ==
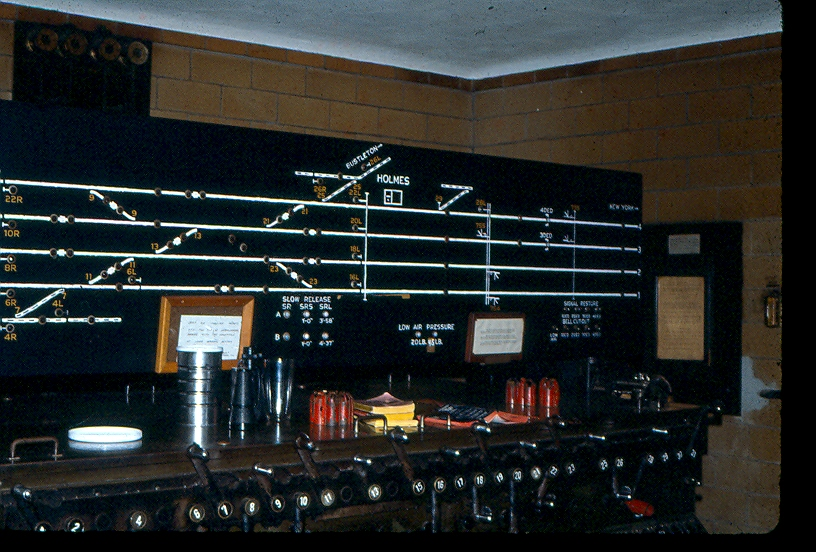
"HOLMES" Block Station (Holmesburg Junction), late 1970s

The Connecting Railway mainline was operated as part of the PRR mainline from Philadelphia to New York, providing through and local passenger service and extensive freight service to the many industries located in northern Philadelphia. The main passenger station on the line was North Philadelphia station. Because of the northern alignment of the Connecting Railway, passenger trains between New York and Pittsburgh would stop there only, bypassing 30th Street Station. The Chestnut Hill, Fort Washington and Bustleton Branches also saw passenger service; the other lines were exclusively freight lines. In particular, the Kensington & Tacony Branch served the upper Philadelphia waterfront and the Frankford Arsenal, and the Oxford Road Branch served a Sears distribution center near its crossing of the Reading.

Passenger service on the Bustleton Branch was discontinued in 1926, but the Chestnut Hill and Fort Washington Branches became part of the PRR suburban electrification program. Electrified service from Chestnut Hill to Broad Street Station began in 1918 and over the Fort Washington Branch in 1924. The rest of the mainline was electrified by 1935 to allow electric service to New York.

The Bustleton Branch diverged here (center of picture) and the K&T Branch diverged from the track leading the crossover at the bottom left. The tower closed in 1992.

== Abandonment ==
The little-used Fort Washington Branch was de-electrified, and passenger service discontinued in 1952. In 1953, the upper section of the branch from the Trenton Cutoff connection at Fort Hill to Wyndmoor was abandoned. In the 1960s, part of the right-of-way was used for Pennsylvania Route 309. The remaining section from Wyndmoor to Allen Lane continued to see freight service until the late 1970s; this remnant was abandoned and removed in the early 1980s.

The loss of industry in Philadelphia began to take its toll, and many of the freight branches became little-used. In 1973, the Oxford Road Branch was abandoned north of the Reading crossing. The Connecting Railway survived as a separate corporation through the Penn Central merger, but all its tracks were sold to Conrail and Amtrak in 1976 and the corporation was subsequently dissolved.

The main line became part of the Northeast Corridor, and the Chestnut Hill Branch was sold to SEPTA in 1983 (although Conrail continued switching industries along the line). The Bustleton Branch, Frankford Street Branch and Engelside Branch are still operated by Conrail Shared Assets Operations with parts of The Bustleton Branch operated by East Penn Railroad. The Fairhill Branch, Oxford Road Branch, Midvale Branch and the Kensington and Tacony Branch were abandoned during the 1980s. The Kensington and Tacony right-of-way has been converted to a rail trail.

== Gallery ==
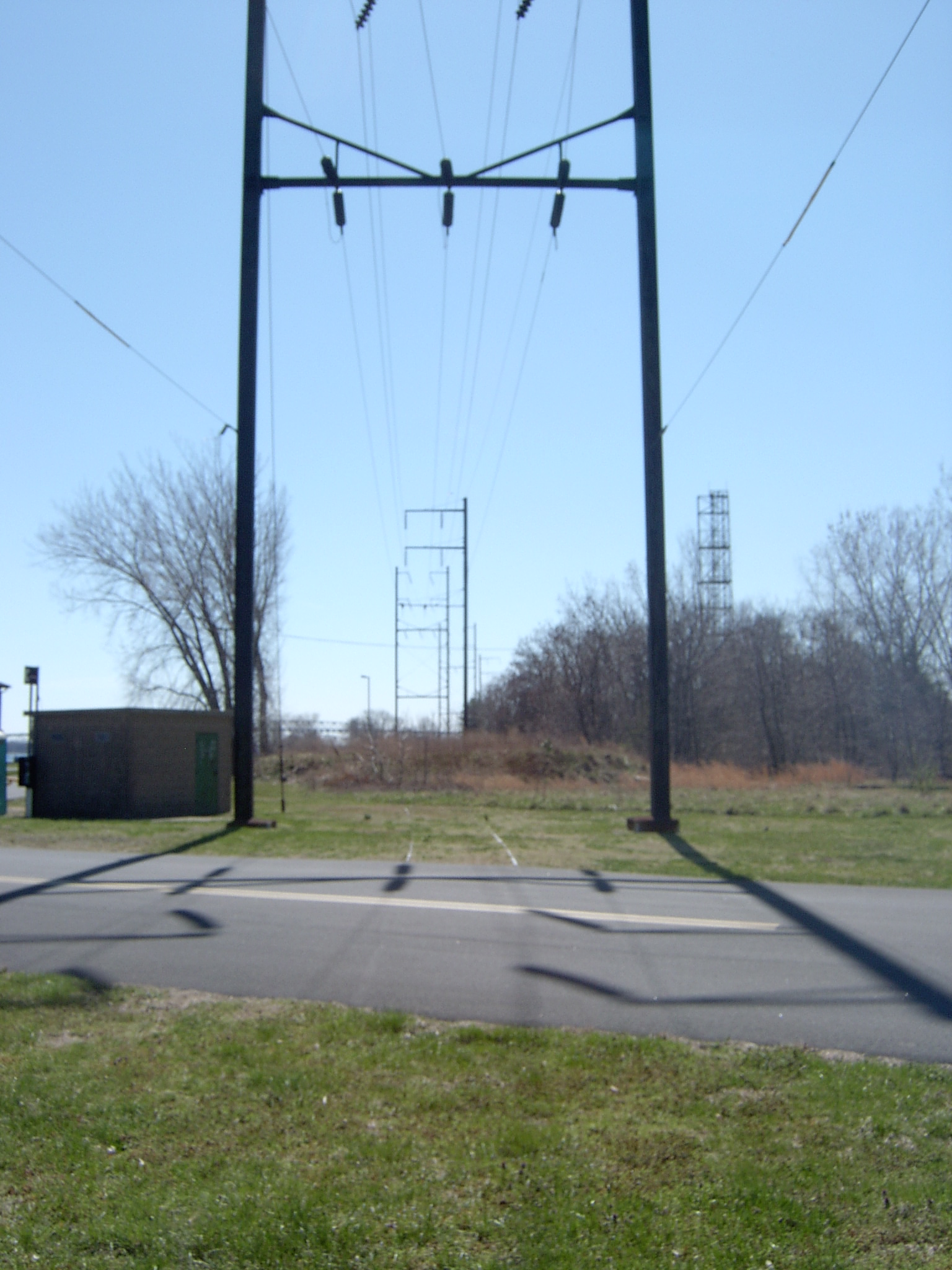
Abandoned K&T Branch, Behind Frankford Arsenal, 2006. Note rails disappearing into roadway for river access point

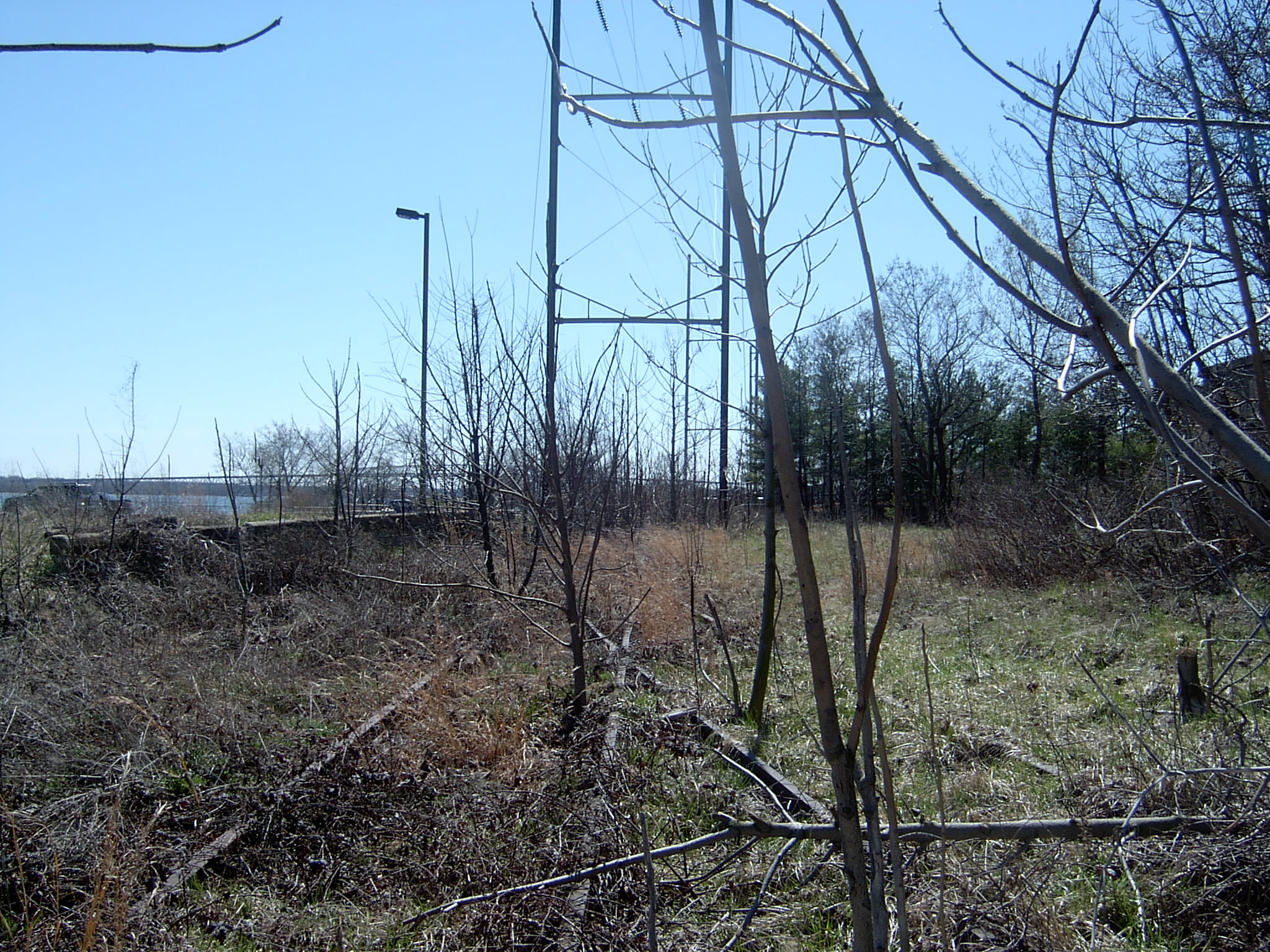
Abandoned K&T Branch, Behind Frankford Arsenal, 2006. Switch buried in weeds is one siding leading into the old arsenal complex

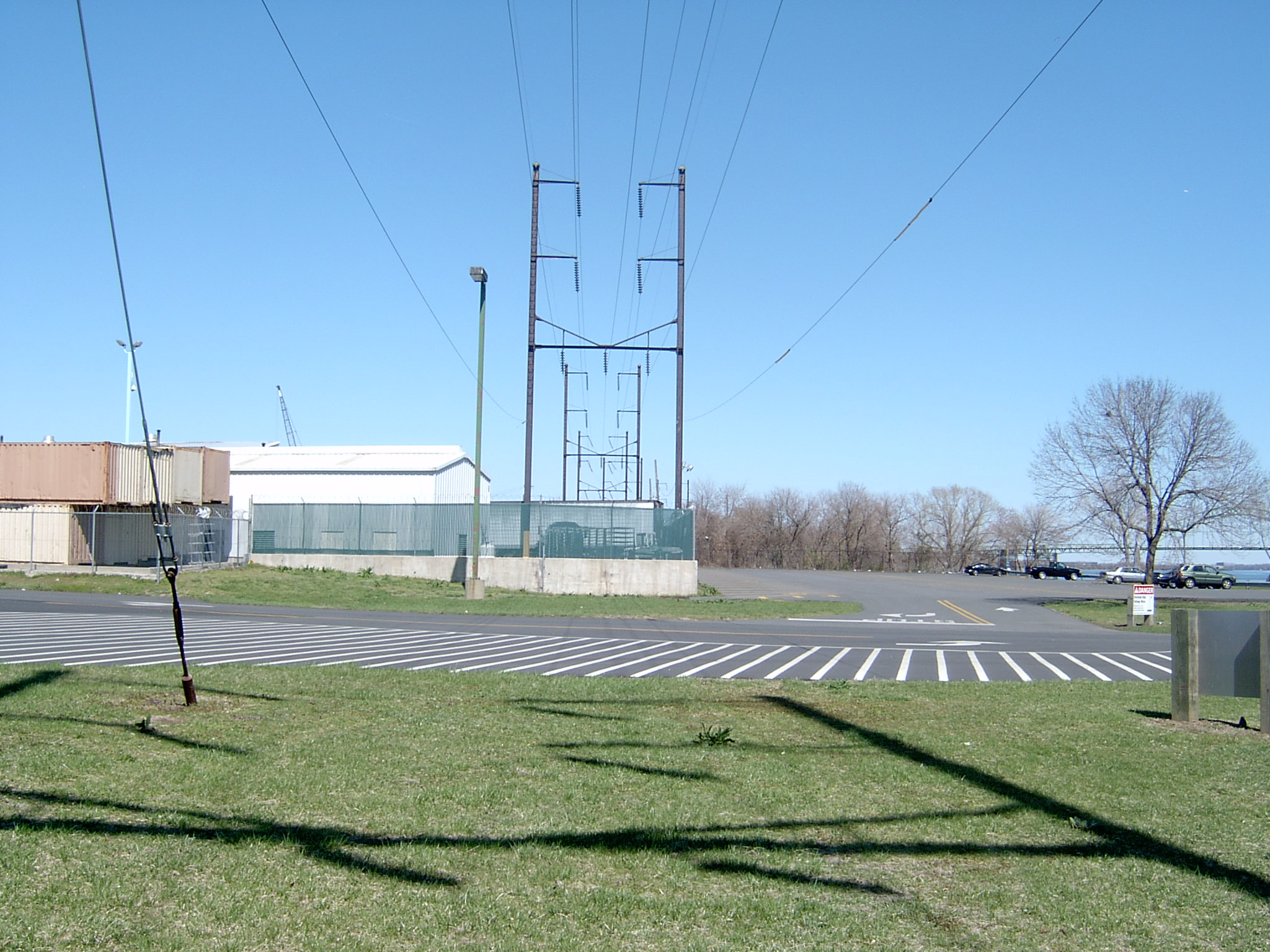
Abandoned K&T Right of Way, looking North just above Frankford Arsenal. Power lines followed the branch from Port Richmond to Tacony

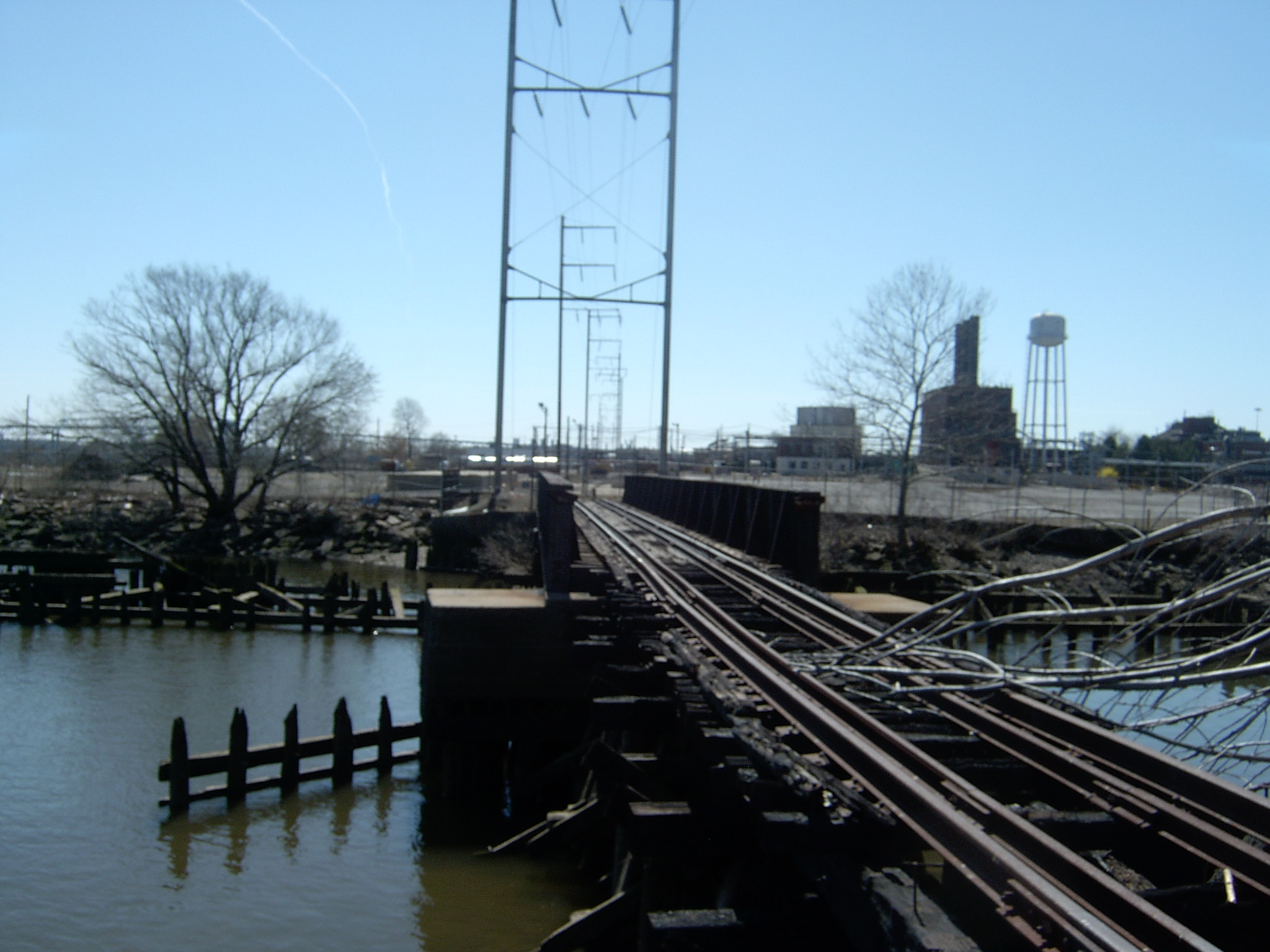
Abandoned K&T Bridge over Frankford Creek behind Frankford Arsenal, looking towards Kensington

Abandoned Tioga Street trackage linking the Philadelphia and Trenton to the Kensington and Tacony Branch (tank cars are on the old P&T)

Tioga Street trackage curved to the right and up a ramp to the P&T. The old roadbed ramp is now weed-covered and new curbing and railing blocks the old right of way

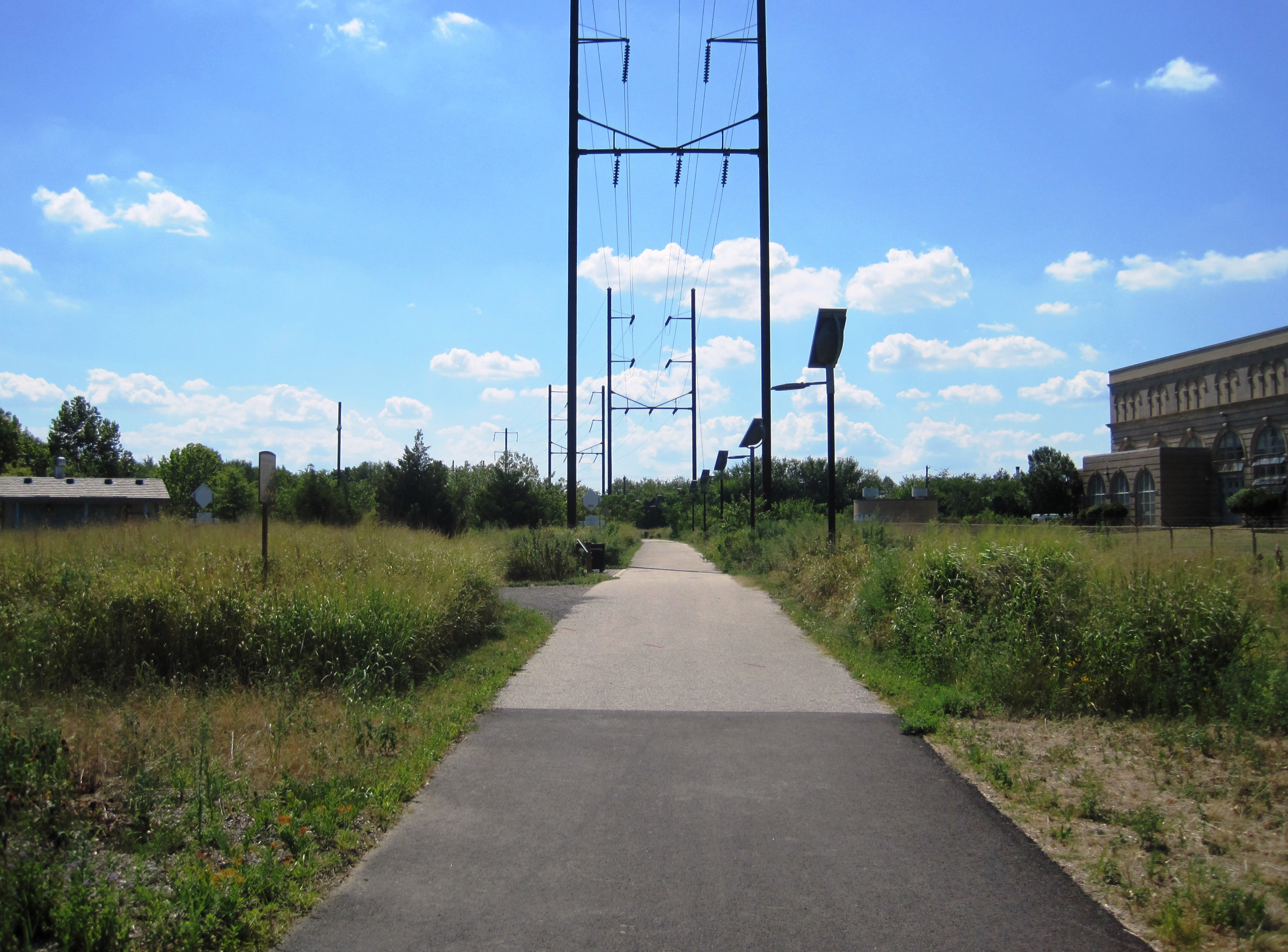
Repurposing of K&T Branch right-of-way as a rail trail at Lardner's Point in 2022
