= Carpenter's Station, Kentucky =

- Unincorporated community
- Location within Kentucky Location within the United States
- Coordinates: 37°26′27″N 84°51′37″W
- Country: United States
- State: Kentucky
- List of counties in Kentucky: Casey County
- Elevation: 958 ft (292 m)
- Time zone: UTC-6 (Central (CST))
  - Summer (DST): UTC-5 (CDT)

Carpenter's Station, Kentucky, originally "Carpenter's Fort", was established about 2 miles (3 km) west of present-day Hustonville, Kentucky, on the present-day county line between Casey and Lincoln counties, by three brothers, George, John, and Adam Carpenter, who ventured there from Rockingham County, Virginia, in the summer of 1779. The brothers were of Germanic descent, sons of George Zimmerman (Zimmermann anglicizes to Carpenter), who was born c. 1720 in Switzerland, emigrated to the colony of Pennsylvania around 1740, and settled in Rockingham County before the American Revolutionary War.
