= Philadelphia, Germantown and Chestnut Hill Railroad =

Overview
- Parent company: Pennsylvania Railroad
- Dates of operation: 1883–1902
- Successor: Connecting Railway

Technical
- Length: 13.87 miles (22.32 km)

The Philadelphia, Germantown and Chestnut Hill Railroad was a railway company in the United States. A subsidiary of the Pennsylvania Railroad, it was incorporated in 1883 to construct a line to the west side of the Chestnut Hill neighborhood in Philadelphia. The line opened in 1884; additional branches opened in 1893. The company was merged into the Connecting Railway in 1902.

== History ==
The Philadelphia, Germantown and Chestnut Hill Railroad was the brainchild of Henry H. Houston, a Philadelphia businessman who had invested in land on the west side of the Chestnut Hill neighborhood. The existing Chestnut Hill East Branch was too far to the east; a direct rail link with the rest of Philadelphia would spur growth.

The Pennsylvania Railroad lent its backing to the venture in 1879. The project was then known as the Germantown, Norristown and Phoenixville Railroad; the Philadelphia, Germantown and Chestnut Hill Railroad name was adopted in 1882 when the planned extension to Norristown and Phoenixville were dropped. The new company was incorporated on January 2, 1883.

The Pennsylvania Railroad leased the company in May 1883 and began construction. The new line was double-tracked, branching off from the Connecting Railway's line at North Philadelphia. The line, running 6.75 miles (10.86 km) to Chestnut Hill West, opened on June 11, 1884. The company also constructed two branch lines:

- the Fort Washington Branch, between Allen Lane and Fort Washington. This branch opened on July 30, 1893.
- the Midvale Branch, a short connection to Midvale Steel. This branch also opened in July, 1893.

The Philadelphia, Germantown and Chestnut Hill Railroad was merged into the Connecting Railway on January 1, 1902, along with the Kensington and Tacony Railroad, Bustleton Railroad, Fair Hill Railroad, Engleside Railroad, and Philadelphia, Bustleton and Trenton Railroad.
