= Carpenter's Station, Louisiana =

- Unincorporated community
- Location within Louisiana Location within the United States
- Coordinates: 32°27′46″N 91°34′05″W
- Country: United States
- State: Louisiana
- Parish: Richland Parish
- Elevation: 86.392 ft (26.332 m)
- Time zone: UTC-6 (Central (CST))
  - Summer (DST): UTC-5 (CDT)

Carpenter's Station, Louisiana, is an unincorporated historical community centered around a 19th century railroad stop in Richland Parish, Louisiana.

The 1875 Cram's Rail Road & Township Map of Louisiana and the 1879 Rand, McNally & Co.'s Business Atlas Map of Louisiana show the location as "Carpenter's" and "Carpenters" (respectively) between Bee Bayou and Delhi, Louisiana, east of modern-day Rayville in northeastern Richland Parish. The 1897 Rand, McNally & Co.'s New Business Atlas Map of Louisiana places "Carpenters" between Callaway and Delhi.

The railroad serving the community in 1879 was the Louisiana & Texas R. R. and in 1897 the Shreveport & Pacific R. R.
