= George Zimmerman (disambiguation) =

George Zimmerman (born 1983) is an American man known for fatally shooting Trayvon Martin in 2012.

George Zimmerman may also refer to:

- George J. Zimmermann (1882–1938), American mayor of the City of Buffalo, New York, serving 1934–1937
- George O. Zimmerman (1935–2019), Polish-American scientist and professor emeritus at Boston University

== See also ==
- George Zimmer (born 1948), American businessman and founder of the Men's Wearhouse
