= Chestnut Hill West Line =

SEPTA Regional Rail service

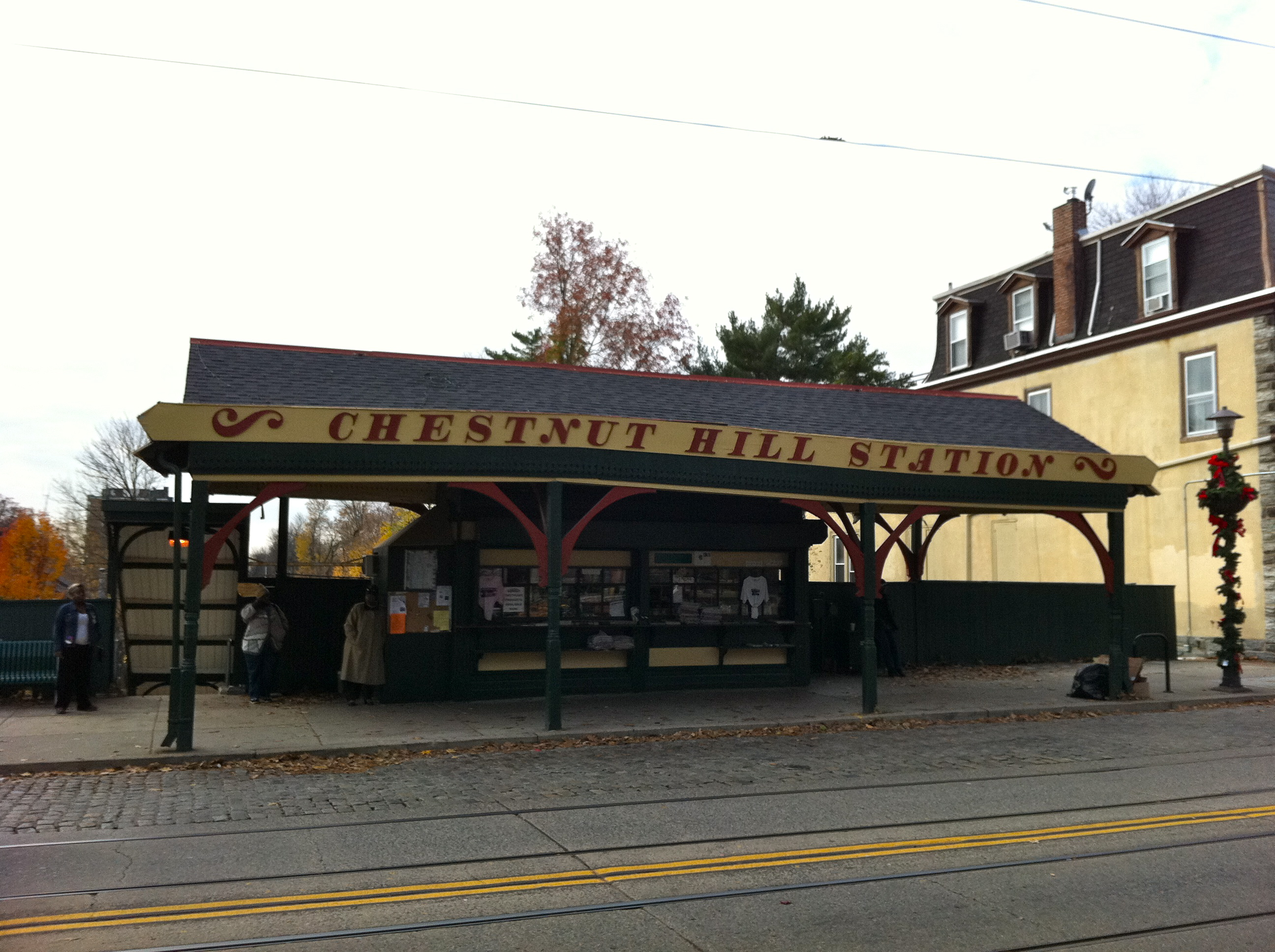
- Shelter at the terminal station in Chestnut Hill
- Daily ridership: 4,223 (FY 2024)

Route
- Termini: Chestnut Hill West; Temple University
- Stops: 14
- Lines used: Northeast Corridor; Chestnut Hill West Branch; SEPTA Main Line

Technical
- Rolling stock: Silverliner IV; Silverliner V
- Track gauge: 4 ft 8 1/2 in (1,435 mm) standard gauge
- Track owners: Amtrak; SEPTA

The Chestnut Hill West Line is a route of the SEPTA Regional Rail network. It connects Northwest Philadelphia, including the eponymous neighborhood of Chestnut Hill, West Mount Airy, and Germantown, to Center City.

== Route ==
Chestnut Hill West Line trains originate at Temple University on the SEPTA Main Line. They use the Center City Commuter Connection to reach 30th Street Station. From there, they use the Northeast Corridor to reach North Philadelphia, where the Chestnut Hill West Branch diverges from the Northeast Corridor. Its terminal is named Chestnut Hill West to distinguish it from the end of the Chestnut Hill East Line (a competing line of the Reading Company until 1976, when Conrail assumed operations, SEPTA took over in 1983). Some stations are less than half a mile apart, a characteristic more commonly seen in an urban rapid transit system rather than a commuter rail line. The line runs roughly parallel to the Chestnut Hill East, and the two terminals are rather close. The line is fully grade-separated.

== History ==

The line was originally opened June 11, 1884 by the Philadelphia, Germantown and Chestnut Hill Railroad, and was operated by the Pennsylvania Railroad until 1968. Electrified service began on March 30, 1918. The Penn Central operated it until 1976, turning operations over to Conrail until 1983, when SEPTA took over.

Between 1984–2010 the route was designated R8 Chestnut Hill West as part of SEPTA's diametrical reorganization of its lines. Chestnut Hill West trains operated through the city center to the Fox Chase Line. Plans had called for the line to be paired with West Chester/Elwyn Line and designated R3, but this depended on a never-built Swampoodle Connection from the Chestnut Hill West Line to the Norristown Line; this would have connected it to the former Reading Company side of the Center City Commuter Connection. As of 2026, most weekday Chestnut Hill West Line trains continue through Center City to the Fox Chase Line, while weekend trains continue to the West Trenton Line. While the line runs generally northbound between 30th Street and Chestnut Hill West, it is considered to run timetable south. This anomaly exists because SEPTA considers ex-Reading lines (including the Fox Chase Line) to run timetable north and ex-Pennsylvania lines to run timetable south.

Between June 26, 1987 – December 17, 1989 service terminated at Allen Lane with shuttle buses serving St. Martin's, Highland and Chestnut Hill West because of unsafe conditions on the Cresheim Valley bridge. The original iron bridge dated to 1884 and was replaced with a $7.6 million steel structure financed by the Urban Mass Transportation Administration.

SEPTA activated positive train control on the Chestnut Hill West Line on August 22, 2016.

On April 9, 2020, the line was suspended indefinitely due to the COVID-19 pandemic, though North Philadelphia station was still being served by other rail services. In addition to reduced ridership from the COVID-19 pandemic, service on the Chestnut Hill West Line was also suspended due to Amtrak construction along the Northeast Corridor that the line uses for part of its route. Service on the Chestnut Hill West Line resumed on March 8, 2021 on a limited schedule, with service running Monday through Friday. Weekend service was restored on December 19, 2021.

As of April 2025, SEPTA has made considerations to discontinue service on the line due to low ridership and systemwide budget cuts. However, on September 5, SEPTA cancelled the planned service cuts due to a court order being issued to restore SEPTA services. Instead, SEPTA would increase fares on the 14th.

== Stations ==
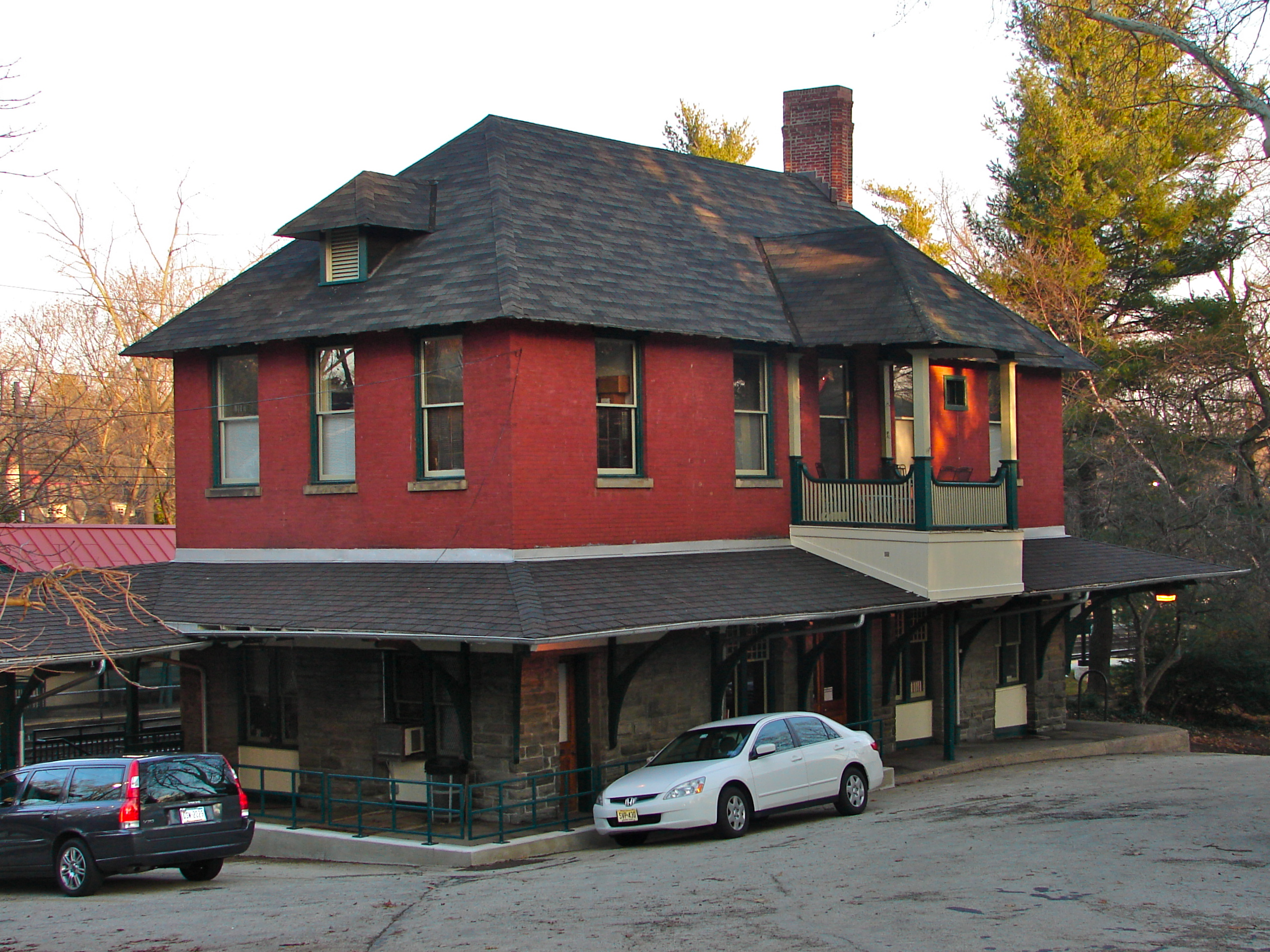
The Pennsylvania Railroad opened St. Martins in 1883

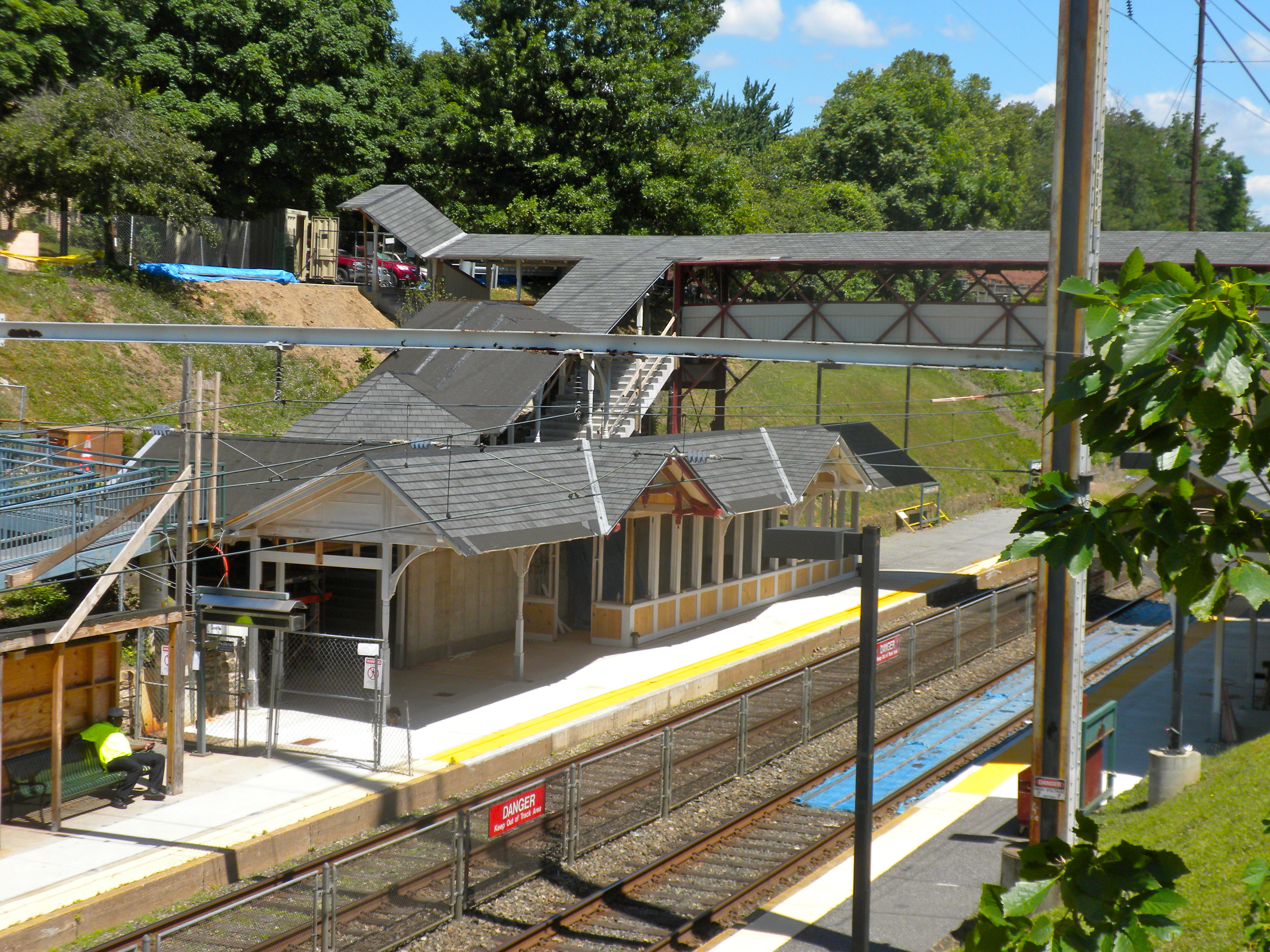
Queen Lane station

The Chestnut Hill West makes the following station stops after leaving 30th Street Station; stations indicated with gray background are closed. The entirety of the route is located within Philadelphia city limits.

Zone	Location	Station	Miles (km) from Center City	Date opened	Connections / notes
C	Mantua	Zoological Garden	1.9 (3.1)	1874	Closed November 24, 1901
C	Brewerytown	Engleside	2.8 (4.5)		Closed April 5, 1903
C	Strawberry; Mansion	Ridge Avenue	3.2 (5.1)		Closed April 5, 1903.
C	Strawberry; Mansion	22nd Street	3.9 (6.3)		
1	Glenwood	North Philadelphia	4.5 (7.2)		Amtrak: Keystone Service; SEPTA Regional Rail: SEPTA Metro: SEPTA City Bus: 4, 16
1	Nicetown–Tioga	Westmoreland	5.5 (8.9)		Closed October 29, 1994
1	Germantown	Queen Lane	6.8 (10.9)		SEPTA City Bus: K
1	Germantown	Chelten Avenue	7.4 (11.9)	June 11, 1884	SEPTA City Bus: 26, 41
2	Germantown	Tulpehocken	7.9 (12.7)	June 11, 1884	SEPTA City Bus: 53, 65
2	Mount Airy	Upsal	8.4 (13.5)		SEPTA City Bus: 71
2	Mount Airy	Carpenter	9.0 (14.5)	June 11, 1884	SEPTA City Bus: 53
2	Mount Airy	Richard Allen Lane	9.4 (15.1)		
2	Chestnut Hill	St. Martins	10.2 (16.4)		
2	Chestnut Hill	Highland	10.7 (17.2)	June 11, 1884	
2	Chestnut Hill	Chestnut Hill West	11.3 (18.2)	June 11, 1884	SEPTA Regional Rail: (at Chestnut Hill East); SEPTA City Bus: 23, 51, 77; SEPTA Suburban Bus: 94, 97

== Ridership ==
Yearly ridership on the Chestnut Hill West Line between FY 2013–FY 2019 remained steady around 1.3–1.6 million before collapsing during the COVID-19 pandemic. By FY 2025, ridership had improved to 1.2 million. (Note: Data for individual lines is not available for FY 2020.)
