= Cresheim Creek =

Coordinates: 40.05792°N 75.20186°W

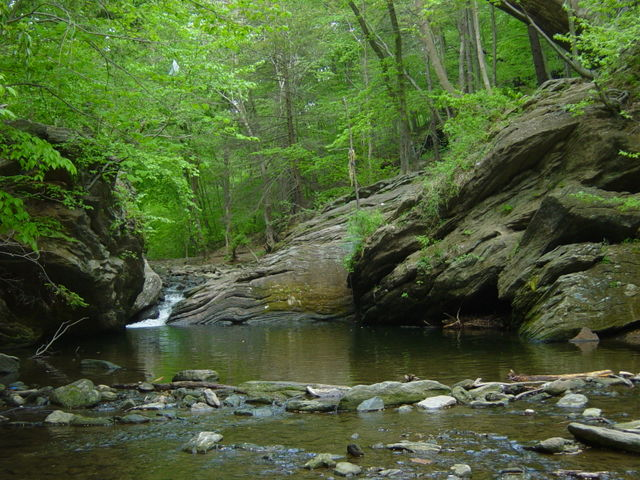
Cresheim Creek before it meets Wissahickon Creek.

Cresheim Creek is a creek in southeastern Pennsylvania. Rising at Wyndmoor in Springfield Township (in a park near the USDA's Agricultural Research Service Eastern Regional Research Center, adjacent to the border between Montgomery County and Northwest Philadelphia), it runs about 2.7 miles (4.3 km) southwest, passing through part of Northwest Philadelphia and forming the boundary between Mount Airy and Chestnut Hill, before emptying into the Wissahickon Creek at Devil's Pool not far south of the Valley Green Inn.

The Cresheim Valley below Germantown Avenue is part of Fairmount Park. The former railbed within it (see section below) is also an easement for PECO powerlines, which take advantage of the former railbed's grading and open space. In October 2013, the City of Philadelphia extended Fairmount Park ownership of the creek valley almost to the Philadelphia-Montgomery border at Stenton Avenue as part of the Wissahickon East Project, with ongoing and future efforts such as streambed cleanup and invasive species removal to restore the 6 acres (2.4 ha) of newly acquired land.

Cresheim Valley Drive runs beside the creek from Stenton Avenue until southwest of the Chestnut Hill West Line tracks, where the road bends away to become Emlen Street. The stone pergola that stands at the southwest corner of the intersection of Germantown Avenue and Cresheim Valley Drive contains plaques honoring both the early German settlers of the Cresheim Valley and Samuel Newman Baxter, chief arborist of Fairmount Park from 1915 to 1945.

== History ==
=== Pre-Euro-American and early-Euro-American periods ===
The area around Cresheim Creek was originally inhabited by the Lenape. Seventeenth-century (1600s) settlers of the German Township named the creek after the village from which they had emigrated (which is now part of Monsheim, Alzey-Worms, Rhineland-Palatinate). The aforementioned pergola plaque gives the settlers' spelling of the name as Krisheim. The settlers arrived in the 1680s. In 1700, they built Cresheim Cottage, the earliest permanent building in the vicinity, which is still standing at the intersection of Germantown Avenue and Gowen Avenue. (The original cottage comprises the smaller part of the present building; the larger part was built circa 1748.)

=== Cresheim Branch (Fort Washington Branch) of the Connecting Railway ===
From 1893 to 1978, a 6.5 mi (10.5 km) branch of the Connecting Railway, variously called either the Cresheim Branch or the Fort Washington Branch of the Pennsylvania Railroad, diverged from the Chestnut Hill Branch (present-day Chestnut Hill West Line) just north of Allen Lane station (behind what is now the campus of New Covenant Church and several schools) and ran next to the creek's bank from there to the creek's headwaters near East Lane station in Wyndmoor. The railbed curved through Hillcrest and Laverock in Cheltenham Township to meet and follow the right-of-way that is now occupied by the Fort Washington Expressway portion of Route 309 to Fort Hill, at a station named White Marsh (sic), near Fort Washington, where it connected with the Trenton Cutoff. The branch was electrified by the Pennsylvania from 1924 to 1952, more as an operational convenience for the railroad than for the line's negligible commuter traffic which the PRR never bothered to develop. The section of the branch below Queen Street in Wyndmoor remained in service for freight customers until 1978 when it was abandoned and the tracks removed.

Outdoor enthusiasts of Northwest Philadelphia and various Montgomery County communities have encouraged their local legislators to effect the conversion of the Cresheim Branch's railbed into a rail trail.

== See also ==
- List of rivers of Pennsylvania
