= Suburban Station =

Station on the SEPTA Regional Rail

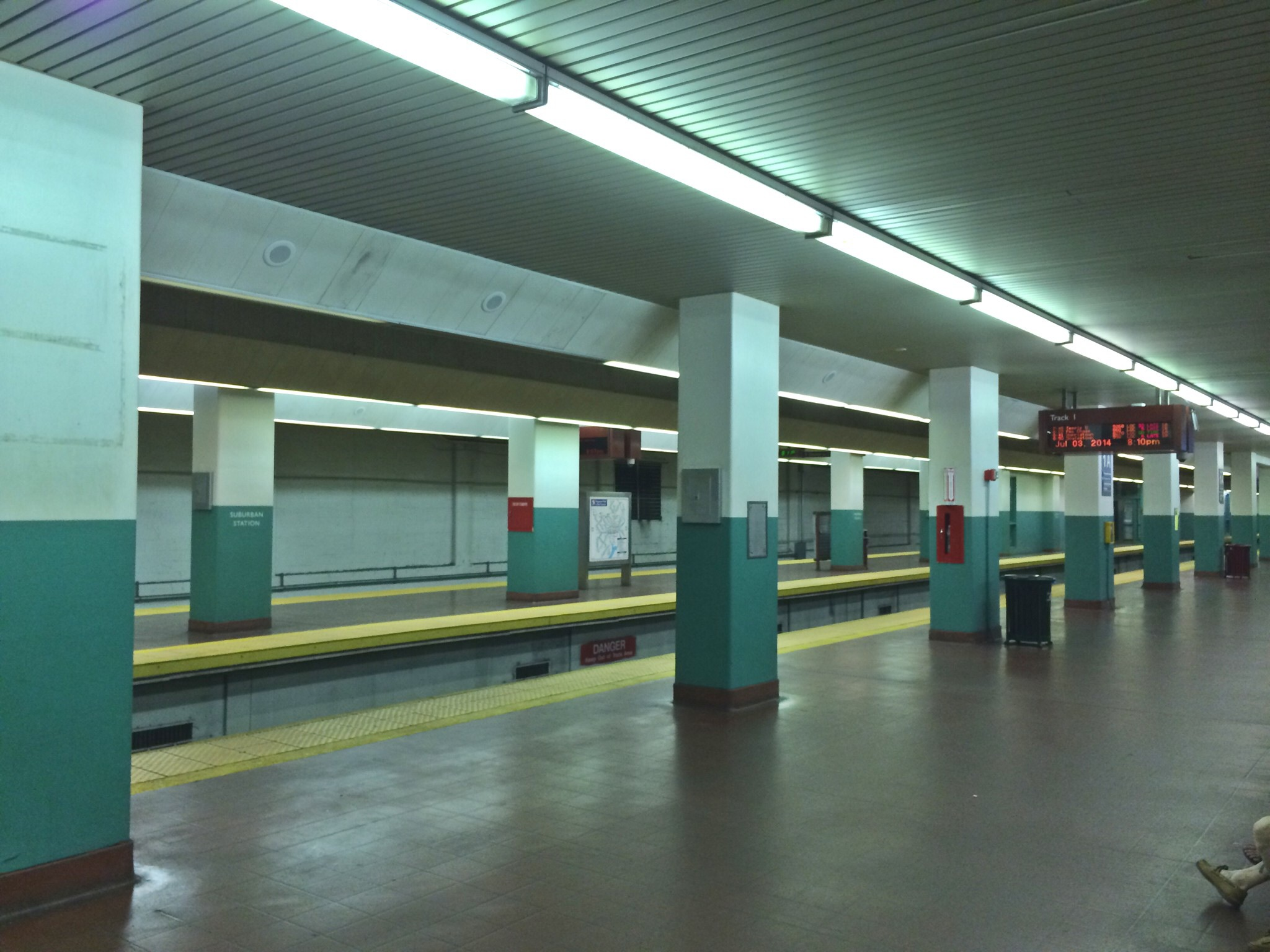
- The platform of Suburban Station in Philadelphia

General information
- Location: 1617 John F. Kennedy Boulevard; Philadelphia, Pennsylvania, U.S.
- Coordinates: 39°57′07″N 75°10′29″W
- Owner: SEPTA
- Line: SEPTA Main Line (Center City Commuter Connection)
- Platforms: 5 island platforms
- Tracks: 8
- Connections: SEPTA Metro: (15th Street/City Hall); SEPTA City Bus: 2, 4, 16, 17, 27, 31, 32, 33, 38, 44, 48; SEPTA Suburban Bus: 124, 125

Construction
- Cycle facilities: 22 rack spaces
- Accessible: Yes

Other information
- Fare zone: CC

History
- Opened: September 28, 1930 (replaced Broad Street station)
- Rebuilt: 2007
- Former names: Penn Center Station

Passengers
- 2017: 25,062 boardings, 25,062 alightings (weekday average)
- Rank: 1 of 146

Services
| Preceding station | SEPTA | Following station |
|---|---|---|
| 30th Street Station toward Airport | Airport Line | Jefferson Station toward Temple University |
| 30th Street Station toward Chestnut Hill West | Chestnut Hill West Line | Jefferson Station toward Temple University |
| 30th Street Station toward Wawa Station | Media/Wawa Line | Jefferson Station toward Temple University |
| 30th Street Station toward Thorndale | Paoli/Thorndale Line | Jefferson Station toward Temple University |
| 30th Street Station toward Trenton | Trenton Line | Jefferson Station toward Temple University |
| 30th Street Station toward Newark | Wilmington/Newark Line | Jefferson Station toward Temple University |
| 30th Street Station toward Cynwyd | Cynwyd Line | Terminus |
| 30th Street Station Terminus | Chestnut Hill East Line | Jefferson Station toward Chestnut Hill East |
| 30th Street Station toward Penn Medicine Station | Fox Chase Line | Jefferson Station toward Fox Chase |
| 30th Street Station toward Penn Medicine Station | Lansdale/Doylestown Line | Jefferson Station toward Doylestown |
| 30th Street Station toward Penn Medicine Station | Manayunk/Norristown Line | Jefferson Station toward Norristown–Elm Street |
| 30th Street Station toward Penn Medicine Station | Warminster Line | Jefferson Station toward Warminster |
| 30th Street Station toward Penn Medicine Station | West Trenton Line | Jefferson Station toward West Trenton |
Former services
| Preceding station | Amtrak | Following station |
|---|---|---|
| Philadelphia–30th Street toward Washington, D.C. | Chesapeake 1980–1981 | Terminus |
| Philadelphia–30th Street toward Harrisburg | Keystone Service 1981–1988 | Terminus |
| Preceding station | Pennsylvania Railroad | Following station |
| Philadelphia toward Pottsville | Schuylkill Branch | Terminus |
| Philadelphia toward Chestnut Hill | Chestnut Hill Line | Terminus |
| Philadelphia toward White Marsh | Fort Washington Branch | Terminus |
| Philadelphia toward Norristown–Haws Avenue | Norristown Line | Terminus |
| Philadelphia toward Paoli | Paoli Line | Terminus |
| Philadelphia toward Trenton | Trenton Line | Terminus |
| Philadelphia toward West Chester | West Chester Line | Terminus |
| Philadelphia toward Wilmington | Wilmington Line | Terminus |
- Suburban Station Building
- U.S. National Register of Historic Places
- Interactive map of Suburban Station Building
- Architects: Graham, Anderson, Probst & White; Stewart, Joseph, & Co.
- Architectural style: Art Deco
- NRHP reference No.: 85001962
- Added to NRHP: September 5, 1985
Track layout
- JFK Boulevard and Cuthbert Steet are omitted
Location

Suburban Station is an Art Deco office building and underground commuter rail station in Penn Center in Philadelphia. Its official SEPTA address is 16th Street and JFK Boulevard. The station is owned and operated by SEPTA and is one of the three core Center City stations on the SEPTA Regional Rail and one of the busiest stations in the Regional Rail system.

The station, which was built by the Pennsylvania Railroad to replace the original Broad Street Station, opened on September 28, 1930.

== History ==
=== 20th century ===
The station opened as a stub-end terminal for Pennsylvania Railroad (PRR) suburban commuter trains serving Center City Philadelphia, intended to replace the above-ground Broad Street Station in this function. PRR intercity trains, on the other hand, would use 30th Street Station. The station's full name was originally Broad Street Suburban Station. It also includes a 21-story office tower, One Penn Center, which served as the headquarters of the PRR from 1930 to 1957.

When Amtrak took over the Silverliner Service from Penn Central in 1972, it was operated as a quasi-commuter service (Clockers and express trains to New York) that terminated at Suburban Station. The trains through Harrisburg were named Keystone Service in 1981. By the late 1980s, the Metroliners used for the service were in poor shape, but Amtrak had a shortage of AEM-7 locomotives due to wrecks.

On February 1, 1988, Amtrak converted all Keystone Service trains to diesel power and terminated them on the lower level of 30th Street Station, since diesel-powered trains were prohibited from operating in the tunnels leading to Suburban Station. The change was listed as "temporary" on timetables starting on May 15, 1988, and lasting into 1990.

Suburban Station was originally a stub-end terminal station with eight tracks and four platforms. Plans for a tunnel to link the Pennsylvania and Reading commuter lines were floated as early as the 1950s, but funding to seriously study the project did not start until SEPTA's formation in the late 1960s. The project languished in the 1970s for want of funding until federal money was appropriated during Philadelphia mayor Frank Rizzo's time in office. SEPTA took over operation of all commuter rail service in the Philadelphia area in 1983; it had previously contracted these operations to Reading and the PRR from 1966 and then to Conrail from 1976 to 1983. A train crash occurred here on December 10, 1986, when an Airport Line train ran into a stopped Chestnut Hill West train, injuring 42 people. The operator tested positive for drugs.

The link between the old PRR and Reading lines, the Center City Commuter Connection, opened in 1984. It extended four tracks eastward to the new Market East Station, now known as Jefferson Station, widened two of the existing platforms, added a fifth platform and realigned the tracks.

=== 21st century ===
The renovated building above the station is the core of the Penn Center office complex, and is known as One Penn Center at Suburban Station. The office building attained an Energy Star Rating in 2009.

BLT Architects transformed Suburban Station in 2006. The station was redesigned to make navigation easier and adapt to current pedestrian traffic. Upgrades included increased retail space, a reactivated and improved HVAC system, and a restored/refurbished waiting area.

The station is now in full compliance with the Americans with Disabilities Act of 1990. The Comcast Center, situated on the north half of its block near Arch Street, adds a "winter garden" on the south side, which serves as a new back entrance to the station, with the commuter rail tracks about 50 feet below street level.

== Services ==
All SEPTA Regional Rail trains stop at this station. All run through except those on the Cynwyd Line as well as some limited/express trains which terminate on one of the stub-end tracks at this station. Through trains usually change crews at this station.

The station has an extensive concourse level above track level. This concourse has SEPTA ticket offices, retail shops and restaurants, and access to other SEPTA stations and to several Center City buildings. The connections, via the large Center City Concourse, include the L, B, and T at the 15th Street/City Hall station, and the PATCO Speedline at 15–16th & Locust station.

=== Station layout ===
The station has a total of 8 tracks and 5 island platforms. It also includes a 7-11, two Dunkin’s, an Enerjuicer, and more.

== Gallery ==
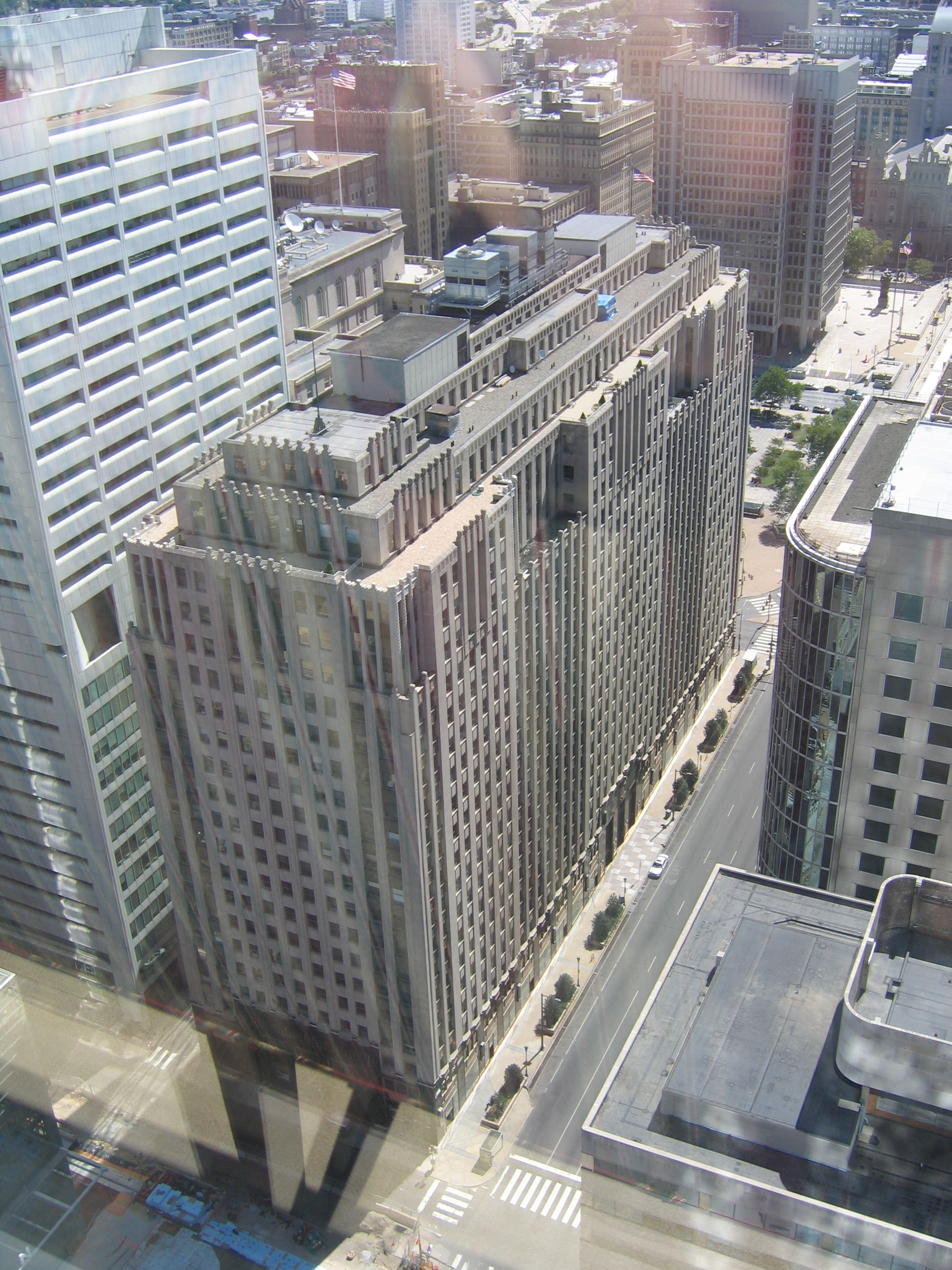
Aerial view of Suburban Station

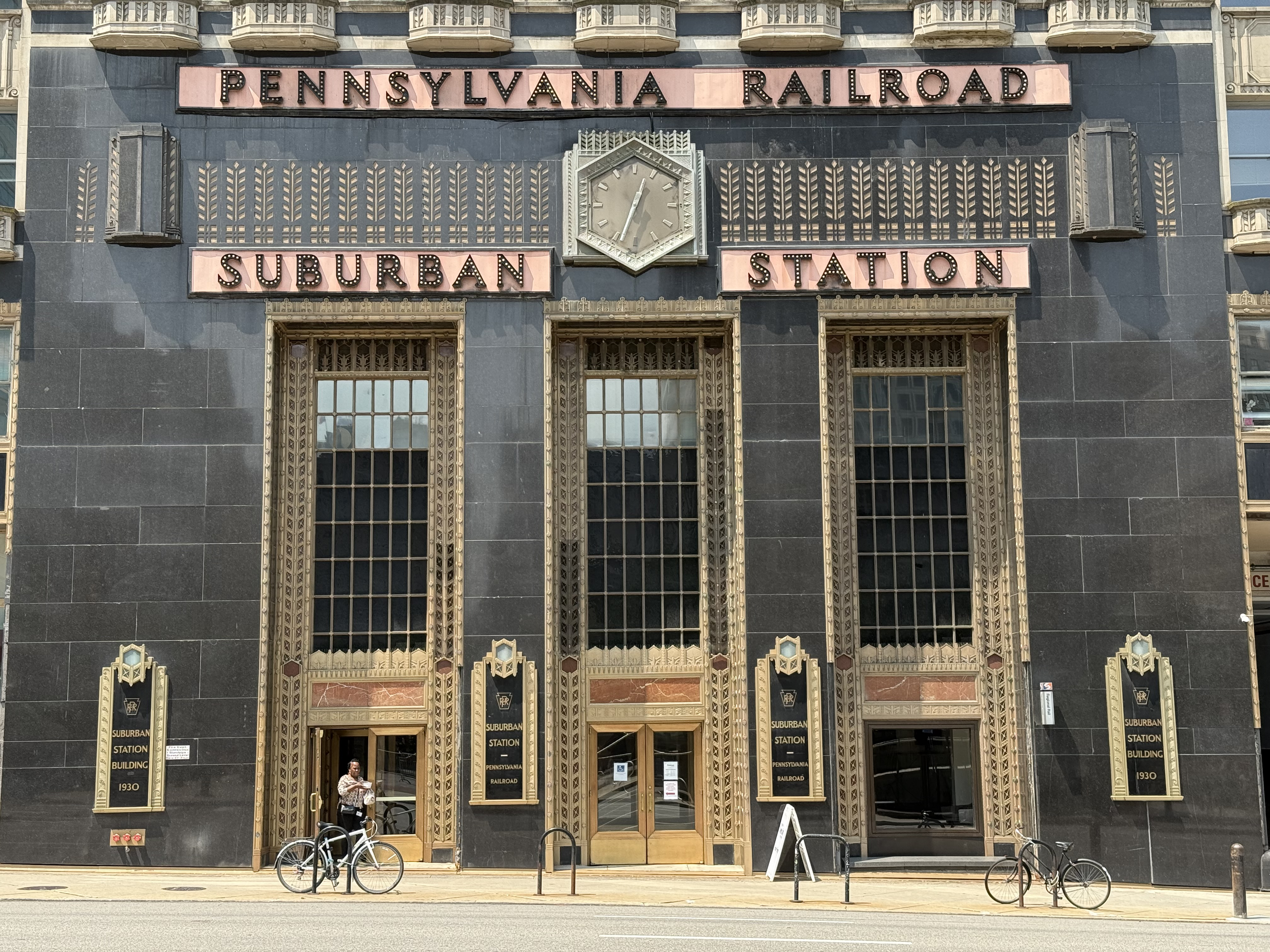
Front entrance of Suburban Station

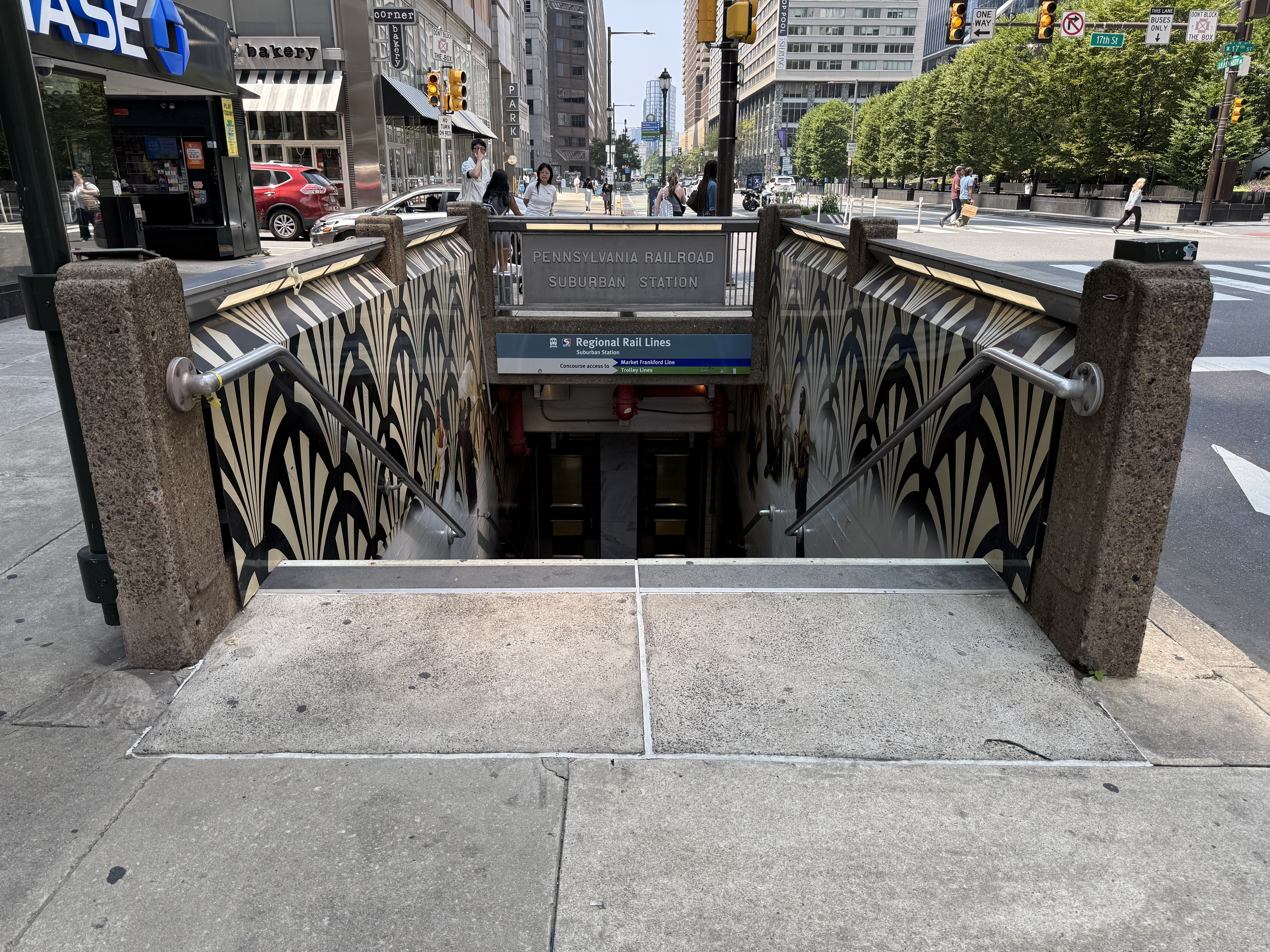
Underground entrance

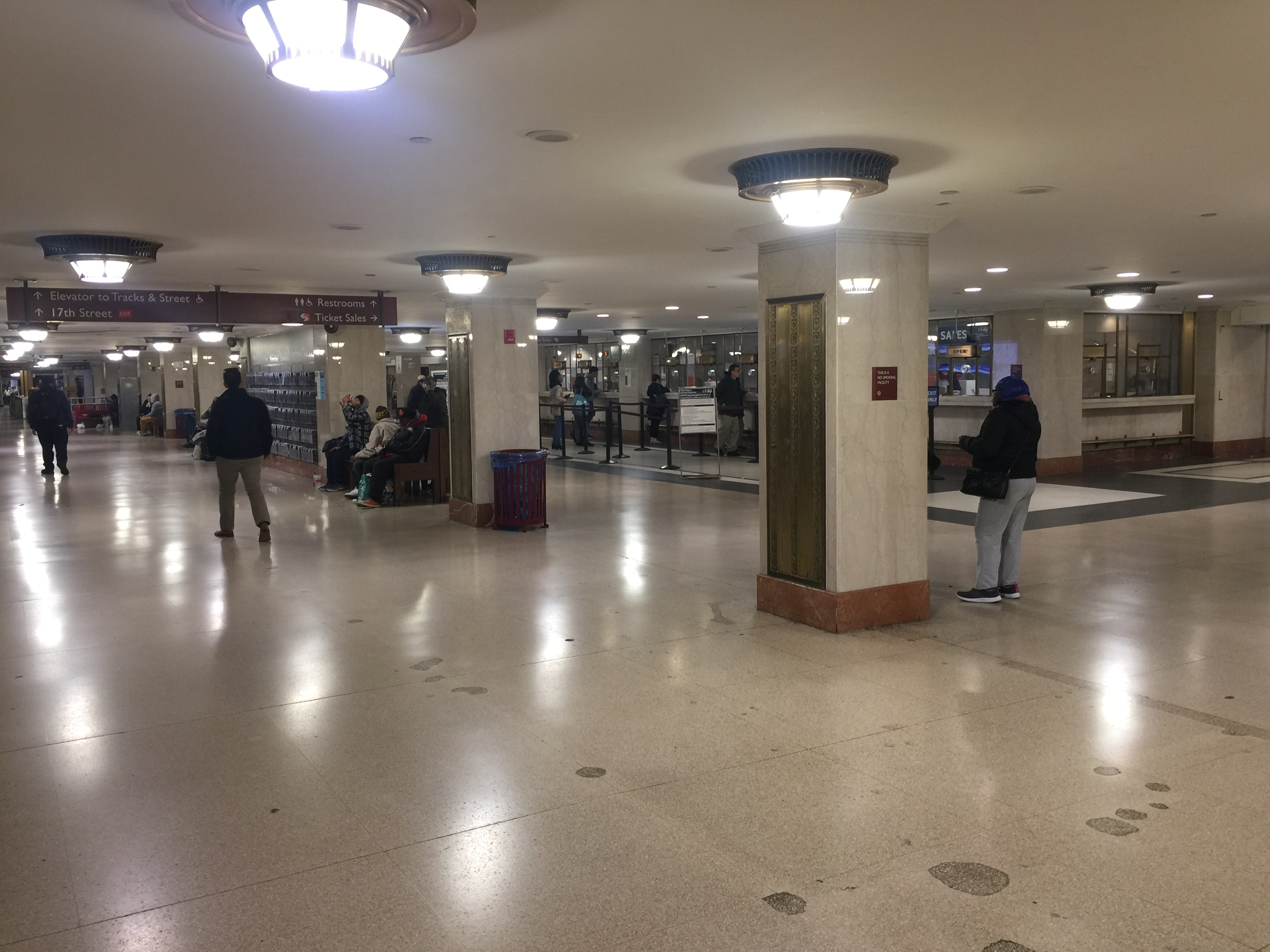
Waiting area

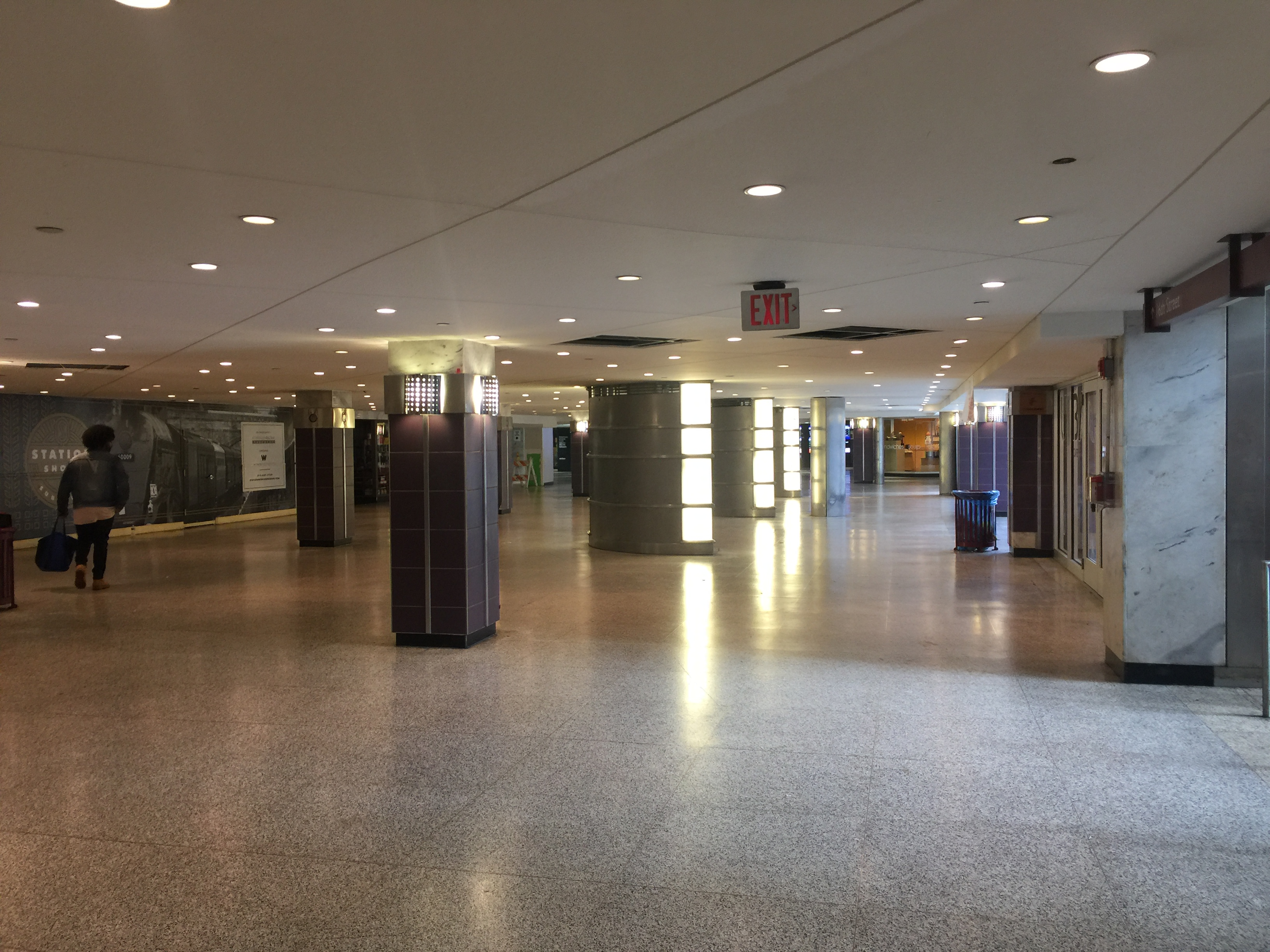
Concourse shops

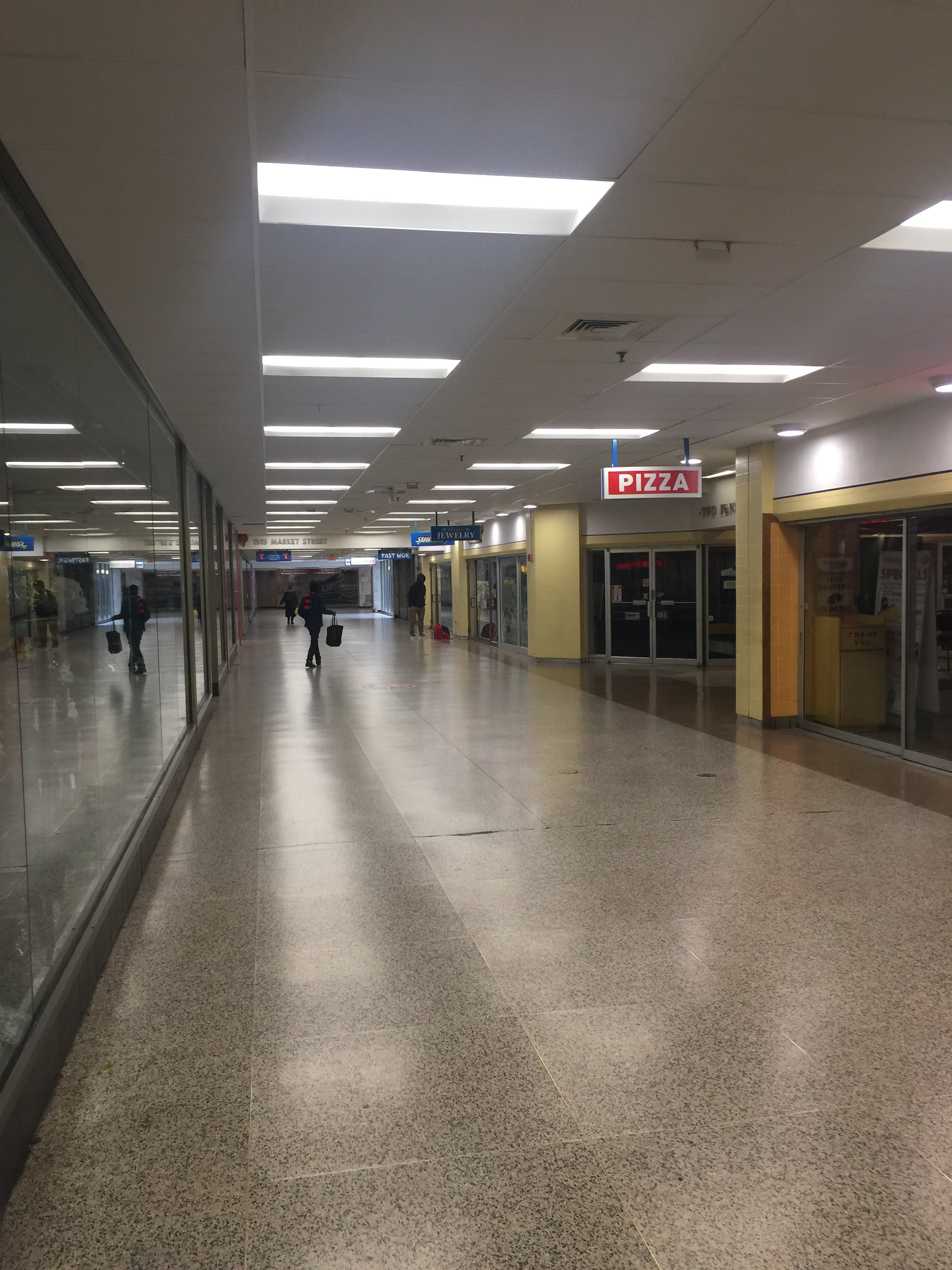
Concourse shops

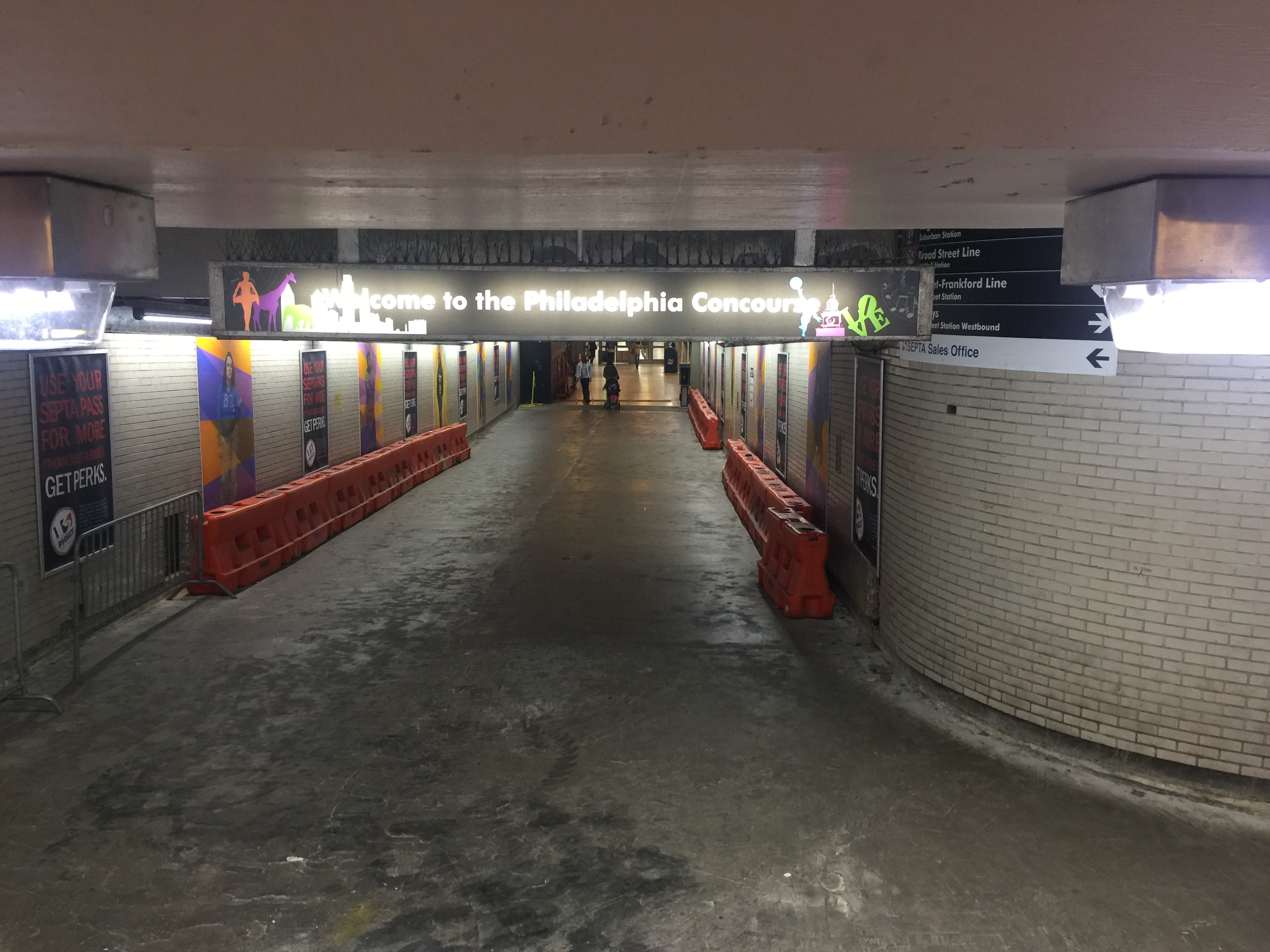
Entrance to the concourse
