= Chestnut Hill West station =

SEPTA train station in Chestnut Hill, Philadelphia, Pennsylvania, United States

Chestnut Hill West
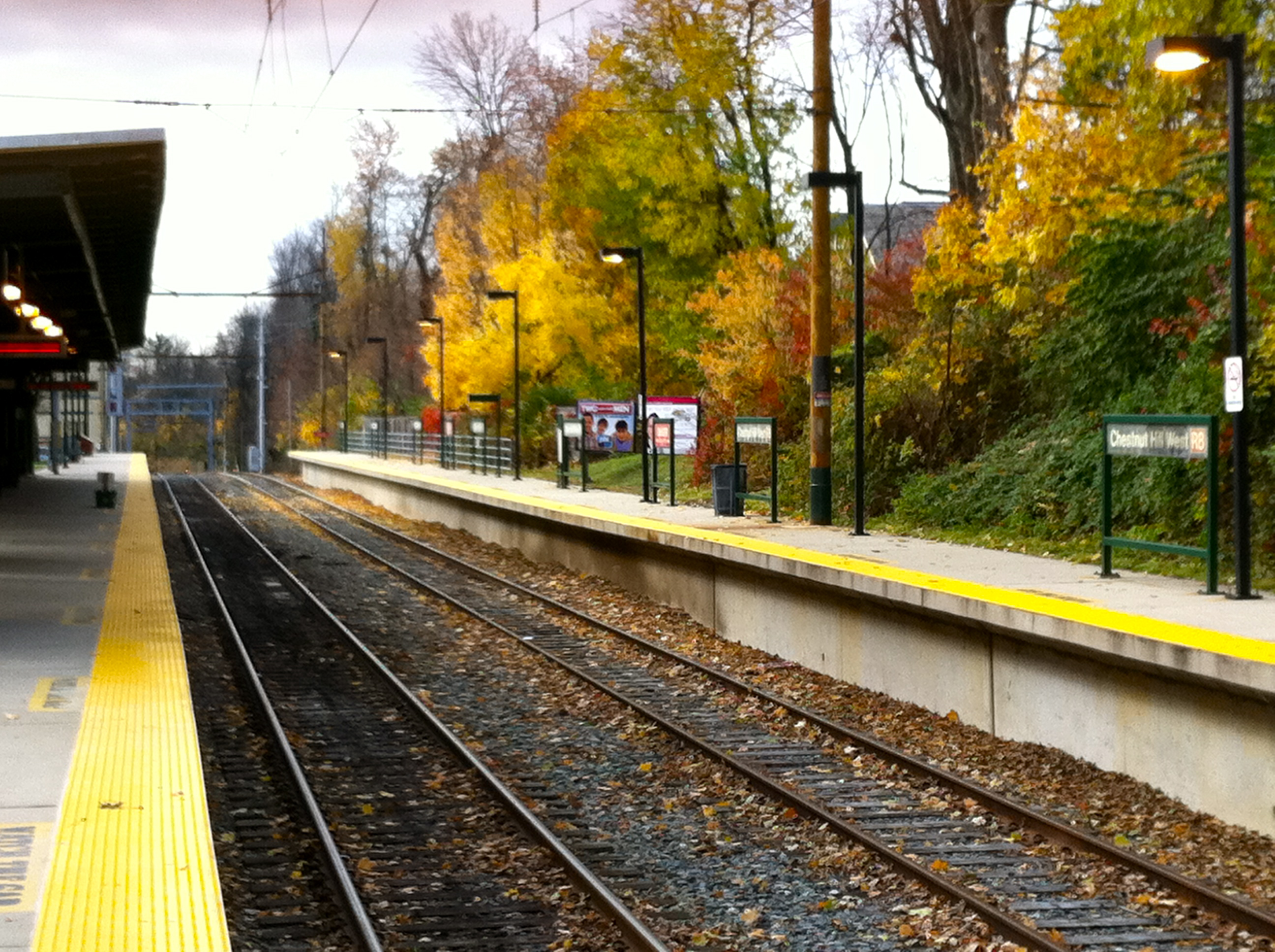
- Former Pennsylvania Railroad Line

General information
- Location: 9 West Evergreen Avenue; Chestnut Hill, Philadelphia, Pennsylvania
- Coordinates: 40.0762°N 75.2084°W
- Owner: SEPTA
- Line: Chestnut Hill West Branch
- Platforms: 2 side platforms
- Tracks: 2
- Connections: Chestnut Hill East Line Chestnut Hill East station SEPTA City Bus: 23, 51, 77; SEPTA Suburban Bus: 94, 97

Construction
- Parking: 58 Spaces
- Accessible: yes

Other information
- Fare zone: 2

History
- Opened: June 11, 1884; 142 years ago
- Rebuilt: 1918; 108 years ago
- Electrified: March 22, 1918; 108 years ago
- Former names: Chestnut Hill (June 11, 1884–April 1, 1977)

Passengers
- 2017: 308 boardings 370 alightings (weekday average)
- Rank: 88 of 146

Services
Preceding station	SEPTA	Following station
Terminus	Chestnut Hill West Line	Highland toward Temple University
Former services
Preceding station	Pennsylvania Railroad	Following station
Terminus	Chestnut Hill Line	Highland toward Suburban Station
Location

Chestnut Hill West station is a SEPTA Regional Rail station in Philadelphia, Pennsylvania. Located at 9 West Evergreen Avenue in the Chestnut Hill neighborhood, it serves the Chestnut Hill West Line. It was originally built by the Philadelphia, Germantown and Chestnut Hill Railroad between 1883 and 1884, and later acquired by the Pennsylvania Railroad. In 1918, when the line was electrified, the station was rebuilt to accommodate the upgrade.

The station is in zone 2 on the Chestnut Hill West Line, on former Pennsylvania Railroad tracks, and is 11.3 track miles from Suburban Station. In 2013, this station saw 433 boardings and 479 alightings on an average weekday.

== SEPTA Bus connections ==
SEPTA City Buses

- Routes 23, 51, and 77

SEPTA Suburban Buses

- Routes 94 and 97
