= Chestnut Hill West Branch =

Railway line in Pennsylvania

Overview
- Owner: SEPTA

Service
- Services: Chestnut Hill West Line

History
- Opened: June 11, 1884

Technical
- Line length: 6.9 mi (11.1 km)
- Number of tracks: 2
- Track gauge: 1,435 mm (4 ft 8 1/2 in) standard gauge
- Electrification: 12 kV 25 Hz overhead catenary

The Chestnut Hill West Branch is a railway line in Pennsylvania. It runs 6.9 miles (11.1 km) from a junction with the Northeast Corridor at North Philadelphia to Chestnut Hill, Philadelphia. It was built between 1883 and 1884 by the Philadelphia, Germantown and Chestnut Hill Railroad, a subsidiary of the Pennsylvania Railroad. It was part of the Pennsylvania Railroad system (and later Penn Central) until 1976. Today it is owned by SEPTA and hosts the Chestnut Hill West Line commuter rail service. The line runs roughly parallel to the Chestnut Hill East Branch, formerly of the Reading Company.

== History ==
The Philadelphia, Germantown and Chestnut Hill Railroad reached the Chestnut Hill neighborhood in Philadelphia in 1854. As the west side of Chestnut Hill attracted investment, developers sought to promote growth through a new railway line. This project attracted the interest of the Pennsylvania Railroad, and the Philadelphia, Germantown and Chestnut Hill Railroad was incorporated on January 2, 1883. Construction began that May, and the new line, double-tracked from the outset, opened on June 11, 1884. The new line branched off from the Connecting Railway's main line at North Philadelphia, and ran north to Chestnut Hill West, approximately 1,600 feet (490 m) south of Chestnut Hill East.

Under the Pennsylvania Railroad the line was known as the Germantown and Chestnut Hill Branch or simply the Chestnut Hill Branch. In 1913 the Pennsylvania decided to electrify the branch, along with the main line between Broad Street Station and Paoli and the New York division between Broad Street and North Philadelphia. Electrified service to Chestnut Hill began in April 1918.

The Philadelphia, Germantown and Chestnut Hill Railroad was merged into the Connecting Railway in 1902. The Connecting Railway remained the owner of the line through the Penn Central merger in 1968. With the Penn Central's final bankruptcy in 1976, the Chestnut Hill Branch was conveyed to Conrail and then SEPTA. Between June 26 and December 17, 1989, service terminated at Allen Lane with shuttle buses serving St. Martin's, Highland and Chestnut Hill West because of unsafe conditions on the Cresheim Valley bridge. The original iron bridge dated to 1884 and was replaced with a $7.6 million steel structure financed by the Urban Mass Transportation Administration. SEPTA activated positive train control on the Chestnut Hill West Line on August 22, 2016.
