= Phil-Ellena =

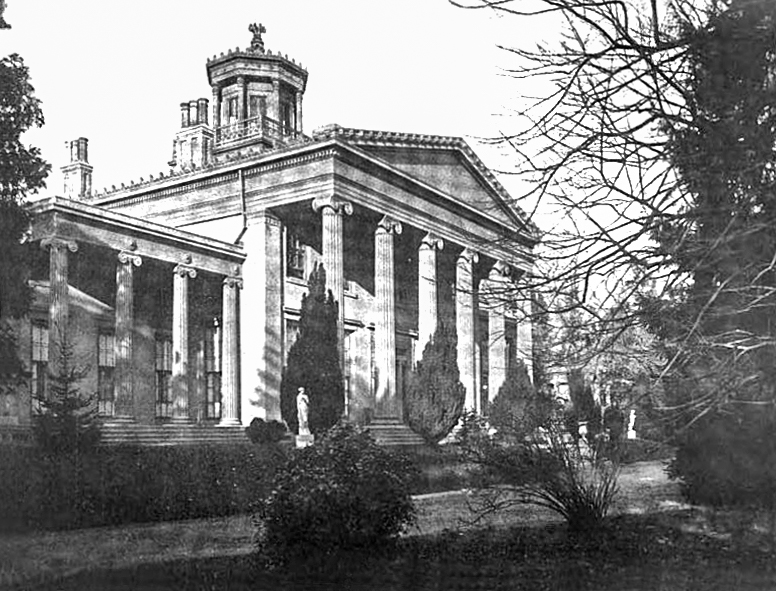
- A photograph of Phil-Ellena taken prior to its destruction in 1892.
- Interactive map of the Phil-Ellena area

General information
- Architectural style: Greek Revival
- Location: West Mount Airy, Philadelphia, United States
- Coordinates: 40.052784°N 75.187025°W
- Named for: Ellen (Douglas) Carpenter
- Opened: 1844
- Demolished: 1892
- Owner: George Washington Carpenter; Ellen Carpenter

Design and construction
- Architect: George Washington Carpenter
- Other designers: William L. Johnston, draftsperson
- Main contractor: N. Smedley

Phil-Ellena was the stately home of George Washington Carpenter in Germantown, Pennsylvania, now the West Mount Airy neighborhood of Philadelphia. The house was constructed in 1845 and demolished in 1892 during development of the Mount Airy neighborhood.

== History ==
In 1836 Carpenter purchased over 500 acres of land in Germantown. He subdivided some of the property, but on a 300-acre parcel near what is now the intersection of Germantown Avenue and Pelham Road he constructed his country estate known as Phil-Ellena. Named for his second wife, Ellen, the Greek Revival house was "one of the most noted homes in the country."

Carpenter, a noted scientist, built a Greek temple on the estate to house his collections of specimens. A greenhouse contained his botanical studies, and a 65-foot clock tower signaled the time.

After Carpenter's death in 1860, his second wife, Ellen, inherited the estate. When the estate was demolished in 1898, Carpenter's botanical collection was given to the Philadelphia Horticulture Center, and his museum specimens were transferred to the Academy of Natural Sciences of Philadelphia. The clock tower was demolished in 1902.

Visitors to Phil-Ellena included Thomas Nuttall and John James Audubon.

== East and West Phil Ellena Street and Pelham Road ==
Two segments of West Phil Ellena Street are included within the boundaries of the former estate, and Germantown Avenue separates West Phil Ellena Street from East Phil Ellena Street. Pelham was an alternative name for Carpenter's house, and Pelham Road runs through the former estate.

== National Register of Historic Places ==
Within the former boundaries of Phil-Ellena, sites listed on the National Register of Historic Places include the following:

- Daniel Billmeyer House
- Malvern Hall
- McCallum Manor
- Robert M. Hogue House
