= Nicola Monachesi =

Italian painter (1795–1851)

Nicola Monachesi (1795–1851) was an Italian painter believed to have painted the earliest frescos in the United States. He was born in Tolentino in the Marche region of Italy and was considered a citizen of Rome. He died in Philadelphia a naturalized citizen of the United States. In Italy, he was a pupil of the Accademia di San Luca, Rome, studying under Gaspare Landi, and winning his first painting prize. He emigrated to America in 1831–32, entering through New York and settling in Philadelphia. He worked mostly as an interior decorator, drawing neoclassical artistic paintings on wall surfaces and portrait paintings on canvas, decorating churches, commercial buildings, and mansions.

== Historical marker ==
In 2017, the Pennsylvania Historical and Museum Commission installed a historical marker on a sidewalk near the southeast corner of the St. Augustine Church, Philadelphia, in Center City. The marker was proposed by author and historian Celeste Anne Morello.

Its inscription reads: "Born and trained in Italy, this artist executed some of the first fresco paintings in America, beginning in the 1830s. His commissions decorated many grand homes, Catholic churches, and public buildings such as the Merchant’s Exchange Building on South 3rd St. The ceiling frescoes at St. Augustine Roman Catholic Church are a rare surviving example of his work. Monachesi became a US citizen and lived in Philadelphia until his death."

Its precise location is 39° 57.321′ N, 75° 8.776′ W., at the intersection of North 4th Street and North Marginal Road, on the right when traveling south on North 4th Street.

== Works ==
Works surviving and preserved are:

- St. Augustine Church, Philadelphia, Fresco paintings.
- Richard Alsop IV House in Connecticut (now owned by Wesleyan University), the interior decorative wall paintings are attributed to Monachesi. It is believed that his work in the Merchants' Exchange Building (Philadelphia) impressed the owner, who had an office in the Exchange and invited Monachesi to travel out of Philadelphia. The works highlighted are stair hall painting displays, in the style of trompe-l'œil of figures in niches, while oil-on-plaster paintings are featured in the parlors, dining room and morning room. The parlor paintings are classical derivations, and some subjects are Raphaelesque in origin. In the morning room, the formal classicism of the parlors is replaced by scenes derived from the "rural" Italian tradition of wall decoration. Local birds and insects are featured in these scenes. The dining room displays a painted frieze. These works exist today and are on display and preserved by the university.

Works demolished or destroyed:

- Merchants' Exchange Building (Philadelphia) was designed by architect William Strickland. The interior of the exchange room, with wall paintings, ceiling fresco, and an elegant mosaic floor, was executed in the 1830s, and the artwork was removed later during a building renovation.
- St. John the Evangelist Catholic Church (Philadelphia, Pennsylvania) at 13th and Chestnut Streets. Interior paintings in the 1830s at the then-cathedral of the Diocese of Philadelphia. The church and interior were destroyed by fire in 1899.
- Matthew Newkirk's mansion residence at 13th and Arch Street, Philadelphia, was designed by architect Thomas Ustick Walter. Interior decorative paintings and marble in 1834. The decorations were carefully preserved until 1876, when they were sold to the St. George Society of Philadelphia and renamed "St. George's Hall". The building was demolished in 1903.
- ,Phil-Ellena the stately mansion of George Washington Carpenter, is located in Germantown, Pennsylvania, now the West Mount Airy neighborhood of Philadelphia. Interior decorative paintings reflective of Ralphel's paintings in Rome's Vatican, executed in over 20 rooms. The Greek Revival styled mansion was sited on 600 acres, constructed in 1845 and demolished in 1892 during the development of the Mount Airy neighborhood.
- Confectioner's George Parkinson and his wife Eleanor Parkinson shop at 180 Chestnut Street, Philadelphia. Interior decorative ceiling paintings in 1840. The owners had created a confectionery business that made Philadelphia vanilla ice cream a synonym for the city's haute cuisine. Their son James opened a restaurant in the early 1840s with an ice cream garden in the rear of the store. The wonderful marble mosaic floor and artwork were considered a "glorious painting" as a marriage of Jupiter and Juno and brought a par excellence of refinement to creating a place that both men and women could socialize (compared to and departure to Taverns). Demolition date unknown.

Works of unknown status: His portraits were in many "old" established families in Philadelphia and the vicinity. They included patrons such as Stephen Girard, Madam Rush, Joseph Bonaparte, and Joseph Togno. In 1841–42, his large historical picture, The Murder of Jane McCrea, was exhibited in Philadelphia. The Pennsylvania Academy of the Fine Arts held an exhibit of his work.

Works of art gallery: Preserved frescoes painted by the Italian artist Nicola Monachesi (1795–1851) are best displayed at St. Augustine Church, Philadelphia. The center of the church's ceiling is occupied by his painting representing the ascent of St. Augustine into Heaven. Augustine is depicted with an older face and a thick white beard that descends from his face, and dressed in the black tunic of the Augustinian monks. He is placed on a cushion of clouds in the middle with a chorus of angels at the feet of the Virgin holding the Baby Jesus in her arms. Above in his ascent is boldly highlighted with an intense light from the Trinity, symbolized by an equilateral triangle. Other paintings in the Church are also considered his works of art and decoration.

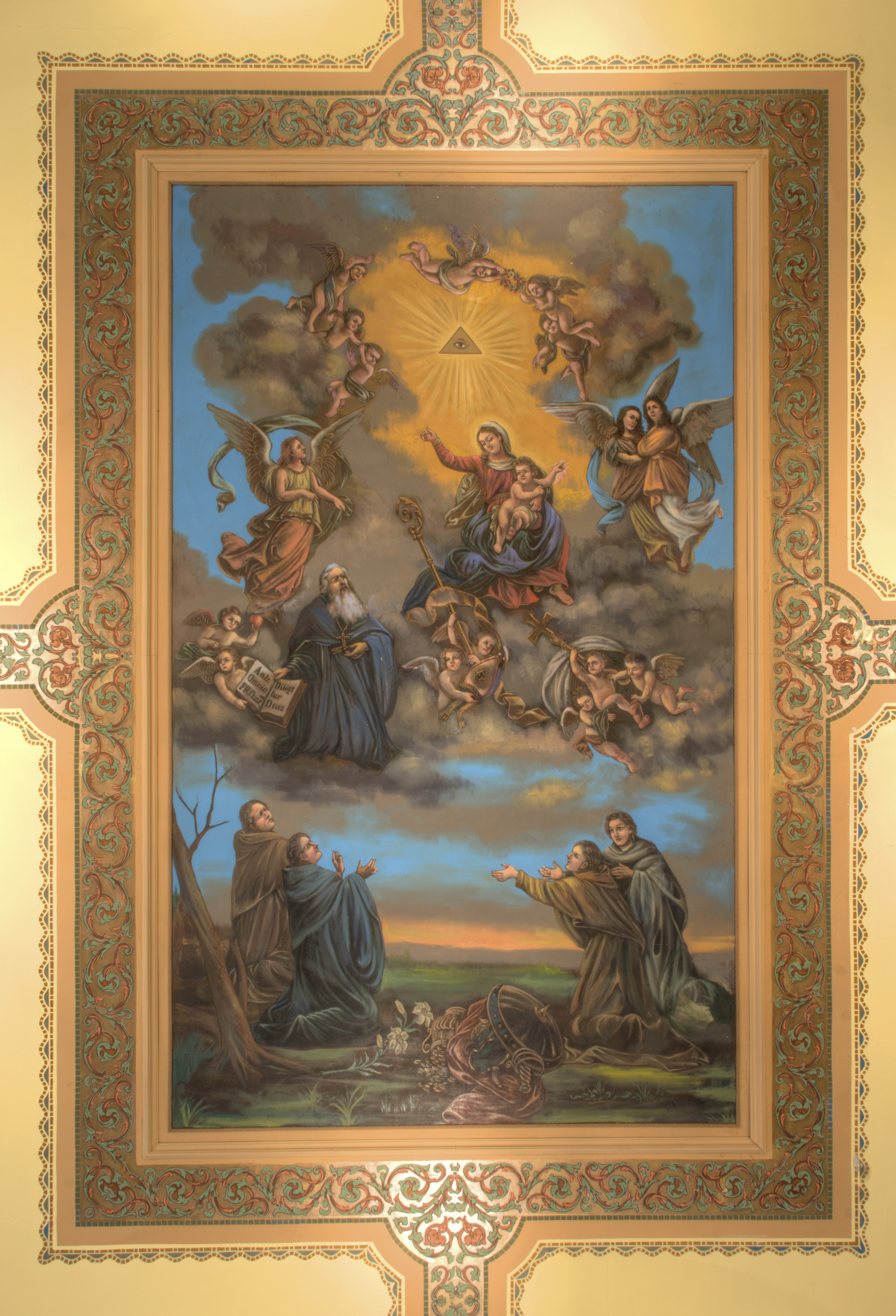
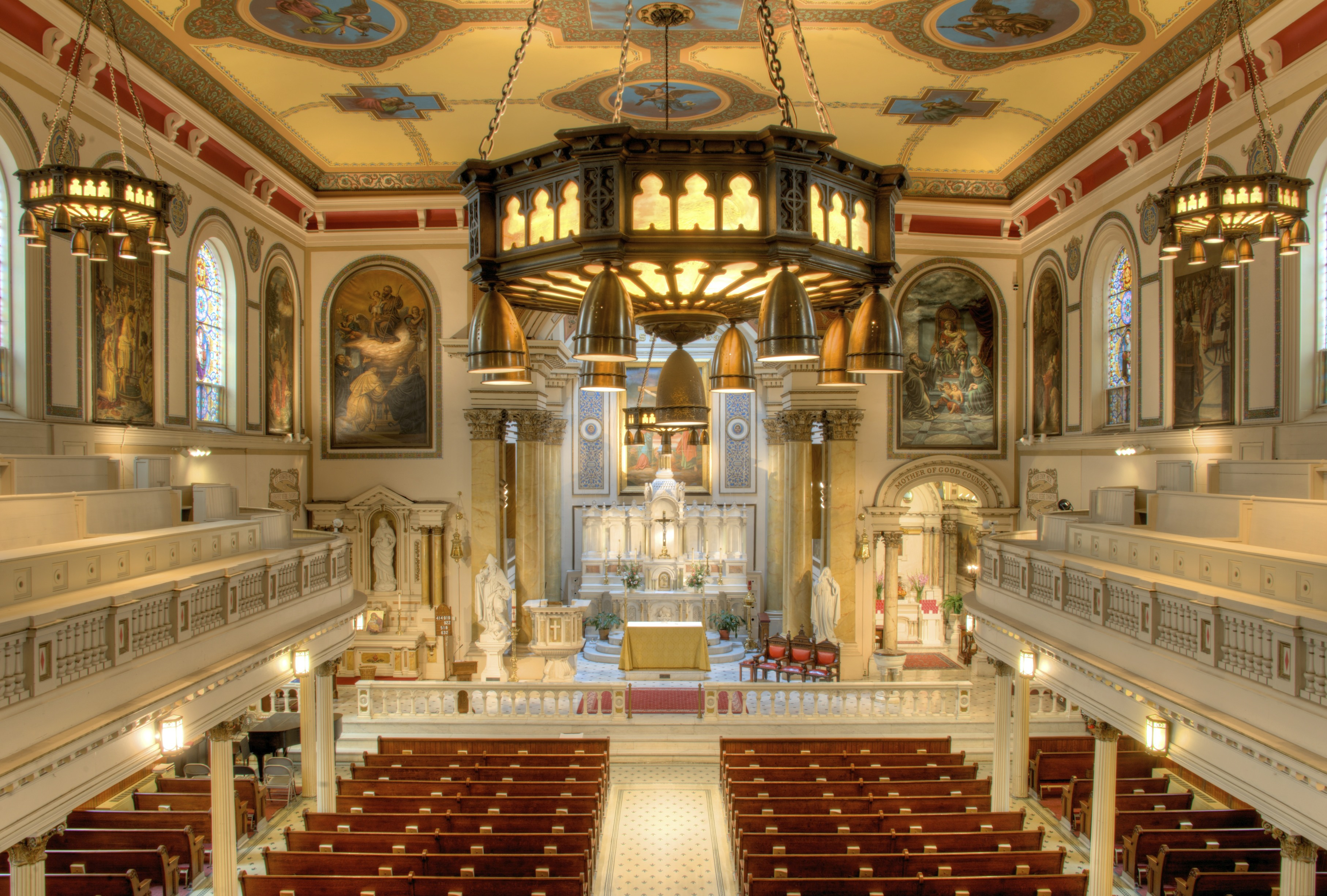
