= The Philadelphia Independent =

The Philadelphia Independent may refer to:

- The Philadelphia Independent (1931–1971), weekly African-American newspaper
- The Philadelphia Independent (2002–2005), bimonthly general-interest newspaper
