= William L. Johnston =

American architect

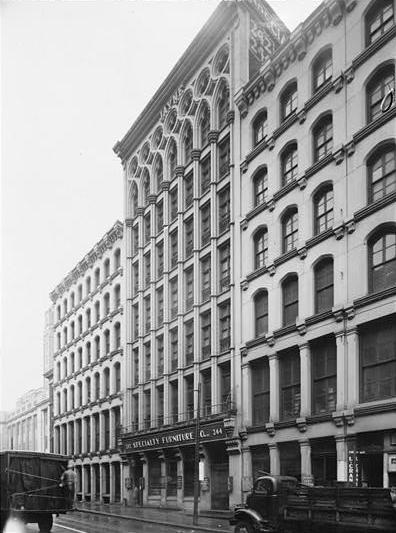
Jayne Building, 242-44 Chestnut Sts., Philadelphia, PA (1849-50, demolished 1957).

William L. Johnston (1811–1849) was a carpenter-architect who taught architectural drawing at the Carpenters' Company of Philadelphia, and won a number of important Philadelphia commissions. He died of tuberculosis at the age of 38 after a trip abroad for his health.

== Philadelphia buildings ==
- Phil-Ellena (George Washington Carpenter mansion), Germantown, Philadelphia, PA (1844, demolished 1898). This mammoth Greek-Revival mansion on a 500-acre (2.0 km^{2}) estate was the largest private residence in Philadelphia.
- Mercantile Library (Burroughs Building), 125 S. 5th St., Philadelphia, PA (1844–45, demolished 1925).
- Bank of Commerce, 211 Chestnut St., Philadelphia, PA (c. 1846, demolished).

BANK OF COMMERCE, formerly the Moyamensing Bank. Incorporated in the year 1832, with a capital of $250,000. The present banking-house of this institution, located in Chestnut west of Second Street, is constructed of brown stone. In the design of this building, the architect, the late Mr. JOHNSTON, has evidently studied utility more than display; yet the genius of the true artist manifests itself throughout, and few of our public buildings of this order, surpass it as an imposing piece of architecture.

- Central Presbyterian Church, 832–836 Lombard St., Philadelphia, PA (1848). Founded by Rev. Stephen H. Gloucester, a former slave, this was the first black Presbyterian church in Philadelphia. The congregation moved to West Philadelphia in 1939, and the building is now a private residence.
- Entrance Gate to Hood Cemetery (aka Lower Burying Ground), 4901 Germantown Ave., Germantown, Philadelphia, PA (1849).
- Jayne Building, 242–44 Chestnut St., Philadelphia, PA (1849–50, demolished 1957) (completed by Thomas U. Walter). Charles E. Peterson argued that Johnston's 129-foot-tall (39 m) building was a proto-skyscraper, and influenced the Chicago architect Louis Sullivan, who worked directly across the street from it in the office of Frank Furness. Peterson's efforts to save the building were unsuccessful; it was demolished in 1957 in the creation of Independence National Historical Park.

== Other buildings ==
In addition to his Philadelphia buildings, Johnston was commissioned in 1847 to design the Orange Grove Plantation House in Plaquemines Parish, Louisiana. Intended for Thomas A. Morgan, a descendant of the prominent Morgan family of Pennsylvania, the house was the last Gothic Revival mansion built in antebellum Louisiana. It featured Tudor elements and meticulous hand-crafted details that were built in Philadelphia and transported to Louisiana to be assembled there.

== Gallery ==
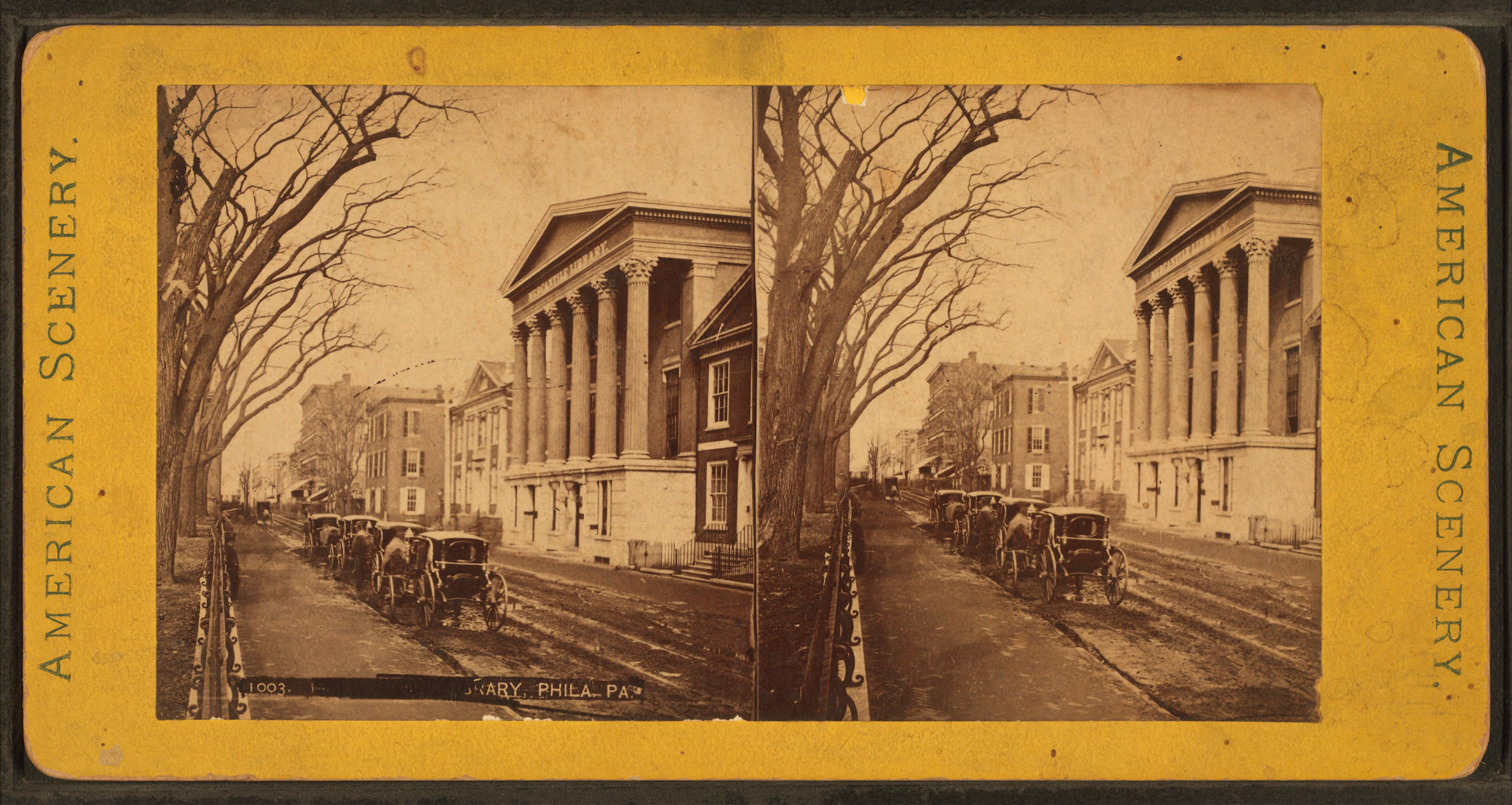
Mercantile Library, Philadelphia, PA (1844–45, demolished 1925)

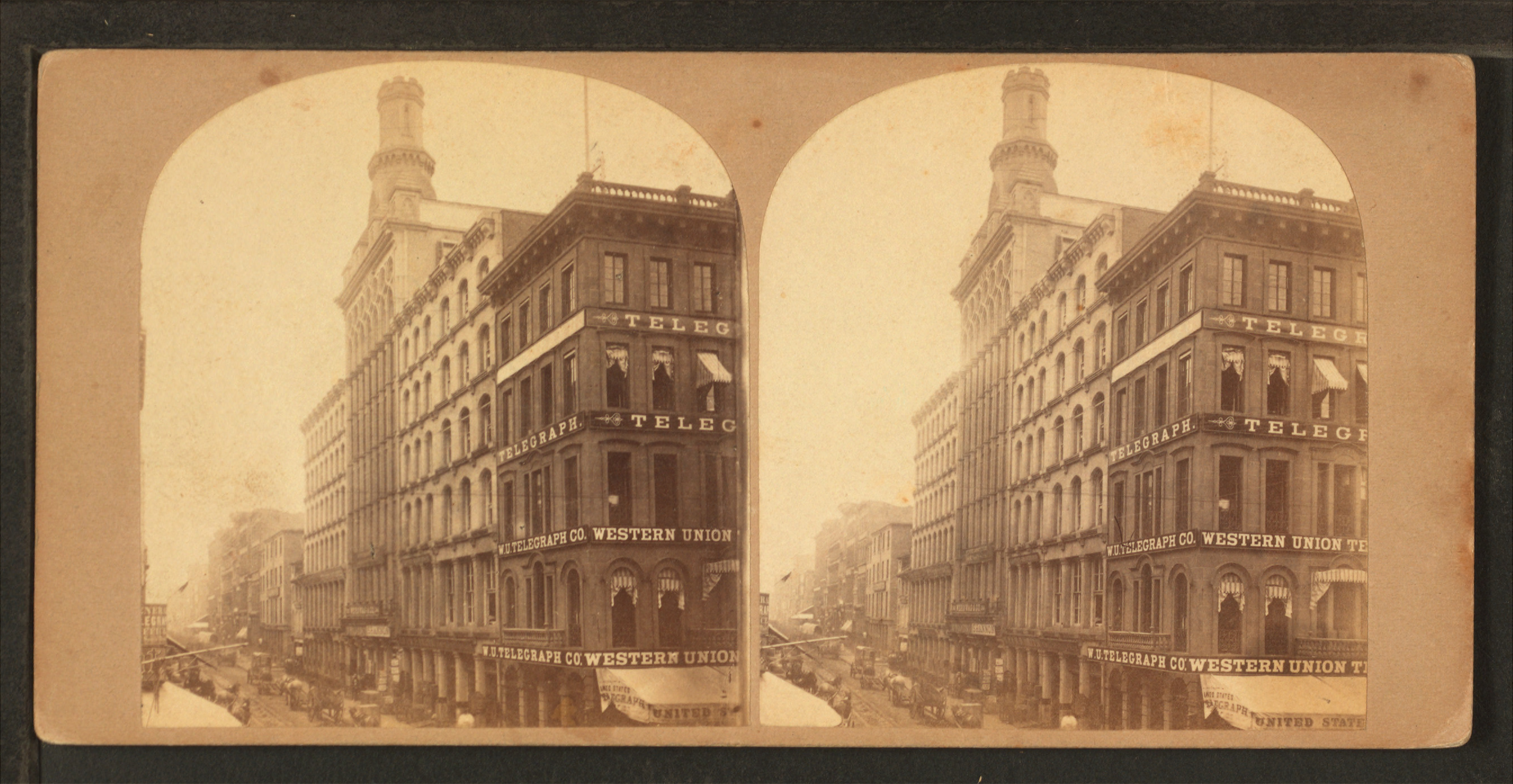
Jayne Building (tower burned 1872), Philadelphia, PA (1849–50, demolished 1957)

== Publications ==
William Johnson Architect published with Peter Nicholson the Thirteenth Edition of The Carpenter's New Guide Being a Complete Book of Lines for Carpentry and Joinery; Grigg, Elliot and Co., Philadelphia, 1848. The printers were T. K. and P. G. Collins, Printers of Philadelphia. The book is listed as number 835 in Henry-Russell Hitchcock's American Architectural Books published in American before 1895.
