= Mount Airy, Philadelphia =

Neighborhood of Philadelphia

Mount Airy
- Neighborhood of Philadelphia
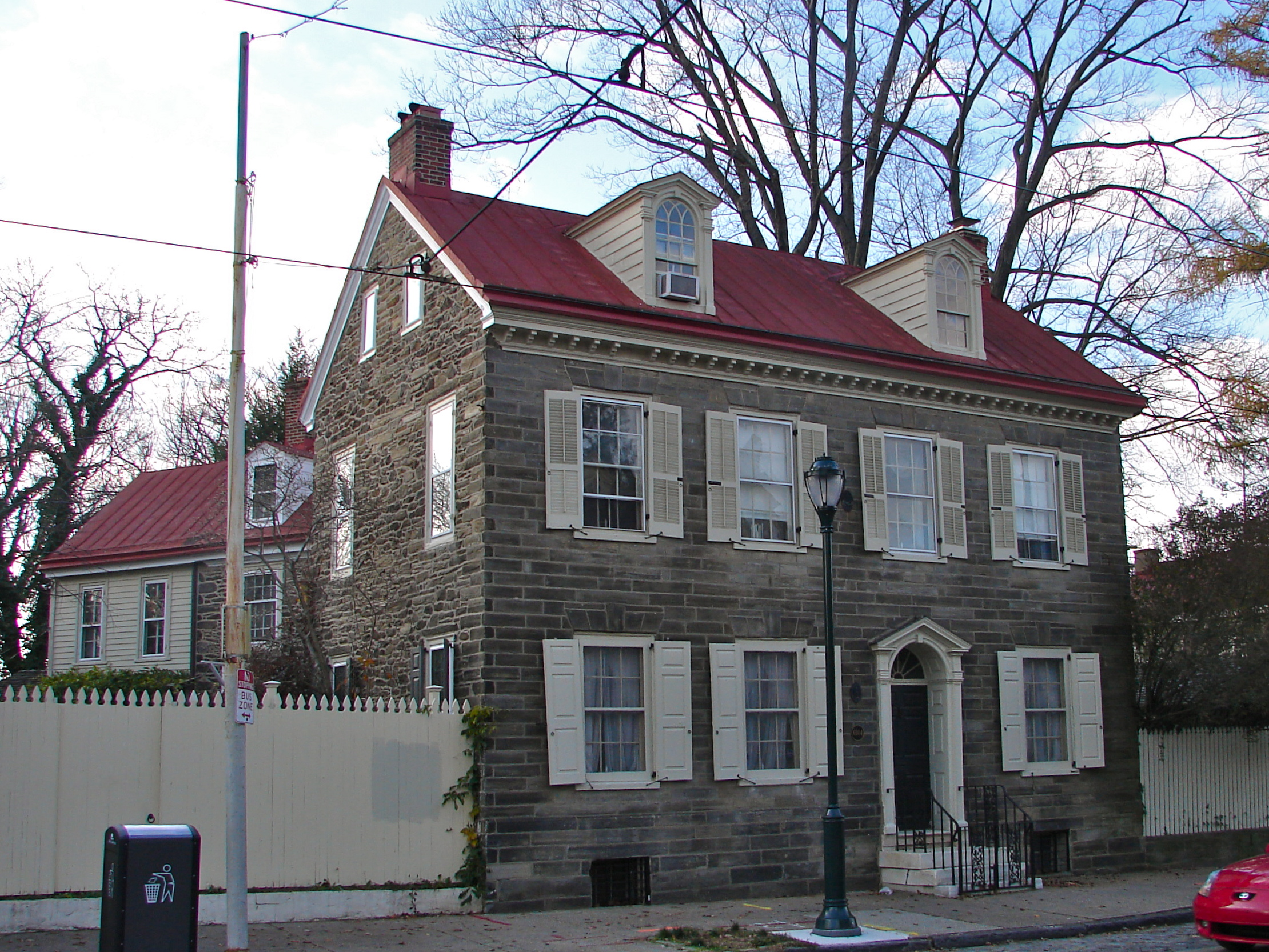
- Daniel Billmeyer House on Germantown Avenue

- Location within Philadelphia
- Coordinates: 40°03′58″N 75°11′02″W
- Country: United States
- State: Pennsylvania
- County: Philadelphia County
- City: Philadelphia
- ZIP Code: 19119, 19150
- Area codes: 215, 267, and 445

Mount Airy is a neighborhood of Northwest Philadelphia in the U.S. state of Pennsylvania.

== Geography ==
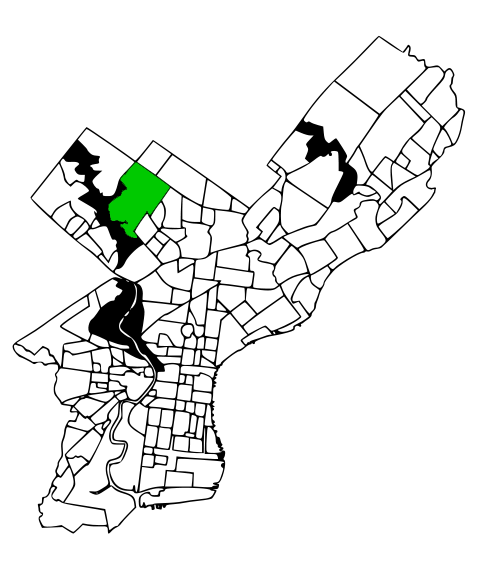
Map of Philadelphia highlighting the Mount Airy neighborhood

Mount Airy is bounded on the northwest by the Cresheim Valley, which is part of Fairmount Park. Beyond this lies Chestnut Hill. On the west side is the Wissahickon Gorge, which is also part of Fairmount Park, beyond which lies Roxborough and Manayunk. Germantown borders the southeast of Mount Airy.

The 19119 ZIP code is almost entirely coterminous with the cultural-consensus boundaries of Mount Airy.

There is no official boundary between Mount Airy and Germantown. The most common consensus is that Johnson Street is the de facto boundary; however, the West Mount Airy Neighbors and East Mount Airy Neighbors organizations consider Washington Lane to be Mount Airy's southern edge. The question is moot, however, as the two neighborhoods blend together very gradually. Historically, the entire area was part of the German Township. Many buildings in Mount Airy carry the identity and even the name of Germantown in one way or another. For example, the Unitarian Society of Germantown, the Germantown Jewish Centre, the Germantown Christian Assembly, and the Germantown Montessori School are all in Mount Airy, yet also belong culturally to Germantown. Parts of the Battle of Germantown in 1777 occurred throughout what is now Mount Airy. The special relationship linking the two has its roots in the time before the Act of Consolidation, when Germantown was a borough separate from the City of Philadelphia, and its rural environs were what is now Mount Airy.

== History ==
William Allen, a prominent Philadelphia merchant and Chief Justice of the Province of Pennsylvania, created his summer estate and mansion on Germantown Avenue at Allens Lane in 1750, and the area eventually took the building's name, Mount Airy, as its own. Before this, the area which makes up the modern neighborhood of Mount Airy was part of two sections of the original Germantown Township (which covered all of Germantown, Mount Airy, and Chestnut Hill), Cresheim and Beggarstown.

The village or Dorfshaft of Krisheim (also known as Cresheim) has its origins in the original land divisions of Germantown Township in 1689. It was a section of the township that was allotted to a group of original Germantown settlers who acquired rights to land either directly or indirectly from William Penn. It covered the area from Stenton to Wissahickon Avenues and from Mermaid Lane to roughly Sedgwick Street. The name is derived from a town known today as Kriegsheim in the Palatine in Germany which was the hometown of a few German Quaker families who had settled in Germantown in the 1680s. Throughout much of the 18th century, this area of Germantown Township was known in the land and tax records as simply Cresheim or Cresham. It was at the beginning of the 19th century that the name Mount Airy began to replace Cresheim.

Beggarstown (also Beggars-town or Beggar Town), an area centered along Germantown Avenue between Gorgas Lane and Cliveden Street, was formed out of the so-called "Sidelands" of Germantown. The Sidelands were a section of Germantown Township that had been set aside so that the owners of lots in the center of Germantown could have access to an equal share of land in the entire village of Germantown section of Germantown Township. The portion from which Beggarstown grew covered the area from Upsal Street to roughly Sedgwick Street, Stenton Avenue, and Wissahickon Avenue. As the Germantown village filled up, settlers began to move northwest along Germantown Avenue. By the 1730s and 1740s, the Sidelands area was subdivided into smaller house lots. An account published in 1770 states that the area received its name as a result of its first resident's begging for money to build his house, which later became the home of the Germantown Church of the Brethren. The name for this area disappeared by the late 19th century, and it was sometimes called Pelham, Germantown, or Mount Airy.

Much of modern Mount Airy was developed in the late 19th and early 20th centuries, spreading out from Germantown Avenue and two railroad lines. Large three-story, gray-stone Victorian, colonial revival, and Norman and Cotswold-style houses and mansions, with stained glass windows and slate roofs, are situated on many of the area's tree-lined streets. They dominated districts like West Mount Airy's Pelham section (a Wendell and Smith development from the 1890s), East Mount Airy's Gowen Avenue (the James Gowen Estate development from the 1880s), Sedgwick Farms (an Ashton S. Tourison development from 1905), and Stenton (a Frank Mauran development from 1905) areas.

== Demographics ==
As of the U.S. Census Bureau 2021 American Community Survey, the 19119 which encompasses Mount Airy had 29,206 residents.

Of those residents, 57.4% were Black or African-American, 33.2% White/Caucasian, 2.8% Hispanic, 1.3% Asian, and 5.3% were from other races or from 2 or more races.

There were 12,564 households. 50.5% of households were married couples living together, 21.2% had a female householder, 7.2% had a male householder, and 21.1% were non-families. The average household size was 2.3.

Of Mount Airy's residents, 19.5% were under the age of 18 and 19% were 65 years and over. The median age was 42 years. 54.4% of residents were female. 45.6% of residents were male.

The median household income was $72,685 and the per capita income was $48,997.

=== Racial integration ===
The area is recognized by many civil rights groups as one of the first successfully integrated neighborhoods in America. Mount Airy residents organized to resist blockbusting, panic selling, and redlining, especially during the period from the late 1950s to the early 1970s when those practices were prevalent. It continues to be a well-blended neighborhood and was cited in Oprah Winfrey's O magazine for its racial diversity and neighborhood appeal. The community has also been recognized by U.S. News & World Report for racial harmony and balance.

== Education ==
=== Primary and secondary schools ===
The School District of Philadelphia operates area public schools. Zoned K–5 schools serving sections of Mt. Airy include the Eleanor C. Emlen School. Zoned K–8 schools serving sections of Mt. Airy include Charles W. Henry School, Henry H. Houston School, and the Anna L. Lingelbach School. Residents assigned to Henry, Houston, and/or Lingelbach are also zoned to Roxborough High School; they were previously zoned to Germantown High School. Other nearby schools include Academy for the Middle Years, Parkway High School, and Martin Luther King High School.

West Oak Lane Charter School and Wissahickon Charter School are two Mt. Airy area K–8 charter schools. Charter schools in nearby Germantown include Imani Education Circle Charter School (K–8), Germantown Settlement Charter School (5–8), Renaissance Charter School (6–8), and Delaware Valley Charter High School (9–12).

Private schools in Mount Airy include Blair Christian Academy (PreK–12), Revival Hill Christian High School (9–12), Islamic Day School of Philadelphia (PreK–5), Waldorf School of Philadelphia (PreK–8), Project Learn School (K–8), Classroom on Carpenter Lane (K–2), and Holy Cross School (K–8), a parochial school. Private schools in nearby Germantown include the Green Tree School (special education, ages 6–21), Germantown Friends School (K–-12), William Penn Charter School (K–12), Greene Street Friends School (K–8), and the Pennsylvania School for the Deaf (ages 3–17).

=== Colleges and universities ===
Universities and colleges close to Mount Airy include Arcadia University, Chestnut Hill College, La Salle University, The Lutheran Theological Seminary at Philadelphia, Thomas Jefferson University, and Saint Joseph's University.

=== Public libraries ===
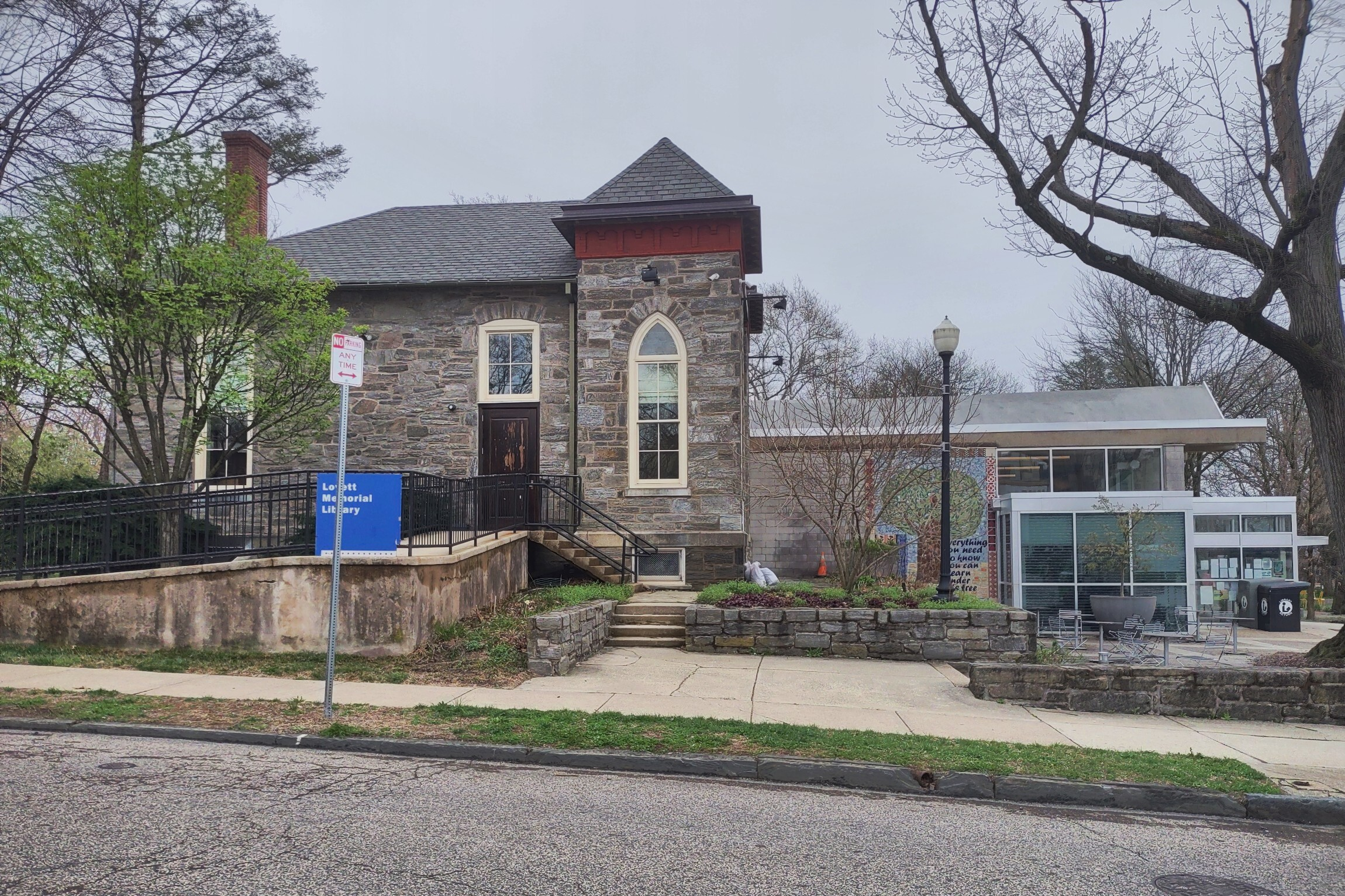
Lovett Memorial Branch Library, FLP

Free Library of Philadelphia operates the Lovett Square Branch at 6945 Germantown Avenue.

== Transportation ==
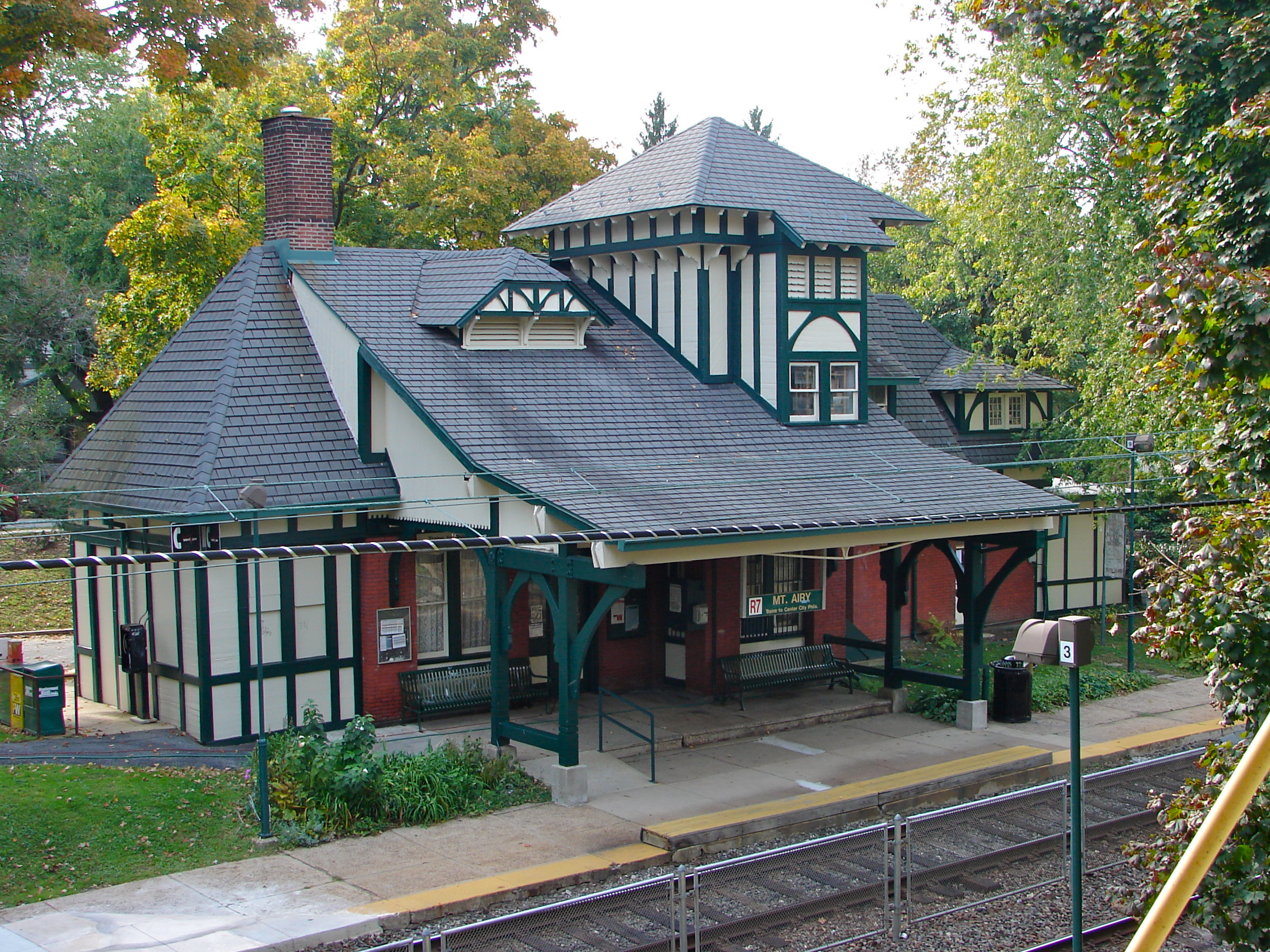
Mount Airy station on Chestnut Hill East Line is listed on the National Register of Historic Places

Two SEPTA Regional Rail lines connect the neighborhood to Center City. The Chestnut Hill West Line runs through West Mount Airy with stops at Upsal, Carpenter, and Allen Lane stations and the Chestnut Hill East Line runs through East Mount Airy with stops at Mount Airy, Sedgwick, and Stenton stations.

The neighborhood is also served by bus routes 18, 23 (formerly a trolley line), 53 (formerly a trolley line), 51, and 71.

== Culture and community ==
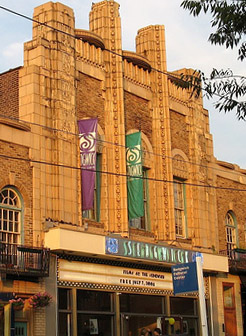
Sedgwick Theater in Mount Airy, a 1920s Art Deco movie theatre

In 2011, The New York Times described the influx of new businesses to Mount Airy as a "cultural revival" buoyed by "the neighborhood's reasonable housing costs and relatively safe streets." In 2013, CNNMoney named Mount Airy one of America's top ten best big-city neighborhoods.

The political tone of the neighborhood is predominantly progressive. One prominent Mount Airy politician is former Republican mayoral candidate Sam Katz.

There are three Jewish congregations in Mount Airy (Germantown Jewish Centre, P'nai Or Jewish Renewal Congregation of Philadelphia, and Chabad-Lubovitch of Northwest Philadelphia) and the national office of the Jewish organization The Shalom Center.

A Hare Krishna community is located on West Allens Lane.

Mount Airy's main commercial district lies along stone-paved Germantown Avenue, which also serves as the boundary between East and West Mount Airy. The neighborhood has a variety of independent shops, restaurants, art galleries, clothing stores, coffee shops, a gastropub, wine bar, fitness centers, and professional offices. Mt. Airy also has two tented farmers' markets. The Sedgwick Theater, notable for its art deco style, has been a cultural center in the past, and now houses the Quintessence Theatre Group.

The Weavers Way Co-op, a long-running co-op grocery store in West Mount Airy, also manages two working farms, works with local schools, and provides fresh food to a shelter.

In 2006, Mt. Airy was recognized by local government and movement leaders as having a significant number of lesbian households, similarly to how views were contemporaneously changing regarding the East Passyunk Crossing neighborhood, as it was dubbed by some as Philadelphia's "New Gayborhood" by around the same time period.

== Notable people ==
- Sadie Tanner Mossell Alexander, first African American woman Ph.D. from University of Pennsylvania and Truman administration official
- Mark Baltin, linguist, professor of linguistics at New York University
- Eric Bazilian, musician
- Noah "Xaphoon Jones" Beresin, musician half of hip hop group Chiddy Bang
- Jesse Biddle, baseball player
- Sandra Boynton, cartoonist and children's book author
- Dan Bricklin, inventor and entrepreneur
- David L. Cohen, lawyer, Comcast executive, Chief of Staff to Mayor Ed Rendell from 1992 to 1997
- Linda Creed, lyricist and partner with Thom Bell, credited with co-writing many hits known as the "Philly Sound"
- Charles Darrow, Developer of the board game Monopoly
- Joel Fagliano, puzzle creator, Author of the New York Times "Mini Crosswords"
- Emma Garrett, educator of the deaf
- Elizabeth Shippen Green, artist and illustrator
- John Wesley Harding (Wesley Stace), singer-songwriter and novelist.
- A. Leon Higginbotham Jr., the first African American judge on the United States District Court for the Eastern District of Pennsylvania
- Amy Ignatow, author and illustrator of The Popularity Papers series
- Khan Jamal, jazz musician
- Mat Johnson, author and playwright
- Jack Jones, first African-American news anchor in the Philadelphia market
- Connie Mack, baseball manager and owner
- John McWhorter, linguist and political commentator
- Violet Oakley, artist
- Eric Owens, operatic bass-baritone
- Holly Robinson Peete, entertainer
- Saul Perlmutter, Nobel Prize-winning astrophysicist
- Louis H. Pollak (1922-2012), federal judge and dean of Yale Law School and the University of Pennsylvania Law School
- Kurt Rosenwinkel, jazz guitarist
- Bob Saget, actor and television host
- Santigold, hip-hop musician
- Zalman Schachter-Shalomi, Jewish religious leader
- Denise Scott Brown, architect
- Jessie Willcox Smith, illustrator and artist
- Brianna Taylor, reality TV star, The Real World: Hollywood
- Howard Martin Temin, Nobel Prize-winning geneticist and virologist
- Paul F. Tompkins, comedian, TV host, and podcaster
- C. Delores Tucker, civil rights activist; first black female Secretary of State of a U.S. state in the nation
- Robert Venturi, architect
- Kurt Vile, indie rock musician
- Grover Washington Jr., jazz musician

== Notable institutions ==
- The Lutheran Theological Seminary at Philadelphia (LTSP) is located at Germantown Avenue and Allens Lane. The seminary is associated with the Evangelical Lutheran Church in America, the largest Lutheran denomination in the U.S., and also serves as its Region 7 headquarters.
- The Sedgwick Theater, a 1920s Art Deco movie theater, is one of the few remaining in Philadelphia.
- Mount Airy is home to numerous properties listed on the National Register of Historic Places as well as sharing the Colonial Germantown Historic District with neighboring Germantown. Listings include: the Violet Oakley Studio, Nugent Home for Baptists, Mt. Airy Station, Malvern Hall, Eleanor Cope Emlen School of Practice, Presser Home for Retired Music Teachers, Cliveden, Upsala, Beggarstown School, Michael Billmeyer House, Daniel Billmeyer House, Grace Church, Mt. Airy, Henry H. Houston School, Robert M. Hogue House, Charles Wolcott Henry School, Edward B. Seymour House, and McCallum Manor.
