= Popularity Papers =

Canadian television series

- Genre: Comedy
- Created by: Vivian Lin; Amanda Brooke Perrin
- Based on: The Popularity Papers by Amy Ignatow
- Starring: Glee Dango; Mia Bella; Michael Chan; Christopher Jacot; Naomi Snieckus; Millie Davis; Jenna Weir; Callum Shoniker; Anna Mirodin; Seth Murchison; Lyla Elliott; Keegan Hedley; Chris River; Pierre Drivas; Dave Barclay
- Country of origin: Canada
- Original language: English
- No. of seasons: 1
- No. of episodes: 26

Production
- Producer: BBC Studios
- Running time: 22 minutes
- Production companies: BBC Studios; Aircraft Pictures; Corus Entertainment

Original release
- Network: YTV
- Release: April 10, 2023 – 2024

Popularity Papers is a British-Canadian youth comedy television series, which premiered in 2023 on YTV and produced by BBC Studios Kids & Family Adapted from Amy Ignatow's middle-grade novel series The Popularity Papers, the series stars Glee Dango and Mia Bella as Julie Graham-Chang and Lydia Goldblatt, two young friends who are trying to discover the secret to being popular as they start junior high school.

The cast also includes Michael Chan, Christopher Jacot, Naomi Snieckus, Millie Davis, Jenna Weir, Callum Shoniker, Anna Mirodin, Seth Murchison, Lyla Elliott, Keegan Hedley, Chris River, Pierre Drivas and Dave Barclay.

The series was created by Vivian Lin and Amanda Brooke Perrin for Aircraft Pictures and Corus Entertainment.

== Episodes ==
No.	Title	Directed by	Written by	Original release date
1	"New School, New Start"	Stefan Brogren	Vivian Lin, Amanda Brooke Perrin	April 10, 2023
2	"Teamwork Makes the Scene Work"	Allana Harkin	Maryan Haye, Vivian Lin	April 17, 2023
3	"My Art Will Go On"	Stefan Brogren	Jeff Detsky, Wendy Litner	April 24, 2023
4	"Hike a Pose"	Justin Wu	Amanda Brooke Perrin	May 1, 2023
5	"Smells Like Tween Spirit"	Stefan Brogren	Wendy Litner	May 8, 2023
6	"Tears of a Class Clown"	Stefan Brogren	Jeff Detsky	May 15, 2023
7	"Middle School of Rock"	Stefan Brogren	Sara Hennessey	May 22, 2023
8	"Trendship Never Ends"	Sarah Glinski	Maryan Haye	May 29, 2023
9	"Ghost Mortem"	Unknown	Evan Thaler Hickey	October 22, 2023
10	"Freaks and Cliques"	Justin Wu	Wendy Litner	October 29, 2023
11	"Balm Squad"	Sarah Glinski	Shelley Scarrow	November 5, 2023
12	"Friends in Junior High Places"	Nicole Stamp	Shelley Scarrow	November 12, 2023
13	"Pain in the Bat Mitzvah"	Allana Harkin	Jeff Detsky	November 19, 2023
14	"The Athenian Candidate"	Nicole Stamp	Jeff Detsky	November 27, 2023
15	"Peer Review"	TBD	Vivian Lin	2024
16	"We Gonna Party Like It's Your Earth Day"	TBD	Nelu Handa	2024
17	"Personality Test"	Romeo Candido	Vivian Lin	2024
18	"Skate Expectations"	TBD	Jeff Detsky	2024
19	"Prides-Maids"	Nicole Stamp	Daniel Fernandes	2024
20	"Livin' On a Dare"	TBD	Brandon Hackett	2024
21	"A Very Middle School"	TBD	Vivian Lin	2024
22	"Odds Squads"	Nicole Stamp	Kyah Green, Vivian Lin	2024
23	"Notes on a Vandal"	TBD	Brandon Hackett	2024
24	"Let's Sick Together"	Romeo Candido	JP Larocque, Vivian Lin	2024
25	"The Wonderful World of Mapleview, Pt. 1"	TBD	Maryan Haye, Vivian Lin	2024
26	"The Wonderful World of Mapleview, Pt. 2"	Stefan Brogren	Vivian Lin	2024

== Awards ==
Award	Date of ceremony	Category	Recipient(s)	Result	Ref(s)
Canadian Screen Awards	May 2023	Lead performance in a children's or youth program or series	Mia Bella	Nominated	
Canadian Screen Awards	May 2023	Lead performance in a children's or youth program or series	Glee Dango	Nominated	
Canadian Screen Awards	May 2023	Supporting performance in a children's or youth program or series	Millie Davis	Won	
Canadian Screen Awards	May 2023	Editing in a children's or youth program or series	Mike Reisacher "New School, New Start"	Nominated	
Canadian Screen Awards	May 2023	Writing in a children's or youth program or series	Vivian Lin, Maryan Haye "Teamwork Makes the Scene Work"	Nominated	
Canadian Screen Awards	May 2023	Writing in a children's or youth program or series	Vivian Lin, Amanda Brooke Perrin "New School, New Start"	Nominated	
