= Mark Baltin =

American linguist

Mark Reuben Baltin (1950 – 2024) was an American linguist and member of the faculty of New York University. Originally from the Mount Airy section of Philadelphia, he attended Central High School. He received his BA in Linguistics in 1971 at McGill University, his MA in 1975 at the University of Pennsylvania and his PhD in Linguistics in 1978 at the Massachusetts Institute of Technology.

Baltin has written on many topics in generative grammar, including movement, antecedent-contained deletion, ellipsis, lexical representation and phrase structure. His 1982 paper "A Landing Site Theory of Movement Rules" was influential in restricting the kinds of rules that are to be admitted in grammars.

Baltin died in 2024.
