= Keswick Theatre =

Theatre and music venue in Keswick Village, Glenside, Pennsylvania

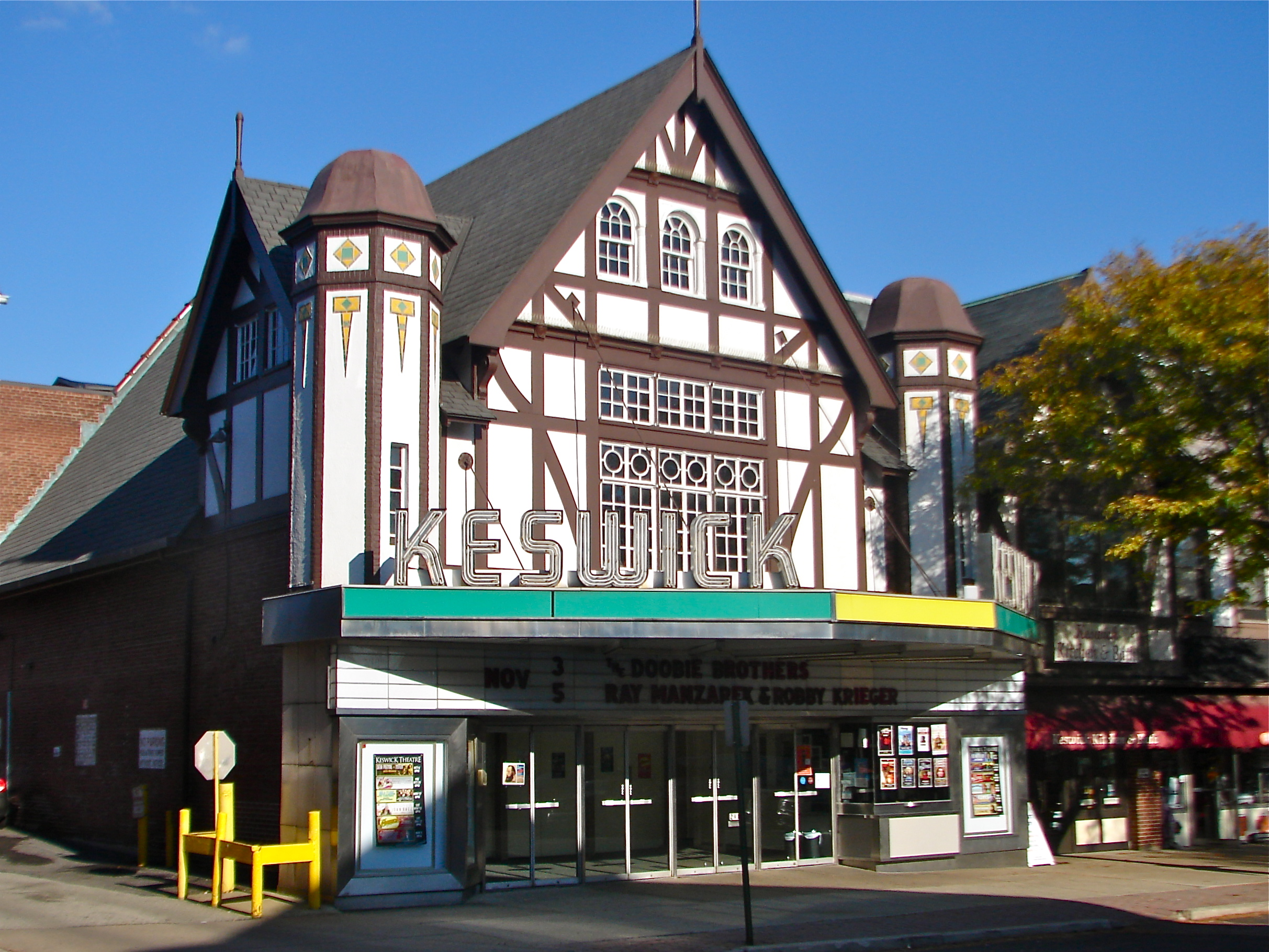
- Keswick Theatre from Keswick Avenue

- Location within Philadelphia Location within Pennsylvania Location within the United States
- Address: 291 Keswick Avenue; Glenside, Pennsylvania; United States
- Coordinates: 40°6′23″N 75°8′51″W
- Owner: AEG Live
- Capacity: 1,300
- Type: Theatre
- Events: music, concerts

Construction
- Opened: December 24, 1928 as a vaudeville/movie house 1981 Re-opened; March 1988 Re-opened
- Renovated: 1955 as a cinemascope film house March 1988
- Closed: 1980; December 1985
- Architect: Horace Trumbauer

Website
- www.keswicktheatre.com
- Keswick Theatre
- U.S. National Register of Historic Places
- Built: 1928
- Architect: Horace Trumbauer
- Architectural style: Tudor Revival
- NRHP reference No.: 83002263
- Added to NRHP: June 30, 1983

The Keswick Theatre is a theater in the Keswick Village section of Glenside, Pennsylvania, a suburb of Philadelphia. Horace Trumbauer designed the exterior in the Tudor Revival Style, which has remained essentially unaltered. When opened it had 1,366 seats.

The first performance was on Christmas Day in 1928 in a private event held for the Kiwanis Club. The Keswick Theatre opened to the public on December 27 with vaudeville and the film Glorious Betsy. Shot as a silent film with some speaking sequences, the Keswick showed a silent version as the sound equipment was not yet ready. In 1955 the theatre was renovated to show CinemaScope films.

The theatre operated until 1980. After closing it was threatened with demolition until a community group formed to re-open it as a live performance venue. During this period the Keswick presented performances by Fred Waring and the Young Pennsylvanians and the Preservation Hall Jazz Band. The venue also hosted performances by Theodore Bikel, Lionel Hampton, Carlos Montoya and Roberta Peters. The theater closed again in 1985 and reopened in 1988 under private ownership. The new owners established a restoration fund for repairs, restoration, and equipment upgrades. The theatre has been described as "acoustically luscious" and was fully restored by 1994.

It was added to the National Register of Historic Places in 1983. It has been owned by AEG Live since 2008.

== Organ ==
Originally the Keswick had an Aeolian-Votey pipe organ (Opus 1689) which was installed with a wide array of percussion traps for the accompaniment of silent films. The fate of the original organ is unknown. In 1987 the Möller organ (Opus 5230) from the Sedgwick Theater was installed in the Keswick. When the Sedgwick closed as a cinema in 1966 the organ was removed and placed in storage.
