= Presser Home for Retired Music Teachers =

- U.S. National Register of Historic Places
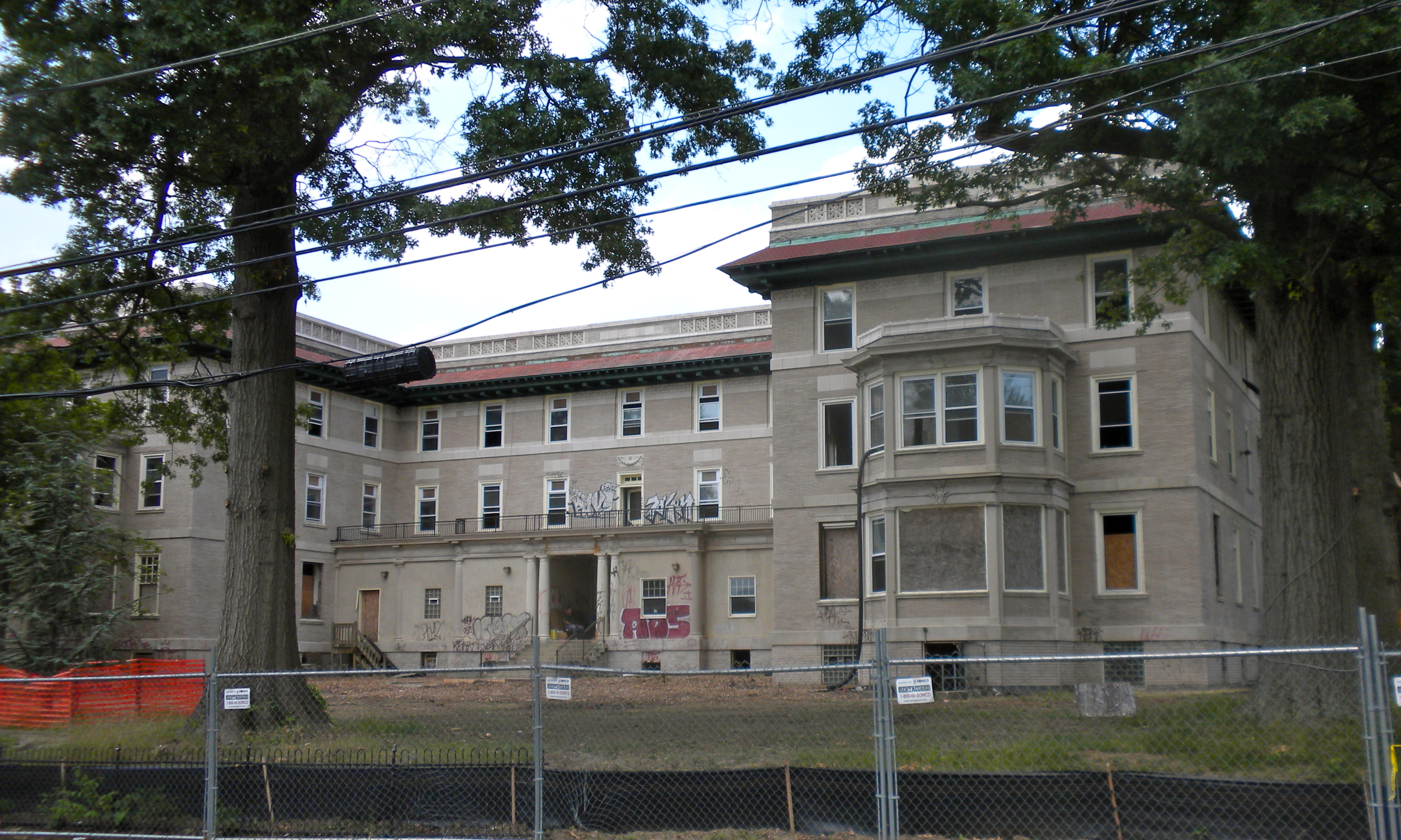
- Presser Home, June 2010

- Location within Philadelphia Location within Pennsylvania Location within the United States
- Location: 101-121 W. Johnson St., Philadelphia, Pennsylvania
- Coordinates: 40°2′43″N 75°11′7″W
- Area: 3.5 acres (1.4 ha)
- Built: 1898; 1914, 1931
- Architect: Davis & Dunlap; et al.
- Architectural style: Renaissance, Tudor Revival
- NRHP reference No.: 06001006
- Added to NRHP: November 8, 2006

The Presser Home for Retired Music Teachers, also known as the Mt. Airy Commons, is an historic retirement home in the Mount Airy neighborhood of Philadelphia, Pennsylvania, United States.

It was added to the National Register of Historic Places in 2006.

== History and architectural features ==
The Presser Home was built in 1914 and was expanded in 1931. The building is a three-story, H-shaped structure made of buff Roman brick. Designed in the Italian Renaissance Revival style, it features decorative limestone and terra cotta elements that give it a distinctive architectural character.

The complex also includes the Presser Carriage House. Designed and built in the Tudor Revival style in 1898, it is a 2 1/2-story gray brick building.

Both the main home and the carriage house were added to the National Register of Historic Places in 2006.

The Presser Home is adjacent to the Nugent Home for Baptists, another historic building that was also listed on the National Register in 2006. Both properties are owned by Nolen Properties, which completed restoration work on the Presser Home and undertook restoration efforts on the Nugent Home in 2013.
