= The Philadelphia Independent (2002–2005) =

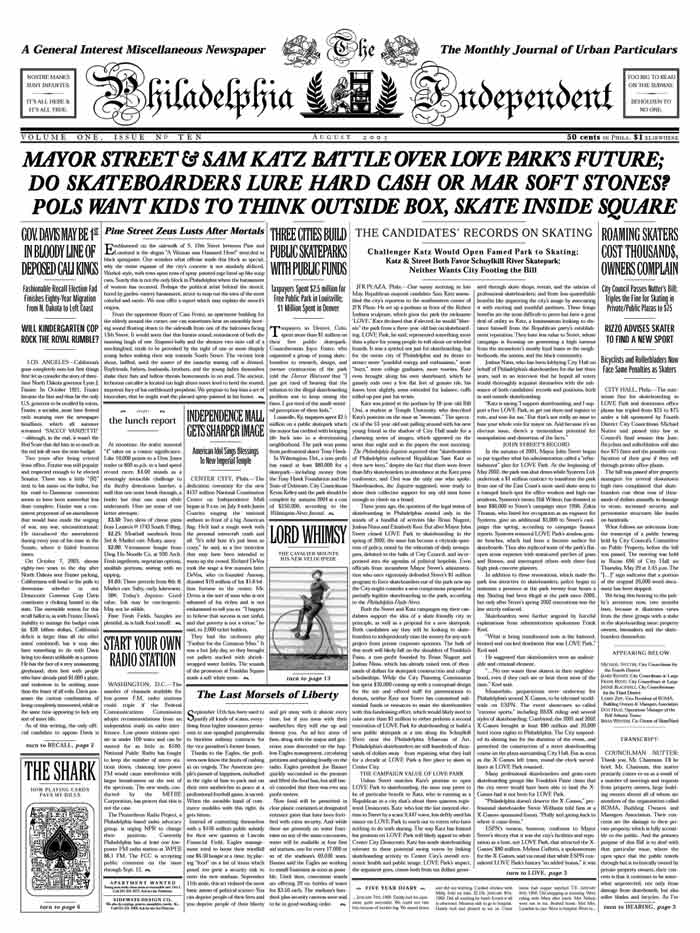
- Issue 10 front page of The Philadelphia Independent
- Type: Bi-monthly newspaper
- Format: Broadsheet
- Owner(s): Phindie Publishing LLC
- Publisher: Mattathias Schwartz
- Editor: Mattathias Schwartz
- Founded: January, 2002
- Headquarters: 1026 Arch Street; Philadelphia, PA 19107; United States
- Price: USD 1.00 Philadelphia; USD 2.00 Elsewhere

The Philadelphia Independent was a bi-monthly newspaper that served the Philadelphia, Pennsylvania area from January 2002 to March 2005. According to Mattathias Schwartz, former Editor and Publisher, the newspaper had a printed circulation of 10,000, 1,200 of which were sent to subscribers.

In "A Note to the Reader" in issue one, the Editors expressed a cynical yet hopeful view of urban culture in Philadelphia that would set the tone for the paper's 21 issue run: "For now, let us say that we are dissatisfied with modern life. We sense the germs of discovery, enlightenment and revolution lying dormant within us, the same germs that inferred the secret of the lightning bolt and cast off the yoke of empire. We want to create a frame where things are better, be that a chair, a photograph, a canvas, a song, or a newspaper."

The paper had multiple mottos: "A General Interest Miscellaneous Newspaper" and "the Periodic Journal of Urban Particulars" were printed above the masthead. "Nostre manes sunt infantes," "It's all here & It's all true," "Too big to read on the subway," and "Beholden to No One" were printed beside the masthead.

== Style and design ==
The Independent was set apart from other Philadelphia newspapers not only by its writing but by its layout and design. At 22 inches by 17 inches, The Independent was very large, even by broadsheet standards. In a compact, antiquated style, the front page would often have between 10-20 articles, far above the average.

Each section of the newspaper had illustrated page headers, with titles such as "Industry News," "Metronaut" and "The Bureau of Puzzles & Games" created by cartoonist Jacob Weinstein, who also created the layout for issues six through 21. The work of various cartoonists and illustrators were featured throughout the paper including Gary Panter, Ben Katchor.

=== Writing style ===
Much of The Independent’s writing style was an exaggeration of modern newspaper style, more in line with 19th-century or early-20th-century style similar to that of The New York Times. Front page articles often had three headlines, and extreme examples of alliteration were not uncommon. In issue twenty, of winter 2004, after President George W. Bush was reelected, the second headline after "God Help Us" read, "Reverend Rove's Red Rubes Rock Rickety Republic / Righteous Rabble Ratifies Rogue Ruler's Reign." Allen Crawford ("Lord Whimsy"), a writer and editor for the paper, stated that his own "unapologetically pompous and florid" writing style found a regular place in the paper.

== Distribution ==
Issues cost $1 inside of Philadelphia and $2 elsewhere. Distributed in various retail locations as well as in wildly painted newspaper boxes throughout downtown Philadelphia. The Independent was sold in at least 60 stores and restaurants in Philadelphia including the Weavers Way (co-op), Wooden Shoe Books and Records, and Reading Terminal Market. Outside of the city, the paper was sold at locations in Doylestown, New Hope, Pittsburgh, Baltimore, Brooklyn, Chicago, and Portland.

== Dissolution ==
In issue 21, released in March 2005, the Editors announced a temporary but possibly permanent hiatus: "We may start up again one day, and if we do, we promise our second volume will be even better than our first. But the first volume may turn out to be it for the Independent, in which case we ask only that you keep a place for us, in your desk or on your shelf."

On March 19, 2006, former Editor and Publisher Mattathias Schwartz used The Pigeon, The Independent's "eMailing List" to inform former readers of the Crier, a new publication based out of New York City, partly edited by Christine Smallwood, a former staff writer for the Independent.
