= Beggarstown =

Former community in the USA

- Neighborhood of Philadelphia
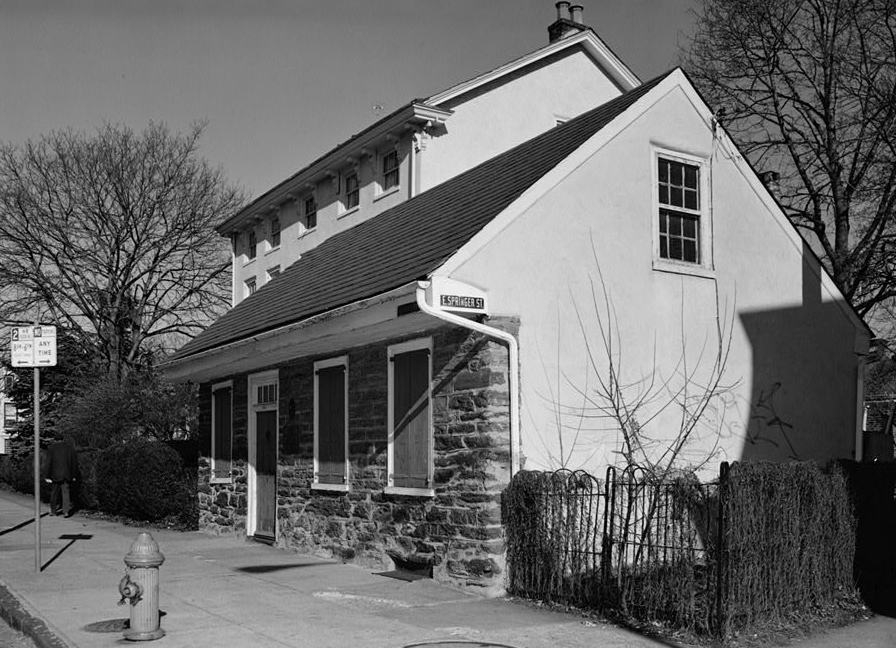
- The Beggarstown School is on the National Register of Historic Places, in Beggarstown.

- Location within Philadelphia
- Country: United States
- State: Pennsylvania
- County: Philadelphia County
- City: Philadelphia
- Area codes: 215, 267 and 445

Beggarstown or Bettelhausen was a small community that was located in the present day neighborhood of Mount Airy in Northwest Philadelphia in the U.S. state of Pennsylvania. It centered primarily along a stretch of relatively flat land along Germantown Avenue roughly between Upsal Street and Gorgas Lane.

== History ==
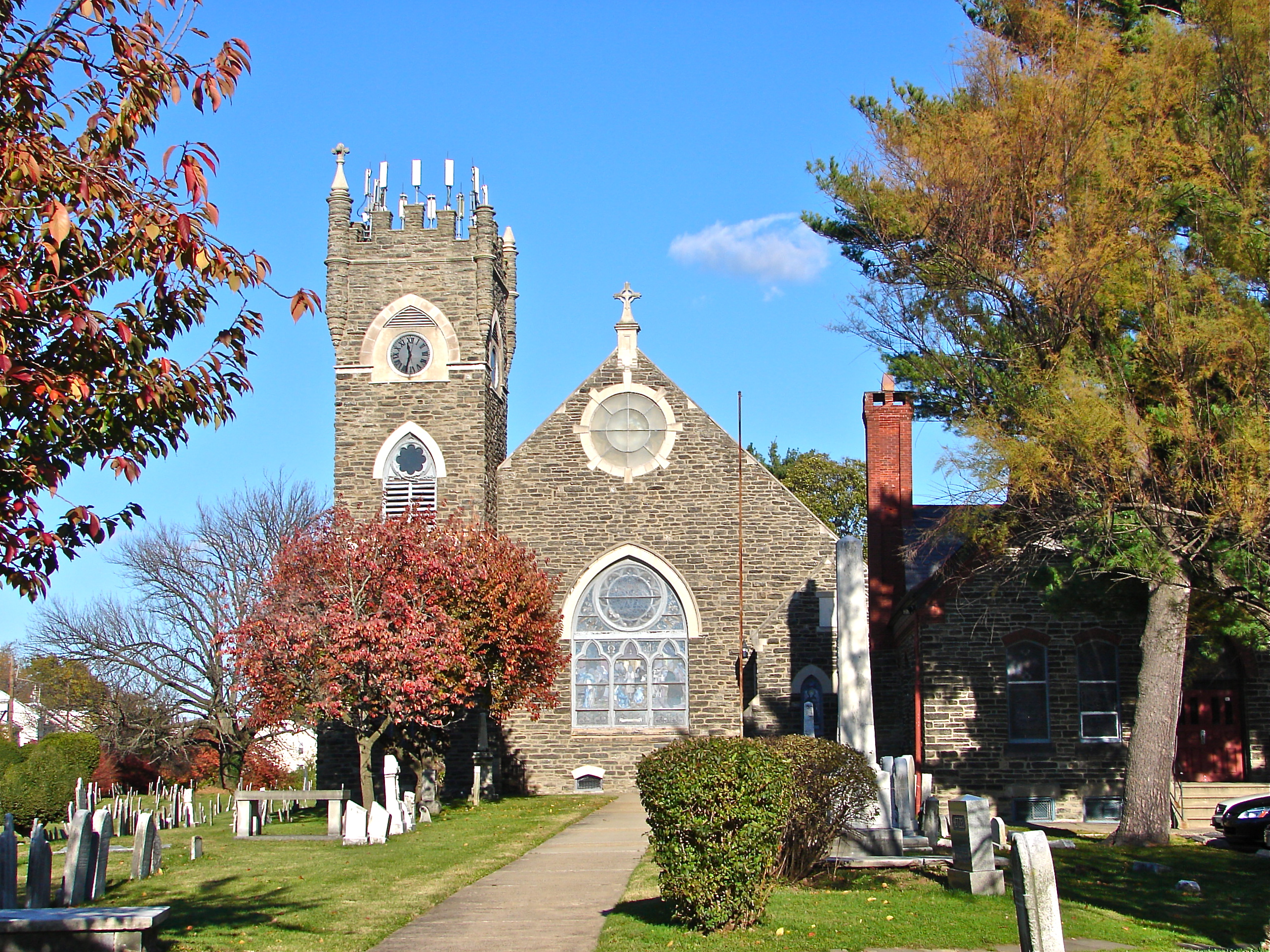
St. Michael's Lutheran Church

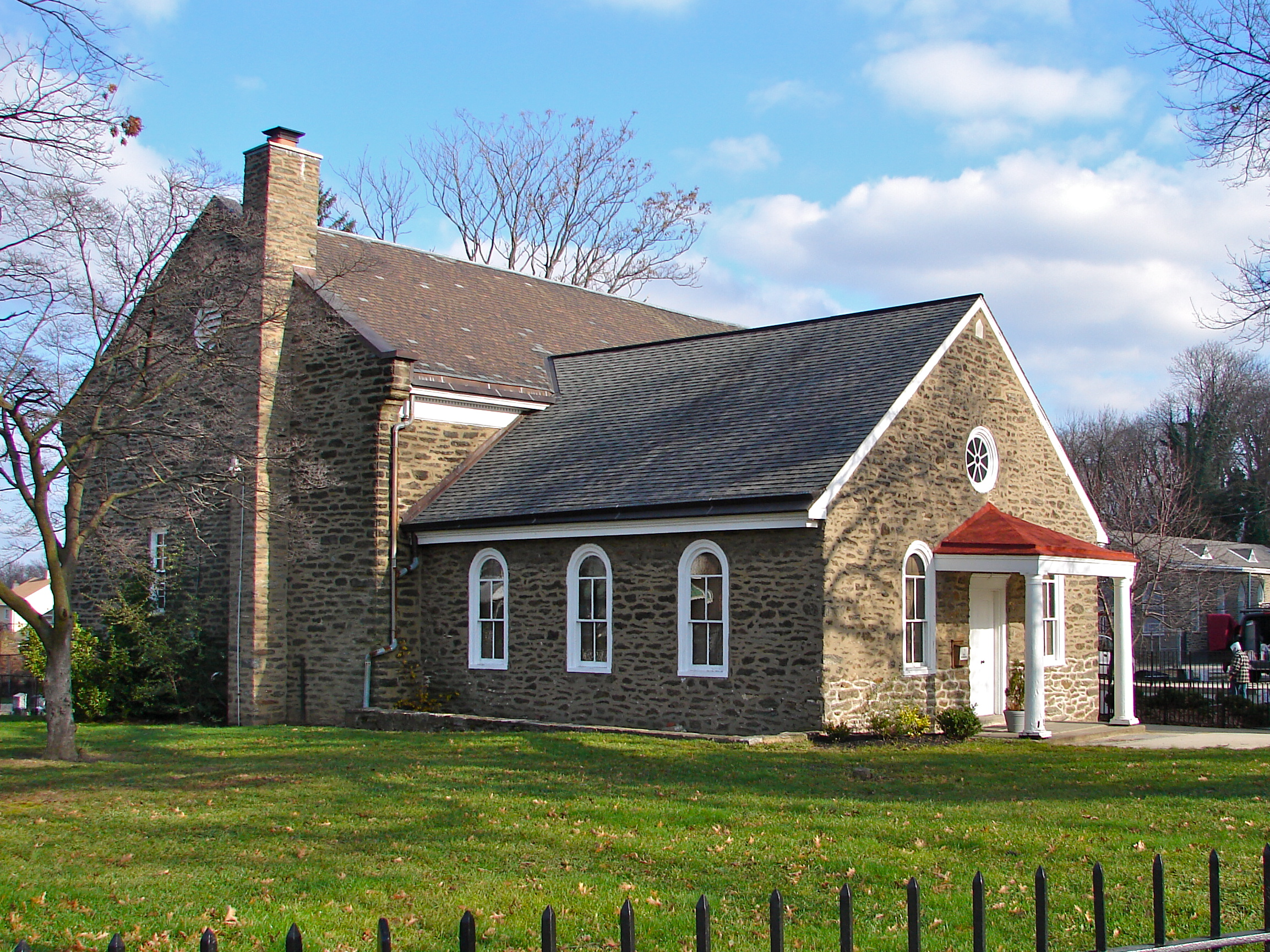
Church of the Brethren

Beggarstown (also Beggars-town or Beggar Town) or Bettelhausen was formed out of the so-called "Sidelands" of Germantown. The Sidelands were a section of Germantown Township that had been set aside so that the owners of lots in the center of Germantown could have access to an equal share of land in the entire village of Germantown section of Germantown Township. It covered the area from Washington Lane to roughly Sedgwick Street and Stenton and Wissahickon Avenues. As the Germantown village, founded in 1683, filled up, settlers began to move northwest along Germantown Avenue. By the 1730s and 1740s, the Sidelands area was subdivided into smaller house lots.

The origin of the name is explained in 1770 by Morgan Edwards in his section on the early history of the Germantown Church of the Brethren, as follows:

[The Beggarstown meeting] takes its distinction from a little village of ... [this] name, in the township of Germantown, eight miles NW from the city.... On the same lot [of their meeting house] stands their old building erected by one John Pettikoffer for his dwelling house in 1731; and because it was the first house in the place, and erected by a beggar, the village assumed the name of Beggarstown.

The German form of the name, which is probably the original form, is Bettelhausen — coming from the German word betteln, which means to beg, and hausen, which is a common suffix added to place names (like Schaffhausen) which roughly means town or village (derived from the German word Haus — house). One of the earliest uses of the name Bettelhausen appears in a newspaper ad in Christopher Sower's newspaper. One reference from 1757 appears in the church records of Saint Michael's Lutheran Church, Germantown, where the burial register entry for Nicolaus Rausch notes that he was a resident "hier in Bettelhausen." Though some late 19th century Philadelphia histories claim that the name is a corruption of Bebberstown, named for Rev. Mathias van Bebber, this is incorrect. Mathias van Bebber was not a minister and he had no direct connection with this area of Germantown Township. van Bebber was an immigrant from Krefeld, Germany and lived for a brief time in Germantown before moving to Bohemia Manor in Maryland around 1710.

In the 18th century Beggarstown was the home of two important congregations. The mother church of the Church of the Brethren denomination moved to its present location at Germantown Avenue and Hortter Street in 1760 and worshiped for a while in the Pettikoffer house until 1770 when they built a meeting house which is still in use by the congregation today. The other church which was formed very early in this village was Saint Michael's Lutheran Church. The earliest documentation for a Lutheran congregation in Germantown is found in 1738 when four men (Georg Wensell, Jacob Behlert, Georg Rieger/Rüger [later known as Rex], and Johann Groethausen) purchased a lot on Germantown Avenue which became the core of the property the congregation still owns today. St. Michael's soon became an important regional focal point for the growing number of 18th century churched (i.e. Lutheran or Reformed) German immigrants who quickly outnumbered the older German Quaker, Mennonite and Brethren families. At this time the congregation served almost all Lutherans living between the colonial city of Philadelphia and the church at Trappe, Pennsylvania.

In the 19th century, there was an effort of some of the residents of the area to change the name to Franklinville. Though they succeeded in naming a literary club and volunteer fire company with the new name, Beggarstown continued to be used by the local residents until the late nineteenth century when the spread of suburbanization eradicated the small village atmosphere along this section of Germantown Avenue.
