= Richard Alsop IV House =

Historic house in Connecticut, United States

- Alsop House
- U.S. National Register of Historic Places
- U.S. National Historic Landmark
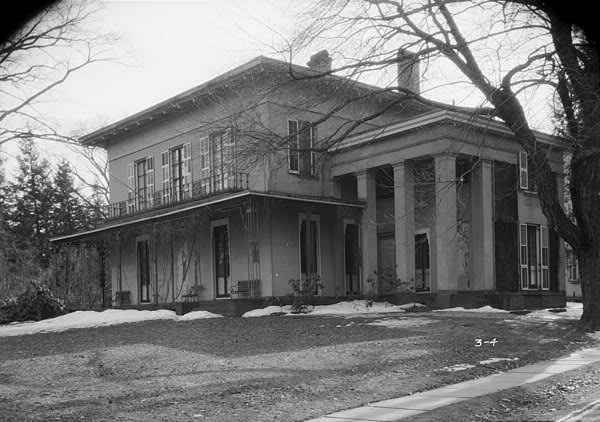
- View of the house in 1934

- Location within Connecticut Location within the United States
- Location: 301 High Street, Middletown, Connecticut
- Coordinates: 41°33′29.88″N 72°39′22.03″W
- Area: 2 acres (0.81 ha)
- Built: 1840
- Architect: Platt & Benne
- Architectural style: Greek Revival, Other
- NRHP reference No.: 70000686

Significant dates
- Added to NRHP: October 6, 1970
- Designated NHL: January 16, 2009

The Richard Alsop IV House is a historic house at 301 High Street in Middletown, Connecticut. Completed in 1839, the house is a distinctive example of transitional Greek Revival and Italianate architecture, and is nationally significant for the extremely well-preserved drawings on its interior walls. The site was designated a U.S. National Historic Landmark on January 16, 2009. The house served as the Davison Art Center of Wesleyan University until 2019. The Davison Art Collection (formerly the Davison Art Center) is now located in Olin Memorial Library.

== Relationship to its surroundings ==
This stately mansion faces east toward the Connecticut River from the west side of High Street opposite the intersection of Court Street. It is set back from the street atop a rise. A high iron fence borders the property along High Street. This house makes an important contribution to the elegance and high style which characterized High Street as the preferred residential area in nineteenth-century Middletown.

== Significance ==
The Alsop house was built in 1838–1839 by Richard Alsop IV for his twice-widowed mother, Mrs. Maria (Alsop) Dana. The short-lived architectural firm formed by Landra Beach Platt and Francis Benne, who worked together in New Haven under the tutelage of Sidney Mason Stone, is believed responsible for the design. They may have been inspired by Ithiel Town's own house in New Haven. There are similarities between the two structures and Town was formerly credited with design of the Alsop House. (Stone's possible contributions have yet to be explored.) The well-known Middletown builders, Barzillai Sage and Isaac W. Baldwin, performed the masonry and carpentry work, respectively. The house remained in the hands of Alsop family until it was acquired in 1948 by Wesleyan University.

This house is significant architecturally for its transitional Greek-Tuscan Italianate appearance. The cubical, two-story, central block with overhanging eaves is flanked by colonnaded 1 1/2-story wings. A swag-and-tassel design decorates the frieze of the central block, which also displays a veranda supported by delicate ironwork and surmounted by an intricate balustrade.

A rear colonnaded wing, which originally housed servant's quarters and service facility, has been enclosed. At the west end of this wing are attached an art gallery of recent construction and the art library, originally the stable.

The interior of the Alsop house is noted for its decorative wall paintings. The stair hall displays trompe-l'œil painting of figures in niches, while the parlors, dining room and morning-room feature oil-on-plaster paintings. The parlor paintings are classically derived and some subjects are Raphaelesque in origin. In the morning room, the formal classicism of the parlors is replaced by scenes derived from the "rural" Italian tradition of wall decoration. Local birds and insects are featured in these scenes. The dining room displays a painted frieze. The paintings are believed to have been executed by German or Italian immigrant artisans. Possible contributors include the noted Italian artist Nicola Monachesi. According to family documentation, the paintings were executed between 1839 and 1860.

The main rooms of the house are furnished with period antiques and provide a suitable atmosphere in which to display the wall painting. In its carefully restored condition, the Alsop house remains a monument to the skill of its designers, while serving Wesleyan University and the community as the Digital Design Commons.

== See also ==
- List of National Historic Landmarks in Connecticut
- National Register of Historic Places listings in Middletown, Connecticut
