= Beggarstown School =

- U.S. National Register of Historic Places
- U.S. National Historic Landmark District – Contributing property
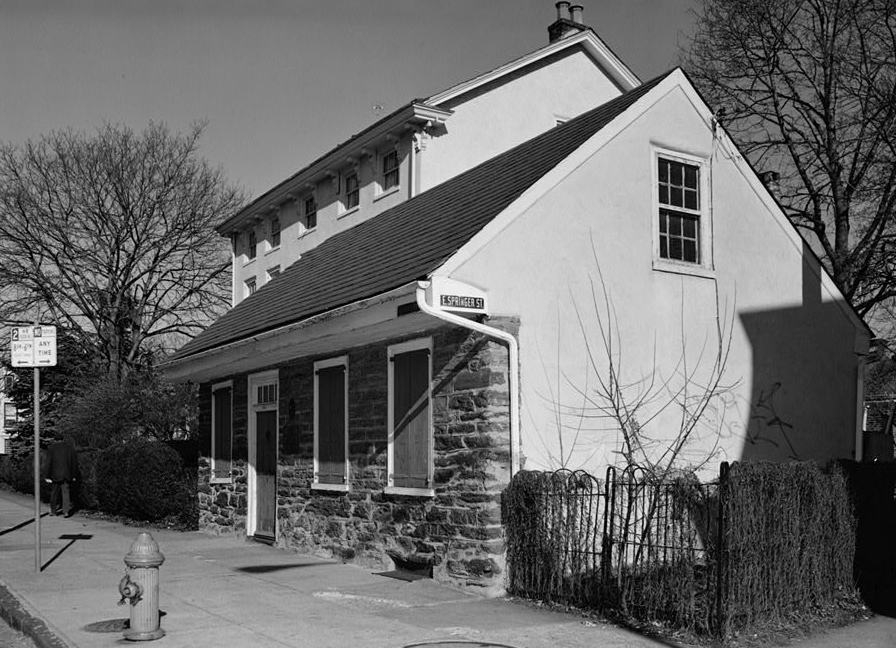
- School in 1972

- Location within Philadelphia Location within Pennsylvania Location within the United States
- Location: 6669 Germantown Ave., Philadelphia, Pennsylvania
- Coordinates: 40°3′5″N 75°11′7″W
- Area: less than one acre
- Built: 1740
- NRHP reference No.: 71000718
- Added to NRHP: November 23, 1971

The Beggarstown School, built c. 1740, is a historic school in Beggarstown, Philadelphia, Pennsylvania, now part of the Mount Airy neighborhood. It is a rare example of a school building from the colonial era.

== Architecture and history ==
The small building has one-and-a-half stories and measures 28 feet 3 inches (8.61 m) across the front, and 18 feet 3 inches (5.56 m) along the sides. A brick el in the rear was added after a 1915 restoration. The four-bay front is constructed of Wissahickon schist ashlar, and the sides of stuccoed rubble. The school was altered in 1840. A few of the original floorboards remain in the otherwise greatly altered interior.

The school is owned by the adjacent St. Michael's Evangelical Lutheran Church. While most students were part of the Lutheran congregation, some attended simply because it was the closest local school. Its teachers taught basic reading, writing, and arithmetic, unlike the more sophisticated Germantown Academy or Union School which was located about one-and-a-half miles south.

It was listed on the National Register of Historic Places in 1971. It is also a contributing building in the Colonial Germantown Historic District, a National Historic Landmark Historic District.

It is currently home to Alena's Café.

== See also ==
Concord School, a nearby school built in 1775
