= JP Larocque =

Canadian screenwriter and journalist

JP Larocque is a Canadian screenwriter, producer, and journalist. They are best known for their work on the CBC and HBO Max series Sort Of, for which they were nominated for both a Peabody Award and Best Writing in a Comedy Series at the 11th Canadian Screen Awards in 2023.

Larocque is creator and executive producer of the web series Gay Nerds, which ran from 2012 to 2015 and was distributed by OutTV. They have since written or produced episodes of North of North, Small Achievable Goals, Saint-Pierre, Allegiance, SkyMed, How to Fail as a Popstar, Diggstown, Coroner, Jann, Another Life, and Slasher. In 2023, The Globe and Mail listed Larocque among “the 25 most influential people in Canadian television.”

In 2022, they wrote and produced a Heritage Minute on pioneering transgender American soul and rhythm and blues singer Jackie Shane, and created and developed the Murdoch Mysteries spin-off series Macy Murdoch for CBC Gem with Jessica Meya.

In 2024, Larocque was nominated for a Canadian Screen Award as a co-executive producer of the Family Channel series Home Sweet Rome. In 2025, they were nominated for both a Canadian Screen Award and a WGC Screenwriting Award for their work on the series Popularity Papers (alongside showrunner Vivian Lin). In 2026, they were nominated for both a WGC Screenwriting Award (alongside Garry Campbell and Aviaq Johnston) and an Independent Spirit Award for their work on the Netflix/CBC series North of North.

Larocque was also a regular panelist on the final two seasons of the MTV Canada talk show 1 Girl 5 Gays.

== Awards ==
Award	Year	Category	Work	Result	Ref.
Peabody Awards	2023	Entertainment Honouree	Sort Of	Nominated	
Canadian Screen Awards	2023	Best Writing in a Comedy Series	Sort Of: "Sort Of Broke"	Nominated	
Canadian Screen Awards	2024	Best Children's or Youth Fiction Program or Series (as Co-Executive Producer)	Home Sweet Rome	Nominated	
Canadian Screen Awards	2025	Best Writing, Children's or Youth (with Vivian Lin)	Popularity Papers: "Let's Sick Together"	Nominated	
WGC Screenwriting Awards	2025	Best Writing, Tween & Teens (with Vivian Lin)	Popularity Papers: "Let's Sick Together"	Nominated	
WGC Screenwriting Awards	2026	Best Writing, Comedy (with Aviaq Johnston & Garry Campbell)	North of North: "Bad Influences"	Nominated	
Film Independent Spirit Awards	2026	Best New Scripted Series (as Co-Executive Producer)	North of North	Nominated	
