= Sedgwick Theater =

Coordinates: 40°03′34″N 75°11′25″W

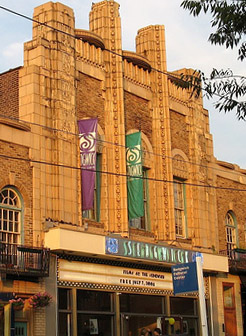
The Sedgwick Theater in Philadelphia, as it looks today

An original Sedgwick ticket. The original image of the ticket was torn, this is a Photoshop doctoring of it to recreate it whole.

The Sedgwick Theater is a historic American theater in the Mt. Airy neighborhood of Philadelphia, Pennsylvania.

It was built in 1928 and designed by architect William Harold Lee. It is one of the remaining 20 Philadelphia theaters as of 2006 which he designed; nine have been demolished. Only two in Philadelphia are open – The Ace Theater (Holiday Art Theater) and The Sedgwick Theater. Two more of Lee's theaters just outside of Philadelphia have been restored: the Bryn Mawr and the Hiway Theater in Jenkintown.

The Sedgwick Theater, located at 7137 Germantown Ave in Philadelphia, is designed in the 1920s style of an art deco movie palace. It was built during a movie revolution with the advent of sync sound and hosted silent films as well as talkies. This perhaps explains the theater's design including a stage for live performance, as well as its large single screen.

The Sedgwick was designed to include a balcony, but shortly before construction, it was removed from the plans (a balcony would likely have increased seating to 2000). This accounts for its vaulted ceilings.

== Interior design ==
When entering the theater, ticket were bought at the ticket booth, beyond which was a rectangular lobby space. This led to a larger oval lobby with a coat check. The men's and women's rooms were on opposing ends of the lobby. The oval lobby was a pivot point of the design, and the theater's footprint traveled back and to the left of the lot from that point. Entering the theater through five large archways, the rake of the seats dropped about 15 feet to the screen.

== Operating history ==
The theater opened in 1928 and remained in operation until 1966. When it closed, it was purchased for use as a warehouse. The theater building was split in two. A cinderblock wall was constructed, closing off the theater space from the lobbies. The theater was stripped of its seats and the rake, leaving a gutted box in the back. The ceiling of the theater was left somewhat intact, and a beautiful art deco ceiling medallion still exists. Part of the proscenium arch is also still intact. However, it is little more than a garage there for the moment.

== Restoration ==
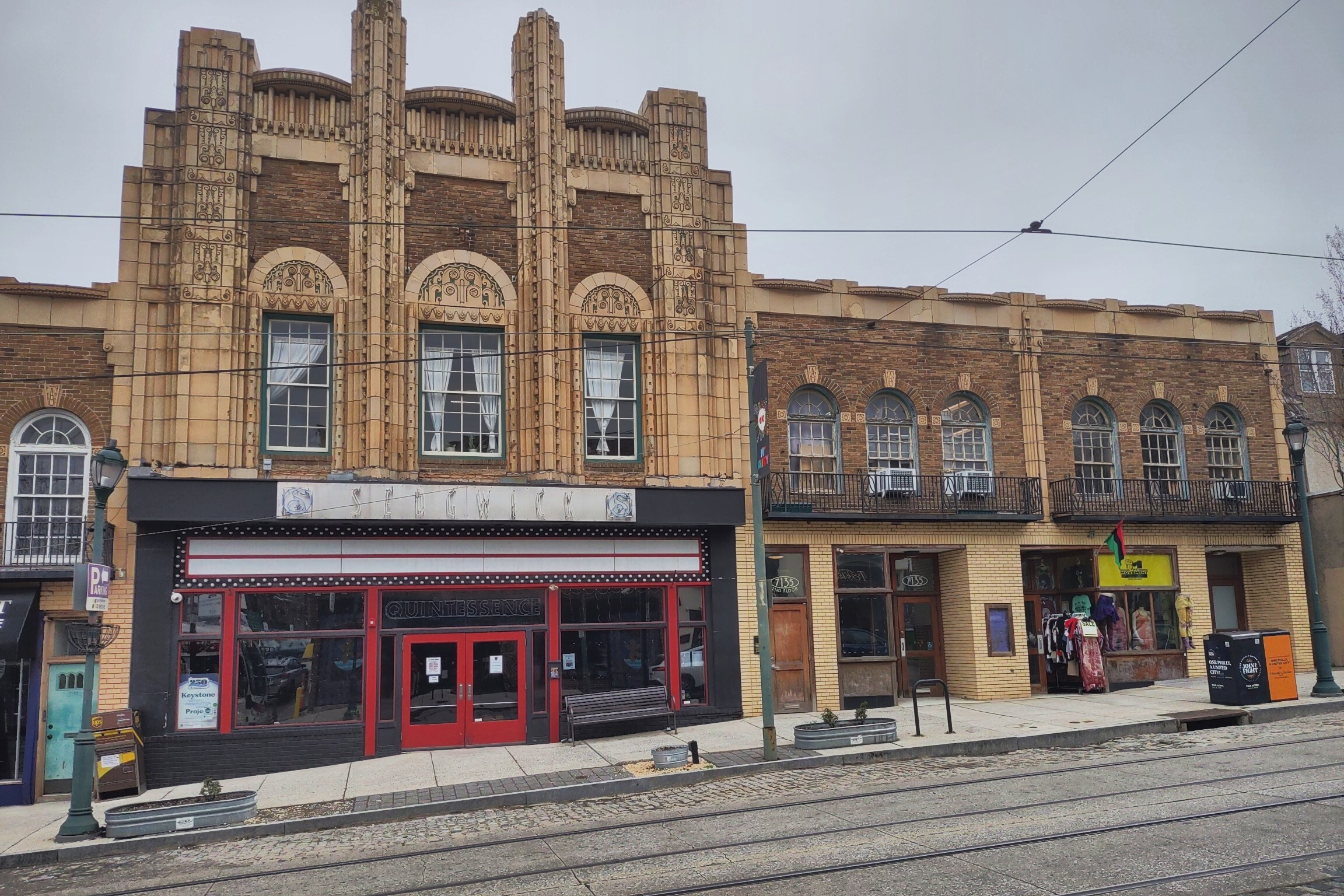
In 2026

The building was already significantly damaged when David and Betty Ann Fellner purchased it. They set up the Sedgwick Cultural Center, a not-for-profit organization, in 1995. The Sedgwick Cultural Center's mission was to build community through the arts. A stage was constructed in the oval Lobby, and performance have been held in that space since then.

However, by 2006, despite having brought the Philadelphia community programming for ten years, the condition of the theater had not improved, and the Sedgwick Cultural Center separated from it.

The price tag for a complete building restoration has been suggested to be US$10 to 12 million, not including the cost to create a business in the space which could make the Sedgwick self-sustaining.

Before 2010, the Sedgwick Theater was a community art space, with a gallery where the ticket booth was once located. The inner lobbies were occasionally home to "Films at the Sedgwick."

To alleviate the risks of renting films to screen at the Sedgwick Theater, Films at the Sedgwick screened public domain films and created an interactive website for the community to take control of the programming to show. Film Q Public was a list of films for the community to consider screening. Each film had a plot summary and when available, a streaming movie trailer. Users voted for the films they wanted to see. Votes were tallied and once the film received enough votes, that film was scheduled.

In May 2010, the Quintessence Theatre Group began renting the Sedgwick for a classical repertory troupe. Their first production was Measure for Measure. They are the sole occupants of the theater as of September 2019.

== Organ ==
When it opened the Sedgwick had a Möller pipe organ (Opus 5230). When the theater closed in 1966 the organ was removed and placed in storage. After over twenty years in storage the instrument was re-installed in the Keswick Theatre.

== See also ==
- Boyd Theatre
