= The Popularity Papers =

Middle grade book series by Amy Ignatow

- First edition of first book in series
- Author: Amy Ignatow
- Publisher: Amulet Books
- Publication date: 2010-
- Publication place: United States
- Pages: 208 pages
- ISBN: 0-8109-8421-0

The Popularity Papers is a middle grade book series written and illustrated by Amy Ignatow. The first book of the series was published in 2010. To date, six sequels have been published.

1. Book one: Research for the Social Improvement and General Betterment of Lydia Goldblatt and Julie Graham-Chang (Apr 2010)
2. Book two: The Long-Distance Dispatch Between Lydia Goldblatt and Julie Graham-Chang (Mar 2011)
3. Book three: Words of (Questionable) Wisdom from Lydia Goldblatt and Julie Graham-Chang (Oct 2011)
4. Book four: The Rocky Road Trip of Lydia Goldblatt and Julie Graham-Chang (Apr 2012)
5. Book five: The Awesomely Awful Melodies of Lydia Goldblatt and Julie Graham-Chang (Mar 2013)
6. Book six: Love and Other Fiascos with Lydia Goldblatt and Julie Graham-Chang (Oct 2013)
7. Book seven: The Less-Than-Hidden Secrets and Final Revelations of Lydia Goldblatt and Julie Graham-Chang (Sept 2014)

The books were later adapted into a television series, Popularity Papers, which premiered in 2023.

== Plot and sequels ==
Two fifth-grade friends, Lydia Goldblatt and Julie Graham-Chang, want to learn how to be popular before entering middle school. The first book of the series is their journal, documenting their misadventures to become more popular, as well as their family and school life. Sequels continue the story of Lydia and Julie and their friends and families, as they progress into middle school.

=== Series ===
The first novel in the series, Research for the Social Improvement and General Betterment of Lydia Goldblatt and Julie Graham-Chang, was published on April 1, 2010. After receiving initially positive reviews, Ignatow completed the second edition of the series The Long-Distance Dispatch Between Lydia Goldblatt and Julie Graham-Chang, which was published on March 1, 2011. The third novel in the series was published only seven months later (October 1, 2011), entitled Words of (Questionable) Wisdom from Lydia Goldblatt and Julie Graham-Chang. On April 1, 2012, The Rocky Road Trip of Lydia Goldblatt and Julie Graham-Chang was published, the only sequel released in 2012. The 5th edition of the series was published on March 5, 2013, The Awesomely Awful Melodies of Lydia Goldblatt and Julie Graham-Chang. The final two novels in The Popularity Papers series were called Love and Other Fiascos with Lydia Goldblatt and Julie Graham-Chang (published on October 8, 2013) and The Less-Than-Hidden Secrets and Final Revelations of Lydia Goldblatt and Julie Graham-Chang (published on September 9, 2014), respectively.

== Format ==
The story is told in a journal format, written and drawn by the two main characters. The books are hand-drawn, with each of the two main protagonists having a different writing and drawing style. In interviews with the news media, Ignatow has shown that she only uses writing and drawing implements that are easily available to children, such as crayons, markers, and colored pencils. Similar to many other fictional and satirical children's novels, The Popularity Papers is written in a journal or diary format, illustrating the events of the protagonists as they seek to resolve their quest of determining the causation of popularity. In this way, the author of such a novel is able to relate the content in a much more familiar and friendly setting to the children whom are targeted as the primary reading demographic. There are many examples of similarly formatted children's novels that have seen commercial success, such as the extremely well known Diary of a Wimpy Kid amongst many others. On top of relating to youth experiences in school, the format of The Popularity Papers also assists young readers in comprehending the storyline and providing visual aid to complement any struggles. The viability of the journal-type format in children's books has proven to be a successful concept, seen notably by the Diary of a Wimpy Kid series which has been on the New York Times' bestseller list for over 10 years and earned author Jeff Kinney a spot on Time's most influential people.

== Analysis ==
=== Themes ===
One of the many perennial themes in literature is bildungsroman, a story set during, or about, the coming of age of the protagonist(s). The Popularity Papers, as a novel about two middle school girls, certainly qualifies as such. In their many expeditions to determine the essence of popularity in junior high, Julie and Lydia have a multitude of complex subjects and adult concepts foisted upon them, which lead them to "growing up," or at least to begin realizing what the adult world has in store for them. Among the most prominent and complicated for the two girls are romance, particularly when a young Norwegian boy named Roland confesses his love, and friendship, which they soon discover can be fragile. Their endeavors lead to plenty of comical events, as well, such as when their effort to obtain phones from their parents ends poorly. This realization that their budding independence might conflict with their parents is yet another instance where the girls begin to comprehend that their world is changing as they continue to grow up, a crucial tenet of a bildungsroman storyline.

== Publication ==
=== Reception ===
The first book in The Popularity Papers series was selected as a top-ten title for 2011 by the American Library Association's Rainbow Project. It was a 2010 Gold Award winner by the National Parenting Publications Association and selected by the Chicago Public Library as one of the 2011 "Best of the Best" books.

The first book's review in The New York Times 2010 summer reading issue (June 4, 2010) called the author "hugely talented". Publishers Weekly noted that the plot was "predictable", but stated that "Readers will quickly devour this hilarious, heartfelt debut."

The School Library Journal's blog called the first book, "A really great book and worth a close inspection. And if I absolutely have to compare it to Jeff Kinney’s series, I’ll do it this way: This is the funniest book I’ve read for kids since discovering Diary of a Wimpy Kid."

=== Controversy ===
The Popularity Papers was listed by the American Literary Association as being a frequently challenged book in the children's genre. These challenges originate from the inclusion of two homosexual fathers of one of the girls in the comic series. Despite having little to do with the plot or the themes of the novels, the novel and its supporters were forced to defend it in the public sector. For example, in 2013, a Washington state middle school social studies teacher contested the use of the novel for class reading citing the presence of a major political debate, referring to homosexuality, thus classifying the series as age-inappropriate. The school board did not follow the teacher's suggestions. The Popularity Papers has since been commonly viewed as a challenged novel in children's literature.
