= Amy Ignatow =

American cartoonist, illustrator and writer (born 1977)

- Born: September 15, 1977 (age 48); Huntington, New York, U.S.
- Education: SUNY Oneonta; Moore College of Art and Design
- Writing career
- Notable works: The Popularity Papers; The Odds Trilogy
- Website: www.abramsbooks.com/contributor/amy-ignatow_940458

Amy Ignatow (born September 15, 1977) is an American author, illustrator, and cartoonist. She is best known for the children's book series, The Popularity Papers.

== Personal life ==
Ignatow was born and raised in Huntington, New York, on Long Island. She graduated from Huntington High School in 1995. She attended SUNY Oneonta and later transferred to study illustration at Moore College of Art and Design in Philadelphia, graduating magna cum laude in 2002. In 2009, she sold her first book to Abrams Books and bought a home in Mount Airy, Philadelphia.

== Professional career ==
Her first book, The Popularity Papers: Research for the Social Improvement and General Betterment of Lydia Goldblatt and Julie Graham-Chang, was published by Amulet Books in spring 2010. Positive reviews of the book appeared in The New York Times, School Library Journal, and other publications and review web sites, such as KidLiterate. The sequels were similarly well-reviewed, and became a seven-book series about middle schoolers Julie and Lydia.

Ignatow has since written several additional children's books.

According to her author biography, Ignatow has worked as a teacher, a farmer, a florist, a short-order vegan cook, a ghostwriter for Internet personal ads, a telefundraiser, a wedding singer, and an air-brush face and body painter.

== Bibliography ==
=== The Popularity Papers ===
1. Research for the Social Improvement and General Betterment of Lydia Goldblatt and Julie Graham-Chang (April 2010)
2. The Long-Distance Dispatch Between Lydia Goldblatt and Julie Graham-Chang (March 2011)
3. Words of (Questionable) Wisdom from Lydia Goldblatt and Julie Graham-Chang (October 2011)
4. The Rocky Road Trip of Lydia Goldblatt and Julie Graham-Chang (April 2012)
5. The Awesomely Awful Melodies of Lydia Goldblatt and Julie Graham-Chang (March 2013)
6. Love and Other Fiascos with Lydia Goldblatt and Julie Graham-Chang (October 2013)
7. The Less-Than-Hidden Secrets and Final Revelations of Lydia Goldblatt and Julie Graham-Chang (September 2014)

=== The Odds Trilogy ===
1. The Mighty Odds (September 2016)
2. Against the Odds (September 2017)
3. Odds & Ends (September 2018)

=== Jedi Academy (with Jarrett J. Krosoczka) ===
1. Jedi Academy: Revenge of the Sis (March 2019)
2. Jedi Academy: Attack of the Furball (September 2019)
3. Jedi Academy: At Last, Jedi (April 2020)

=== Other ===
1. The Cutest Thing Ever (September 2019)
2. Symphony for a Broken Orchestra: How Philadelphia Collected Sounds to Save Music (October 2022)
