= Robert M. Hogue House =

Historic house in Pennsylvania, United States

- U.S. National Register of Historic Places
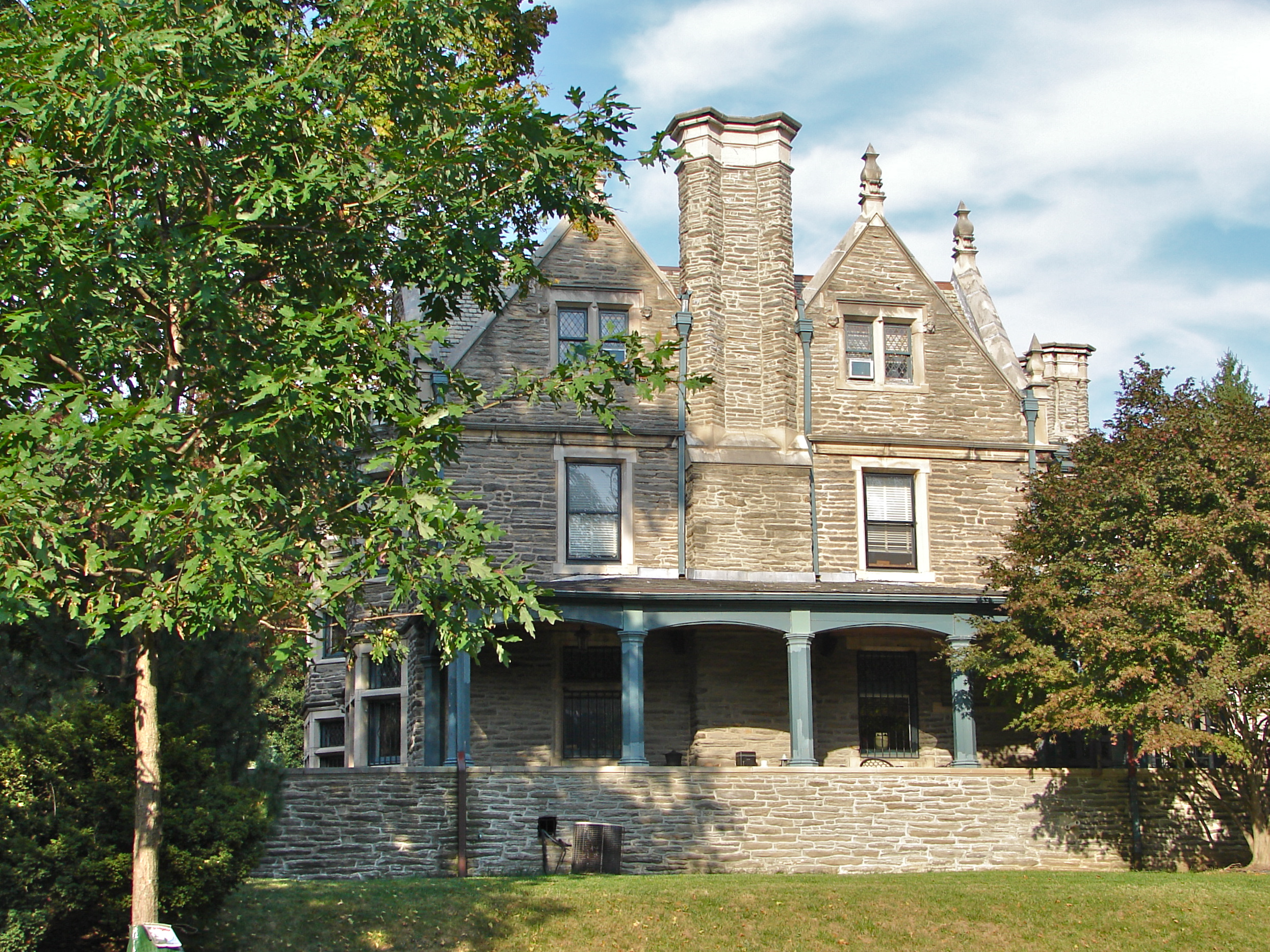
- Robert M. Hogue House, October 2010

- Location within Philadelphia Location within Pennsylvania Location within the United States
- Location: 100 Pelham Rd., Philadelphia, Pennsylvania
- Coordinates: 40°3′7″N 75°11′17″W
- Area: 0.8 acres (0.32 ha)
- Built: 1896, 1901
- Architect: D.K. & L.V. Boyd
- Architectural style: Late 19th And 20th Century Revivals, Jacobean
- NRHP reference No.: 86000165
- Added to NRHP: January 16, 1986

The Robert M. Hogue House is an historic mansion in the Mount Airy neighborhood of Philadelphia, Pennsylvania, United States.

It was added to the National Register of Historic Places on January 16, 1986.

== History and architectural features ==
This historic structure was built in 1896 and is a 2 1/2-story, rectangular, stone dwelling that was designed in the Jacobean revival style. It features two-story projecting bays with leaded glass windows, soaring cross gables and dormers, and pointed arch openings. Also located on the property is a contributing stable/carriage house and a free-standing, stone fireplace. It housed the Philadelphia School of Criminology from the late-1940s to 1963, then housed Combs School of Music until 1983.
