= Weavers Way Co-op =

Coordinates: 40°2′47.46″N 75°11′45.38″W

Weavers Way Co-op is a member-owned consumers' cooperative in Philadelphia's West Mt. Airy section. Founded in 1973, Weavers Way Co-op was formed as a neighborhood buying club in a church basement. Since its incorporation, it has grown to more than 15,000 member households, with annual sales of nearly $20 million. After moving to its location at 559 Carpenter Lane, Weavers Way expanded, purchasing the adjacent building and consolidating the two buildings. Subsequent expansions included the purchase of two buildings across the street, which include a retail pet supply store, retail health and wellness store and offices. Weavers Way expanded again, adding a second, larger store in Chestnut Hill, at 8424 Germantown Ave, at the former Caruso's grocery store site, in 2010 and a health and beauty specialty store, also in Chestnut Hill, in 2013. For several years, Weavers Way also ran a third smaller store in the West Oak Lane section of Philadelphia, but that closed in September 2011. In 2024, Weavers Way opened another store in Germantown. The Co-op rents warehouse space several miles away in the Nicetown section, in the SHARE food pantry complex. Two farm operations comprise 5.5 acres, one at Awbury Arboretum in Germantown and one on the grounds of Saul Agricultural High School in Roxborough. Weavers Way has participated in such events and organizations as Mt. Airy Day, Mt. Airy ArtJam, Mt. Airy YouthWorks, Mt. Airy Business Association, Mt. Airy USA (MAUSA), Mt. Airy Village Fair, Chestnut Hill's Fall for the Arts Festival and the XPoNential Music Fest.

== Membership and shopping ==
Membership is available to anyone; an equity investment in the Co-op is required of all members. Although working at the Co-op was formerly a requirement and non-members could not shop, it is now an option, and Weavers Way stores are open to the general public. Working members in good standing receive a discount on all their purchases, and all members receive special prices on some goods and services, as well as other benefits, like discounts at many area businesses.

== Community activities ==
Weavers Way is also active in the community, primarily through its nonprofit arm, Weavers Way Community Programs (WWCP), which administers the Co-op's educational programs. WWCP partners with elementary schools to teach students about farming, health and nutrition, in programs that include tours of the Weavers Way Farms. In addition to programs at Mort Brooks Memorial Farm at Awbury Arboretum and Henry Got Crops! community supported agriculture (CSA) farm at Saul Agricultural High School, WWCP runs the Hope Garden at Stenton Family Manor, a shelter for homeless families in Germantown.

The Mort Brooks Farm was Weavers Way's first farm, an urban intensive organic farm a few miles from Weavers Way at Awbury Arboretum in Germantown. Named after a member who was instrumental to the Co-op’s early success, the farm was founded in 2000, in large part due to the efforts of Mort's widow, Norma Brooks. In 2007, Weavers Way moved to transform the mostly volunteer run farm into a market farm with a structured educational program, a full-time horticulturalist and a farm educator. Since then, the farm program has grown to include several acres at the current locations, with a full-time farm manager, two farm educators and several apprentices and interns. Hundreds of students come through the farm's education programs each year.

Weavers Way publishes a monthly newspaper, The Shuttle, which is mailed to members and available free to the community at the stores and at numerous drop locations in Northwest Philadelphia. In addition to Co-op businesses, it covers topics of interests to the larger community, including food and food justice, the environment and local issues. Both the Shuttle and Weavers Way's social networking outlets promote community events and publicize neighborhood issues.

== Scandal ==
A bookkeeping scandal in 2002 nearly bankrupted the Co-op - the bookkeeper had been concealing evidence that the Co-op was losing money. Criminal charges against the bookkeeper were later settled, and there was no evidence that the bookkeeper personally used Co-op funds or otherwise benefited from her mismanagement of the co-op's finances. The scandal exposed the need for the co-op to modernize and professionalize its practices, which has been done, with the restructuring of the finance department, audits, oversight and other fiscal best practices.

== Growth ==
Bolstered by improved finances in the years following the scandal, together with increased membership, Weavers Way expanded to two new locations in Philadelphia, the first in 2008 in West Oak Lane and named Weavers Way Ogontz, located on 2129 72nd Ave., just off Ogontz Avenue, a major thoroughfare. In September, 2011, citing continuing losses, Weavers Way transferred ownership of the West Oak Lane store to the Ogontz Avenue Revitalization Corporation (OARC), which announced plans to reopen the store as a non-cooperative community market. A second grocery store was opened in 2010 in Chestnut Hill, in the location of the former Caruso's Market at 8424 Germantown Ave. In the larger space, the Co-op was able to offer popular options like a prepared foods hot bar that are not available at the Mt. Airy location. In 2012, the Mt. Airy store was completely renovated, with new flooring and systems, and the inauguration of a bulk products section in the revamped 2nd floor. Mt. Airy housewares and HABA (health and beauty aids) was relocated to share the renovated Weavers Way Across the Way, at 608-610 Carpenter Lane, with the Pet Store. In 2013, a natural HABA outlet, called Weavers Way Next Door, was opened at 8426 Germantown Ave.
