= Malvern Hall =

- U.S. National Register of Historic Places
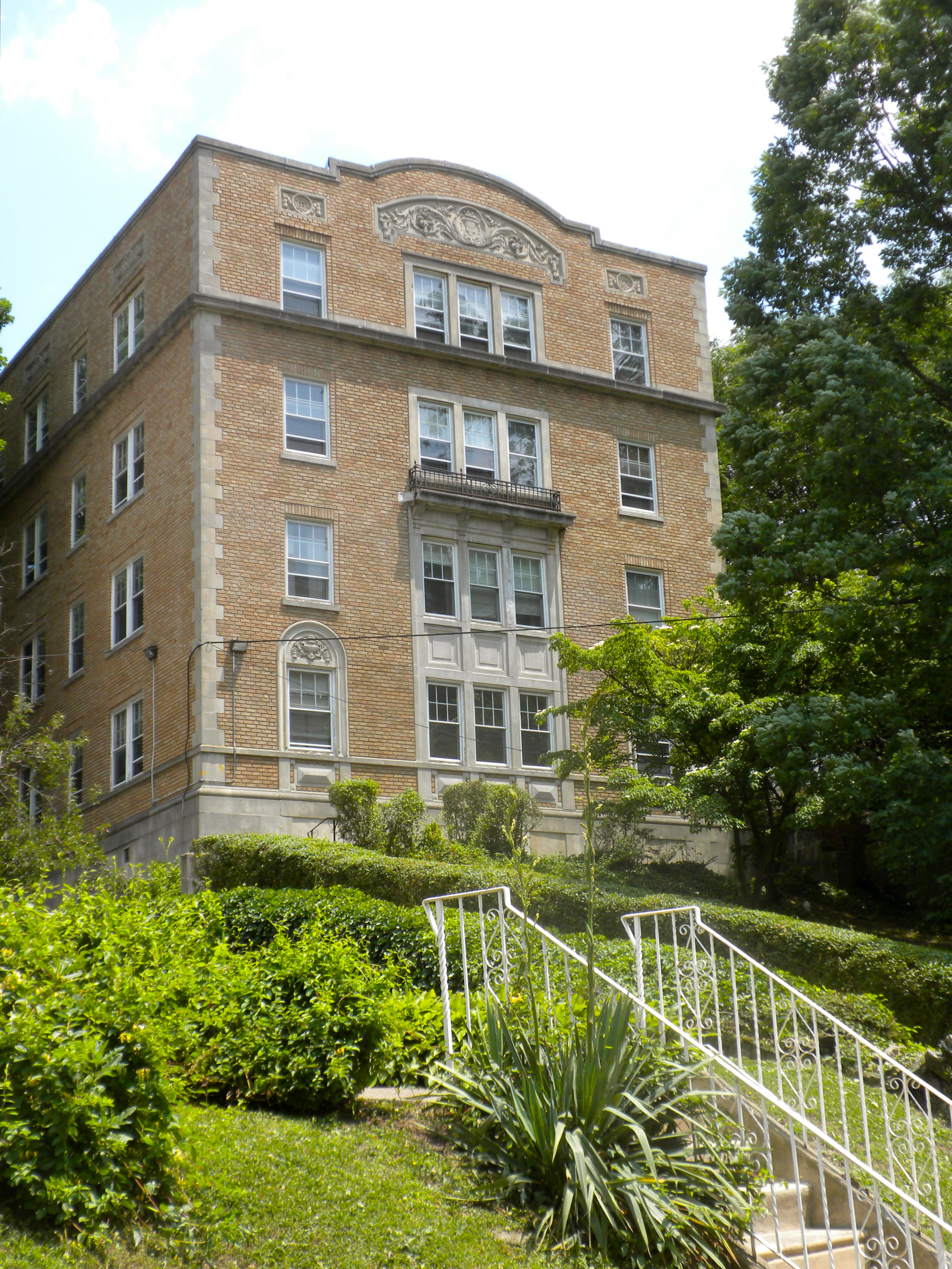
- Malvern Hall, June 2010

- Location within Philadelphia Location within Pennsylvania Location within the United States
- Location: 6655 McCallum St., Philadelphia, Pennsylvania
- Coordinates: 40°2′45″N 75°11′31″W
- Area: 1.3 acres (0.53 ha)
- Built: 1925
- Architect: Beckerman, Henry; Ballinger & Co.
- Architectural style: Late 19th And 20th Century Revivals
- NRHP reference No.: 83002273
- Added to NRHP: August 25, 1983

Malvern Hall is an historic apartment building in the Mount Airy neighborhood of Philadelphia, Pennsylvania, United States.

Located next to McCallum Manor, it was added to the National Register of Historic Places in 1983.

== History and architectural features ==
Built in 1925, this historic structure is a four-story, H-shaped, steel-framed building that is faced in brick and stone. Also located on the property is a contributing garage unit.
