= Nugent Home for Baptists =

- U.S. National Register of Historic Places
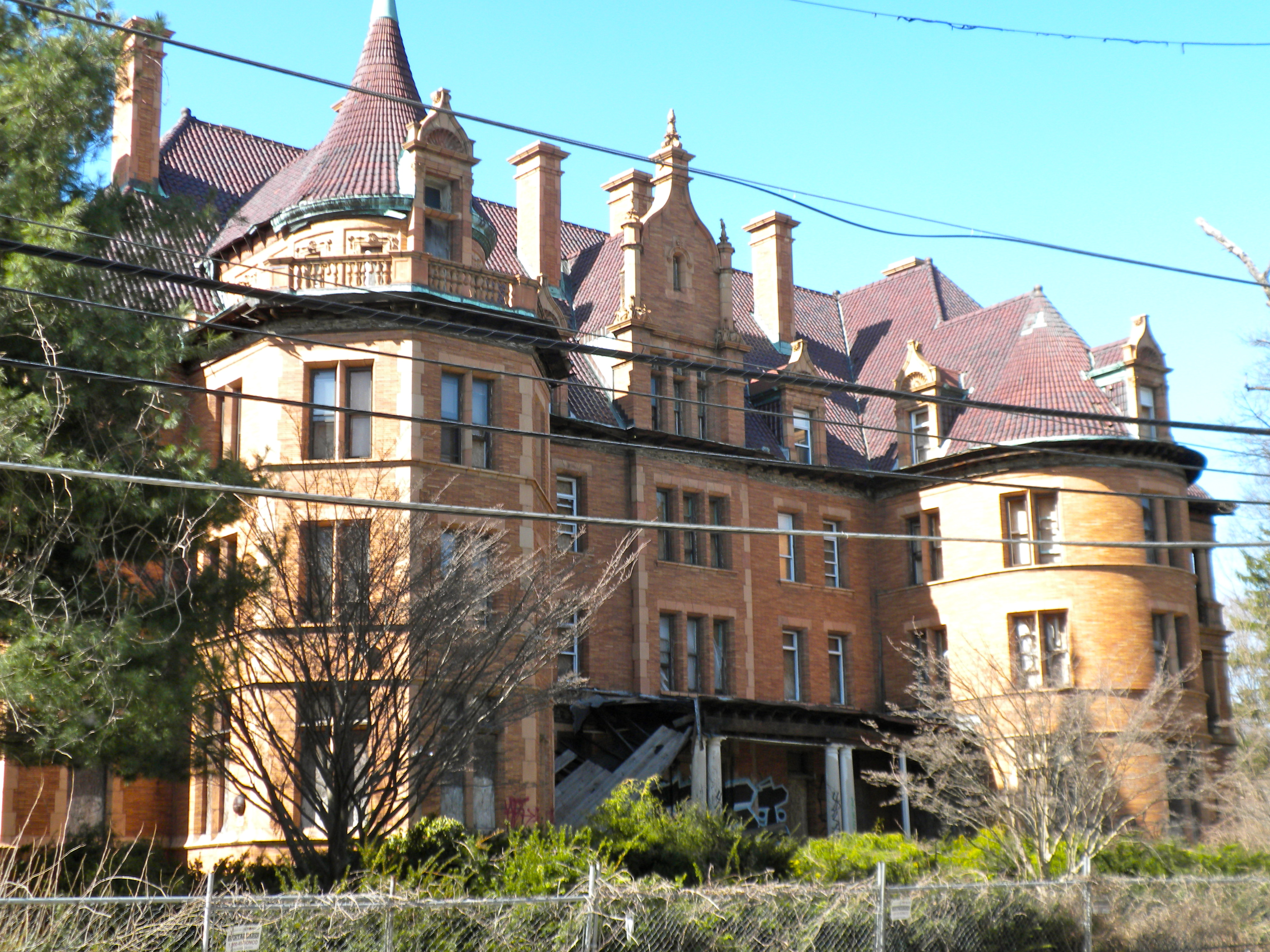

- Location within Philadelphia Location within Pennsylvania Location within the United States
- Location: 221 W. Johnson St., Philadelphia, Pennsylvania
- Coordinates: 40°2′36″N 75°11′13″W
- Area: 2 acres (0.81 ha)
- Built: 1895
- Architect: J. Franklin Stuckert, John W. Gilton, et al.
- Architectural style: Renaissance
- NRHP reference No.: 06000746
- Added to NRHP: August 30, 2006

The Nugent Home for Baptists is an historic, private charity building that is located at 221 W. Johnson Street in Philadelphia, Pennsylvania, United States. According to The New York Times of May 21, 1889:

The Hon. Horatio G. Jones, President of the Trustees of the George Nugent Home for Baptists at Germantown, Philadelphia, announced that the home had a foundation or endowment of $300,000 or $400,000, and was ready to receive all Baptist ministers and their wives over sixty years of age. The inmates are supported for life.

== History and architectural features ==
This Renaissance style building was constructed in 1895 and added to the National Register of Historic Places in 2006.

The building adjoins the Presser Home for Retired Music Teachers, which was also listed on the National Register in 2006. Nolen Properties owns both buildings and has completed restoration of the Presser building, and was working on the restoration of the Nugent building in 2013.
