= McCallum Manor =

- U.S. National Register of Historic Places
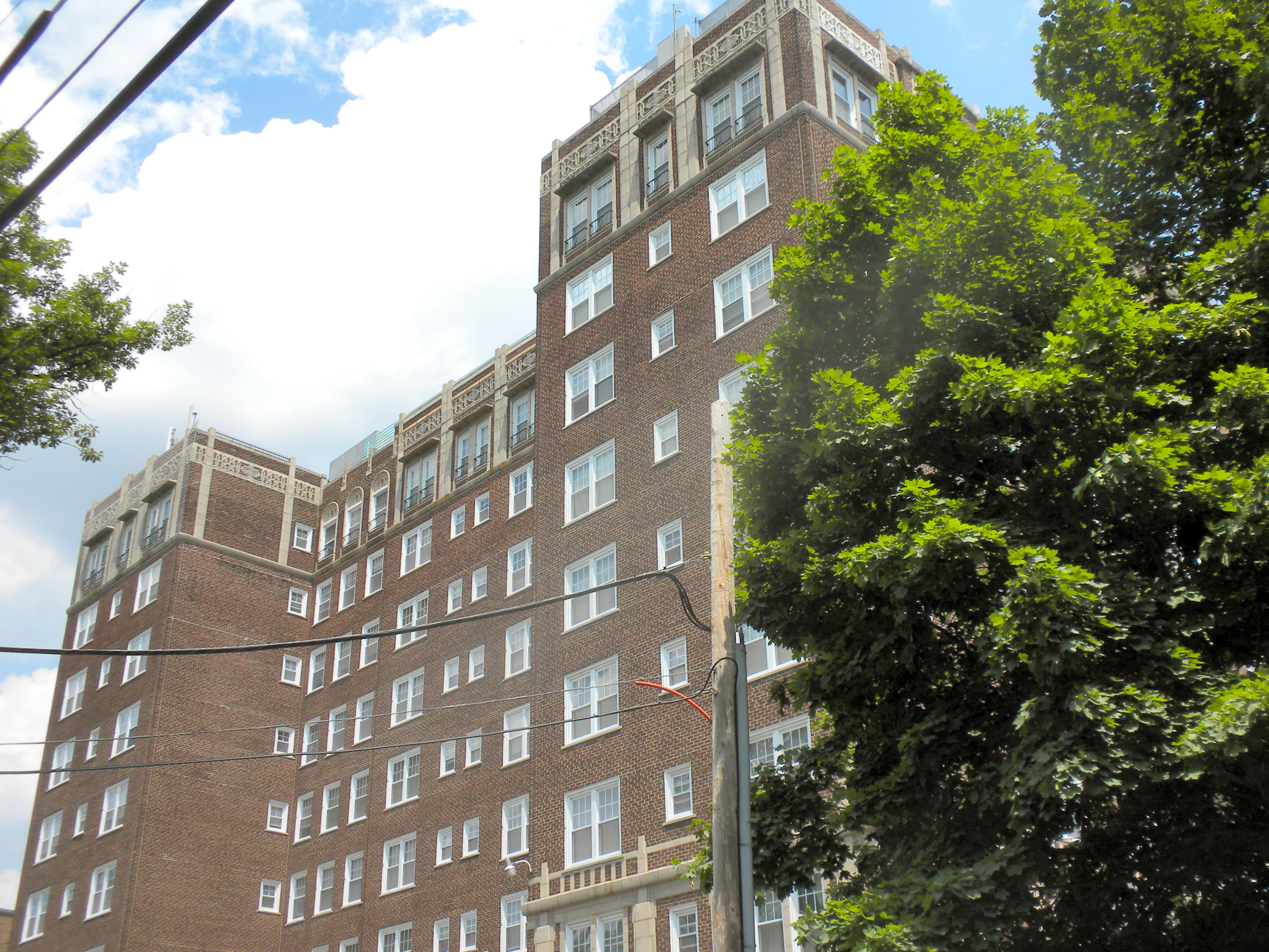
- McCallum Manor, June 2010

- Location within Philadelphia Location within Pennsylvania Location within the United States
- Location: 6635 McCallum Ave., Philadelphia, Pennsylvania
- Coordinates: 40°2′42″N 75°11′31″W
- Area: 0.8 acres (0.32 ha)
- Built: 1925
- Architect: McLanahan & Bencker
- Architectural style: Federal Revival
- NRHP reference No.: 85001000
- Added to NRHP: May 9, 1985

McCallum Manor is a historic apartment building located in the Mount Airy neighborhood of Philadelphia, Pennsylvania. It is located next to Malvern Hall. It was built in 1925, and is a nine-story, H-shaped, reinforced concrete building faced in brick in a Federal Revival-style. It features terra cotta decorative elements.

It was added to the National Register of Historic Places in 1985.
