= George Washington Carpenter =

American scientist (1802–1860)

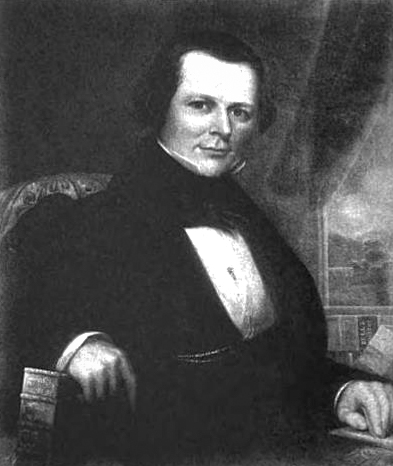
- Born: George Washington Carpenter; 31 July 1802; Germantown, Pennsylvania
- Died: 7 June 1860 (aged 57); Germantown, Pennsylvania
- Citizenship: U.S.A.
- Occupations: American scientist, merchant
- Parent(s): Conrad Carpenter Carpenter; Ann Adams

George Washington Carpenter (July 31, 1802 – June 7, 1860) was an American scientist.

== Early life and education ==
Carpenter was born July 31, 1802, in Germantown, Pennsylvania, a son of Conrad and Ann (Adams) Carpenter, of English-American heritage. He was educated at Germantown Academy, in Germantown, near Philadelphia, Pennsylvania. He received a classical education which prepared him for his professional and scientific pursuits.

== Business career ==
From 1820 through 1828 Carpenter worked as an assistant in a wholesale drug firm in Philadelphia. In 1828 he started his own drug business and engaged in real estate speculation and other business ventures for his primary financial support.

== Scientific contributions ==
While working as an assistant in his first job, he met Thomas Nuttall and developed an interest in the natural sciences which filled his leisure time for the remainder of his life. He was particularly interested in mineralogy, and made extensive collections of minerals which he described and shared with Parker Cleaveland and other notable natural scientists of the day. He authored a number of papers published in the American Journal of Science and the American Journal of the Medical Sciences between 1825 and 1832 dealing with pharmacological matters. He organized his collections into a museum on his Germantown estate, incorporating large collections of specimens relating to all aspects of the natural sciences, and kept specimens of rare plants collected by Nuttall in a greenhouse on his estate. He was elected an associate of the Philadelphia Academy of Natural Sciences, and his 1839 book Essays on Some of the Most Important Articles of the Materia Medica was reprinted in a second edition, and became a textbook.

== Death and legacy ==
Carpenter died June 7, 1860, at Phil-Ellena, his home in Germantown. His widow, Ellen (Douglas) Carpenter, donated his museum collections of natural history items to the Academy of Natural Sciences, and his collection of rare plants to the City of Philadelphia.
