= Manayunk West station =

Former rail station in Pennsylvania

Manayunk West
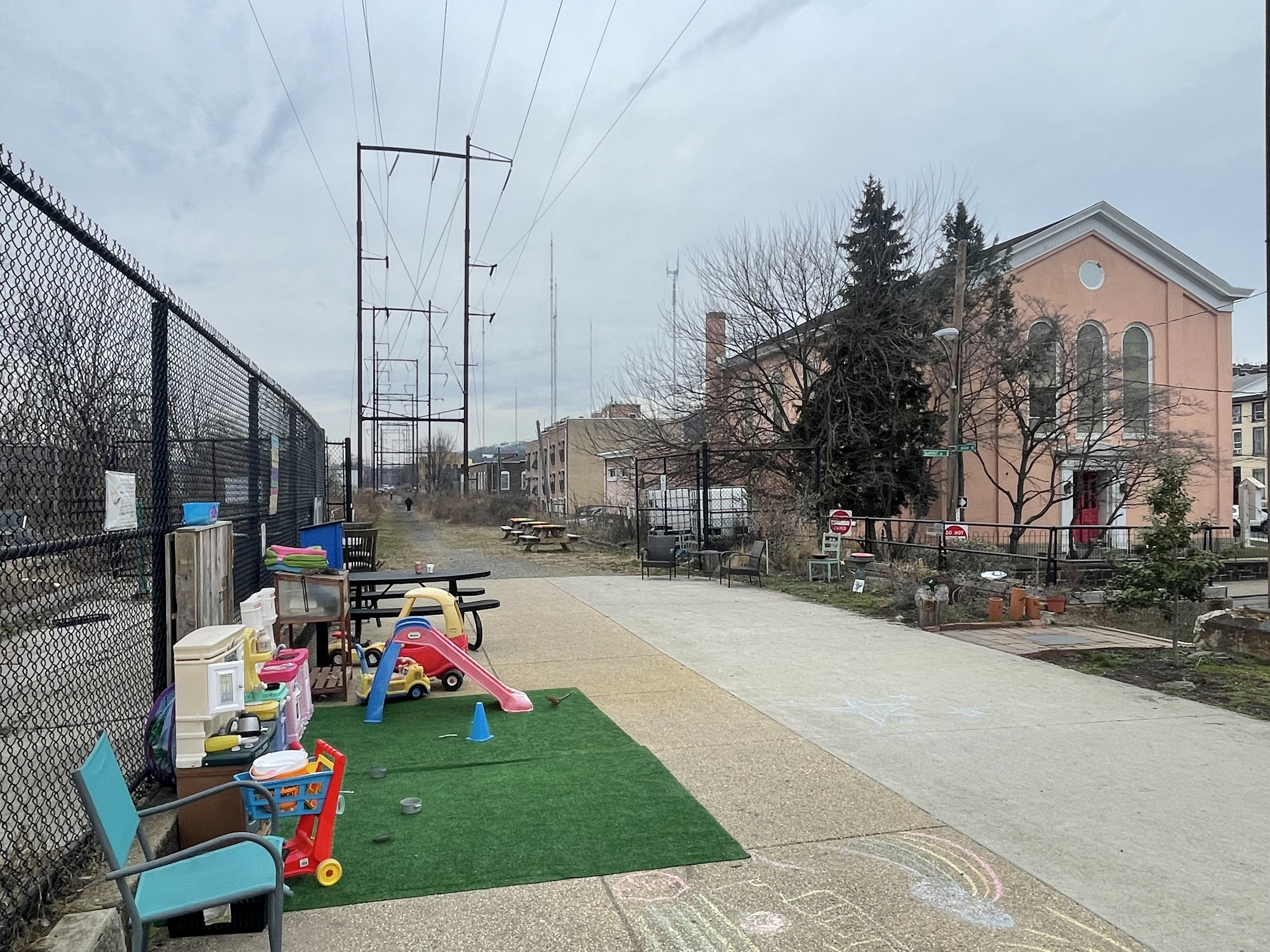
- The site of the former station in 2024; to the rear is the Mt. Zion Fire Baptized Holiness Church. The location is also the end of the Cynwyd Heritage Trail.

General information
- Coordinates: 40.028031°N 75.227822°W
- Line: Schuylkill Branch

History
- Closed: May 16, 1986
- Electrified: July 20, 1930

Former services
Preceding station	SEPTA	Following station
Ivy Ridge Terminus	Ivy Ridge Line	Barmouth toward Suburban Station
Preceding station	Pennsylvania Railroad	Following station
Conshohocken toward Pottsville	Schuylkill Branch	Cynwyd toward Suburban Station
Shawmont toward Norristown–Haws Avenue	Norristown Line	Barmouth toward Suburban Station
Location

Manayunk West, often just Manayunk, was a SEPTA Regional Rail station in Manayunk, Philadelphia. It was located on ex-Pennsylvania Railroad Schuylkill Branch and served by SEPTA's Ivy Ridge Line commuter trains. The station stood at the corner of Dupont and High, a short distance from the ex-Reading Company station at Manayunk. SEPTA suspended service beyond Cynwyd on May 27, 1986, because of poor track conditions and concerns about the Manayunk Bridge. The station has since been demolished.
