= Barmouth station (SEPTA) =

Railway station in Lower Merion, Pennsylvania

Barmouth
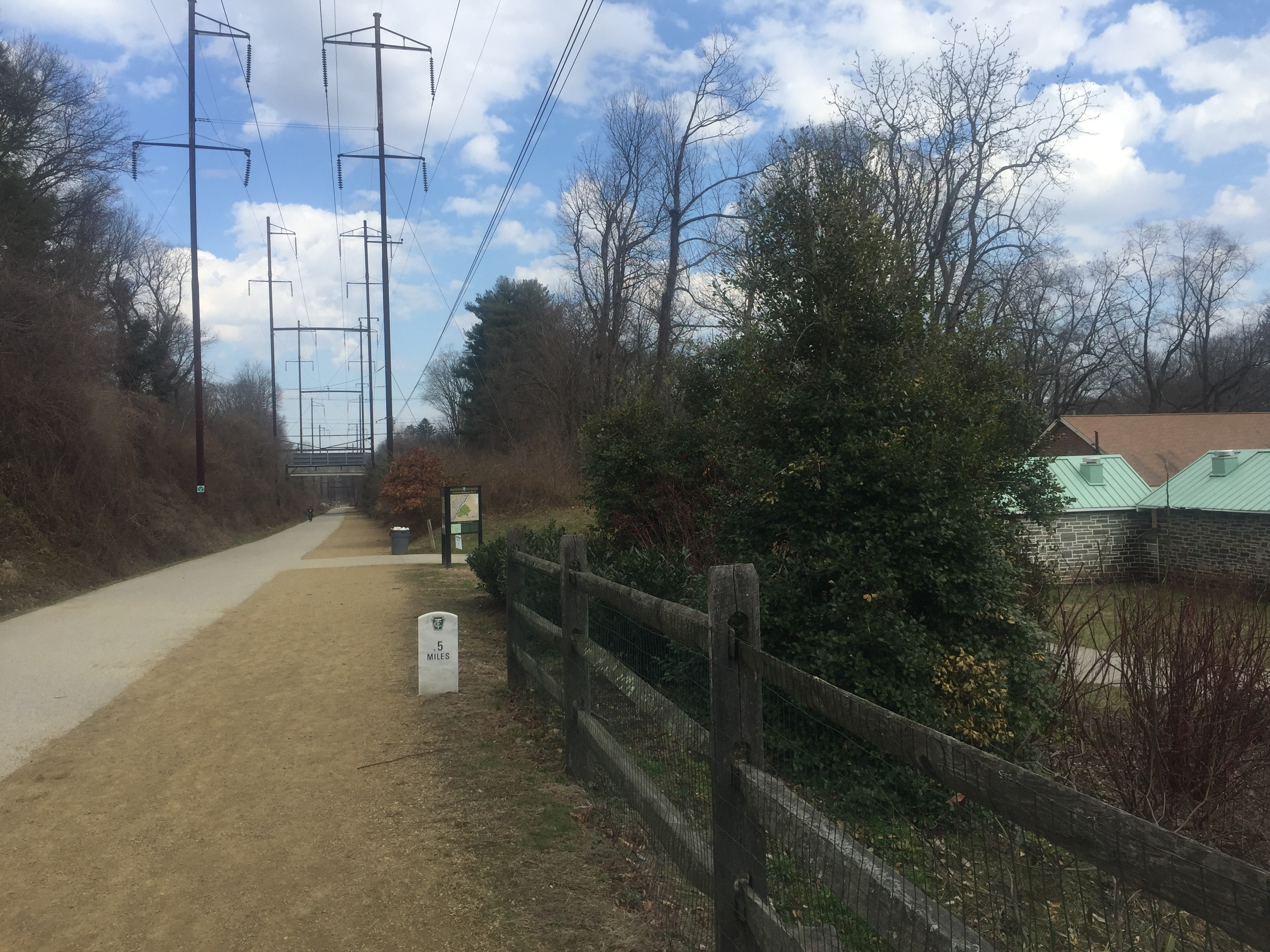
- The former station site on the Cynwyd Heritage Trail in 2018

General information
- Location: East Levering Mill Road; Lower Merion, Pennsylvania
- Coordinates: 40.0161°N 75.2274°W
- Platforms: 2 (demolished)
- Tracks: 2

Construction
- Structure type: Shelters (demolished)
- Accessible: No

History
- Closed: May 16, 1986
- Electrified: July 20, 1930

Former services
Preceding station	SEPTA	Following station
Manayunk West toward Ivy Ridge	Ivy Ridge Line	Cynwyd toward Suburban Station
Preceding station	Pennsylvania Railroad	Following station
Manayunk toward Norristown–Haws Avenue	Norristown Line	Cynwyd toward Suburban Station
Location

Barmouth station was a railroad station in Lower Merion, Pennsylvania. Located on East Levering Mill Road, the station was a stop on the Pennsylvania Railroad's Schuylkill Branch, and later became a part of SEPTA's Ivy Ridge Line (then called R6 Ivy Ridge).

The station, and all of those north of Cynwyd station, was closed in May 1986 when the integrity of the Pencoyd Viaduct crossing the Schuylkill River and Schuylkill Expressway was questioned. In 2009, SEPTA leased the line to Lower Merion Township, who dismantled the tracks for the Cynwyd Heritage Trail. The last remnants of the station, the platforms and a stone shelter, were demolished in 2011 to make room for the trail parking lot.

The Barmouth station site bisects West Laurel Hill Cemetery and Westminster Cemetery.
