= Manayunk station =

Railway station in Philadelphia

Manayunk
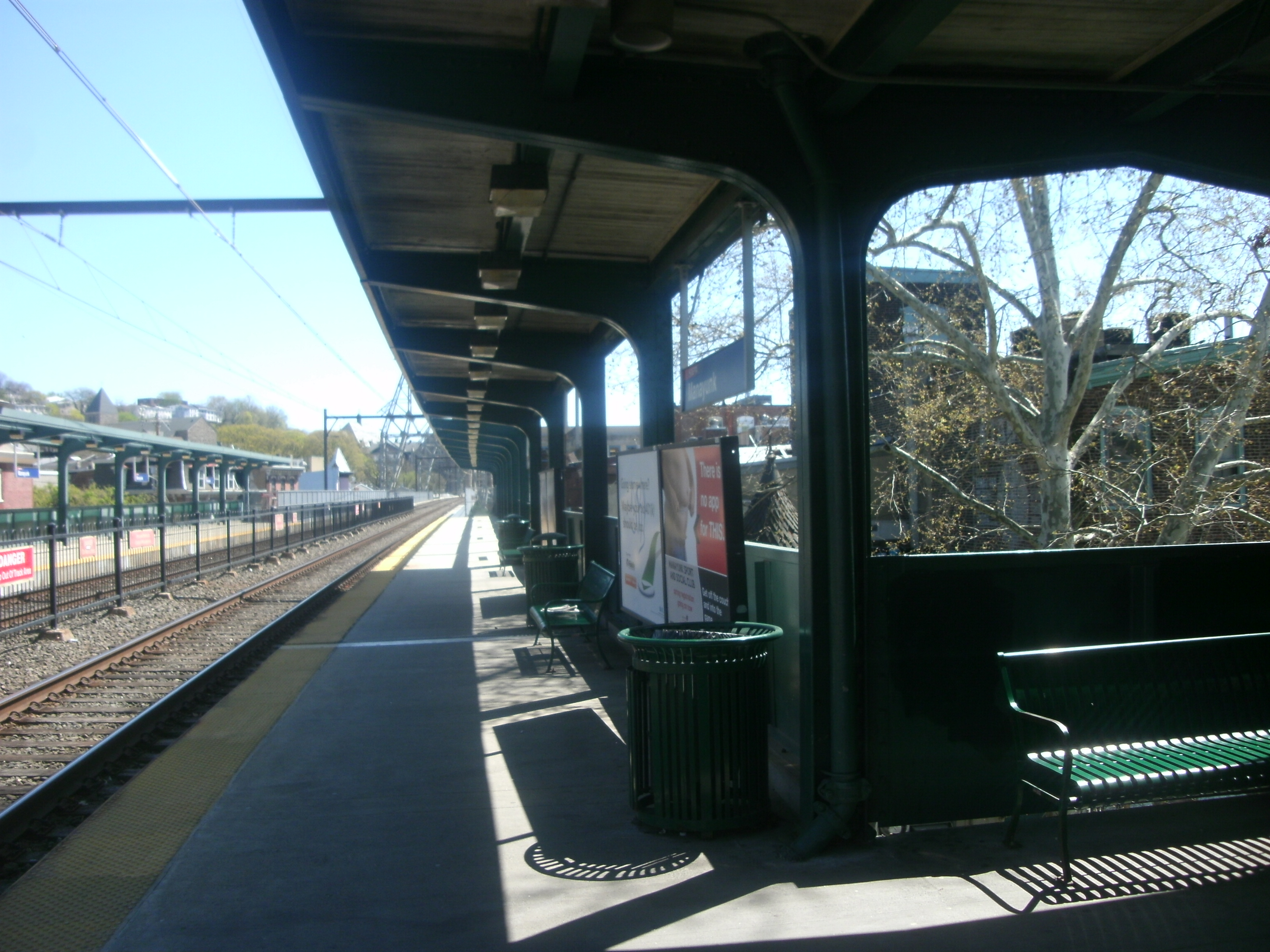
- Manayunk station in downtown Manayunk as seen on the Center City-bound platform, April 2012

General information
- Location: 4402 Cresson Street; Manayunk, Philadelphia, Pennsylvania
- Coordinates: 40.0269°N 75.2253°W
- Owner: SEPTA
- Line: Norristown Branch
- Platforms: 2 side platforms
- Tracks: 2
- Connections: SEPTA City Bus: 61

Construction
- Parking: no
- Accessible: No

Other information
- Fare zone: 2

History
- Electrified: February 5, 1933

Passengers
- 2017: 723 boardings 571 alightings (weekday average)
- Rank: 30 of 146

Services
Preceding station	SEPTA	Following station
Ivy Ridge toward Norristown–Elm Street	Manayunk/Norristown Line	Wissahickon toward Penn Medicine Station
Former services
Preceding station	Reading Railroad	Following station
Conshohocken toward Pottsville	Main Line	Wissahickon toward Philadelphia
Glen Willow toward Elm Street	Norristown Branch	Wissahickon toward Philadelphia
Location

Manayunk station is a station located along the SEPTA Manayunk/Norristown rail line. It is located at Cresson and Carson Streets in the Manayunk neighborhood of northwest Philadelphia, Pennsylvania. In FY 2013, Manayunk station had a weekday average of 654 boardings and 563 alightings.

== History ==
The original Manayunk station was built by the Philadelphia, Germantown and Norristown Railroad (PG&N) in 1834, a predecessor of Reading Railroad (RDG). It was located on Green Lane near the corner of Main Street.

When the Pennsylvania Railroad (PRR) built the Schuylkill Branch they also built their own Manayunk station at the foot of the massive Pencoyd Viaduct (on the corner of Dupont and High Streets). After SEPTA was formed by the combination of RDG and PRR, this station was designated West Manayunk, and then Manayunk West, a station on the Cynwyd Line, until May 1986 when the line was cut back to its present terminus.

Following the construction of PRR's Manayunk station, the Reading Railroad (RDG) demolished their own station, in 1884, and replaced it with a new station at the intersection of Cresson and Roxborough Streets. This third Manayunk station was built at street level, much like the original station and the nearby competition.

The fourth and current station was built by Reading in 1930 as part of a grade-separation project which eliminated running down the middle of Cresson Street. The station opened on September 12, 1930.

The line near Manayunk station serves as part of the border for the Manayunk Main Street Historic District, which has been on the National Register of Historic Places since 1993.
