= Bala station (SEPTA) =

SEPTA Regional Rail station

Bala
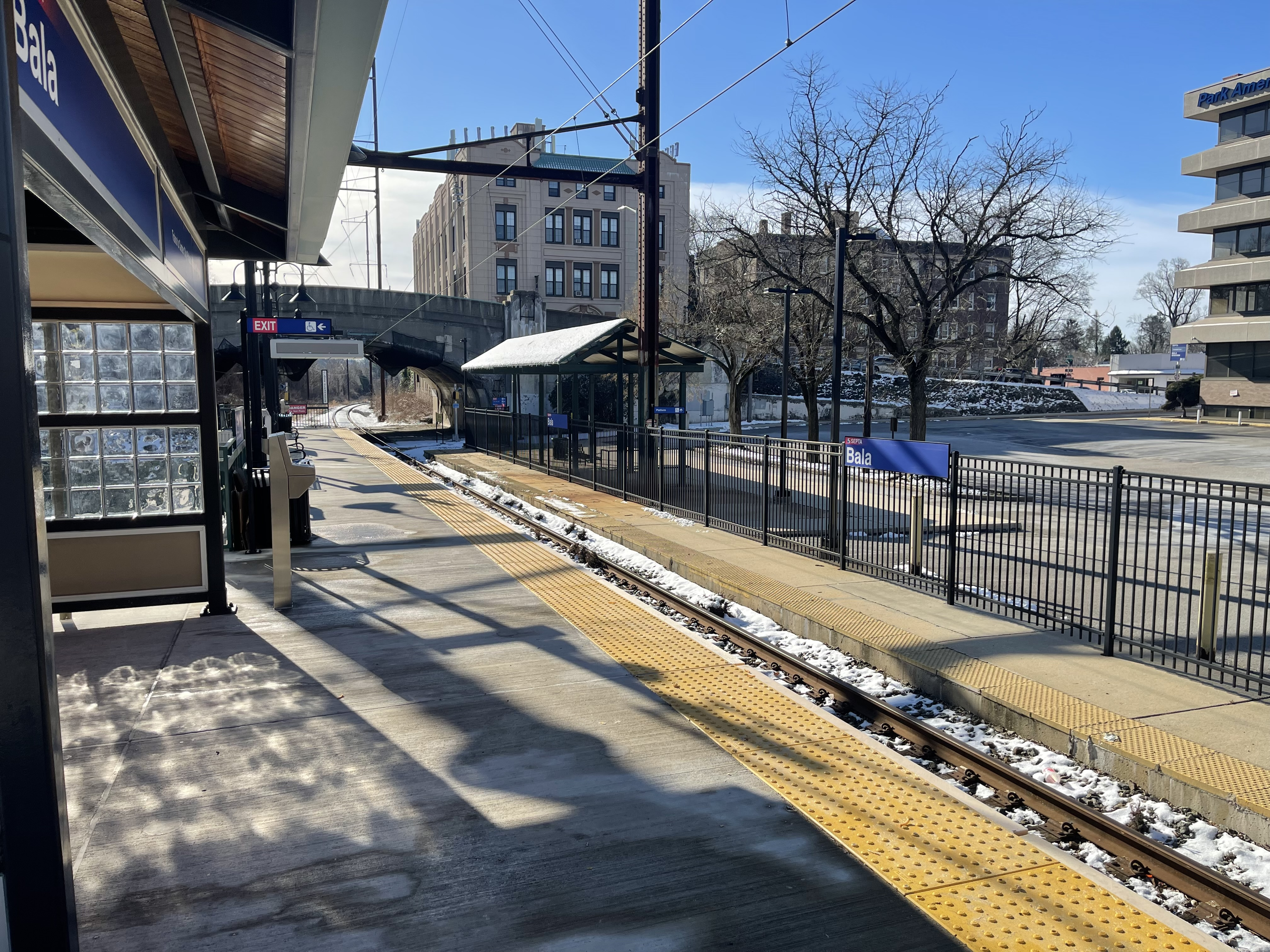
- Bala station platform in 2024.

General information
- Location: City Avenue (U.S. Route 1) and Bala Avenue; Bala Cynwyd, Lower Merion Township, Pennsylvania
- Coordinates: 40°00′04″N 75°13′40″W
- Owner: SEPTA
- Platforms: 1 side platform
- Tracks: 1
- Connections: SEPTA City Bus: 1, 44, 52, 65

Construction
- Parking: 59 spaces
- Accessible: Yes

Other information
- Station code: 90002
- Fare zone: 2

History
- Opened: April 1, 1884
- Electrified: 1930

Services
Preceding station	SEPTA	Following station
Cynwyd Terminus	Cynwyd Line	Wynnefield Avenue toward Suburban Station
Former services
Preceding station	SEPTA	Following station
Cynwyd toward Ivy Ridge	Ivy Ridge Line	Wynnefield Avenue toward Suburban Station
Preceding station	Pennsylvania Railroad	Following station
Cynwyd toward Norristown–Haws Avenue	Norristown Line	Wynnefield Avenue toward Suburban Station
Location

Bala station is an active commuter railroad station in the Bala Cynwyd neighborhood of Lower Merion Township, Montgomery County, Pennsylvania. Located on City Avenue (U.S. Route 1) between Bala Avenue and Conshohocken State Road (State Route 23), the station services trains of SEPTA Regional Rail's Cynwyd Line. Bala station consists of two high-level side platforms and a pair of small parking lots, accessible from City Avenue and Conshohocken State Road.

Bala station opened with the Pennsylvania Railroad's Schuylkill Branch on April 1, 1884. The station was built part of property once owned by the Stadelman family in the old Dog Hill neighborhood. The president of the railroad, George Brooke Roberts, picked the name Bala for the station in honor of Bala in Wales to honor an ancestor's Welsh heritage.
