= Cynwyd station (SEPTA) =

SEPTA Regional Rail station

Cynwyd
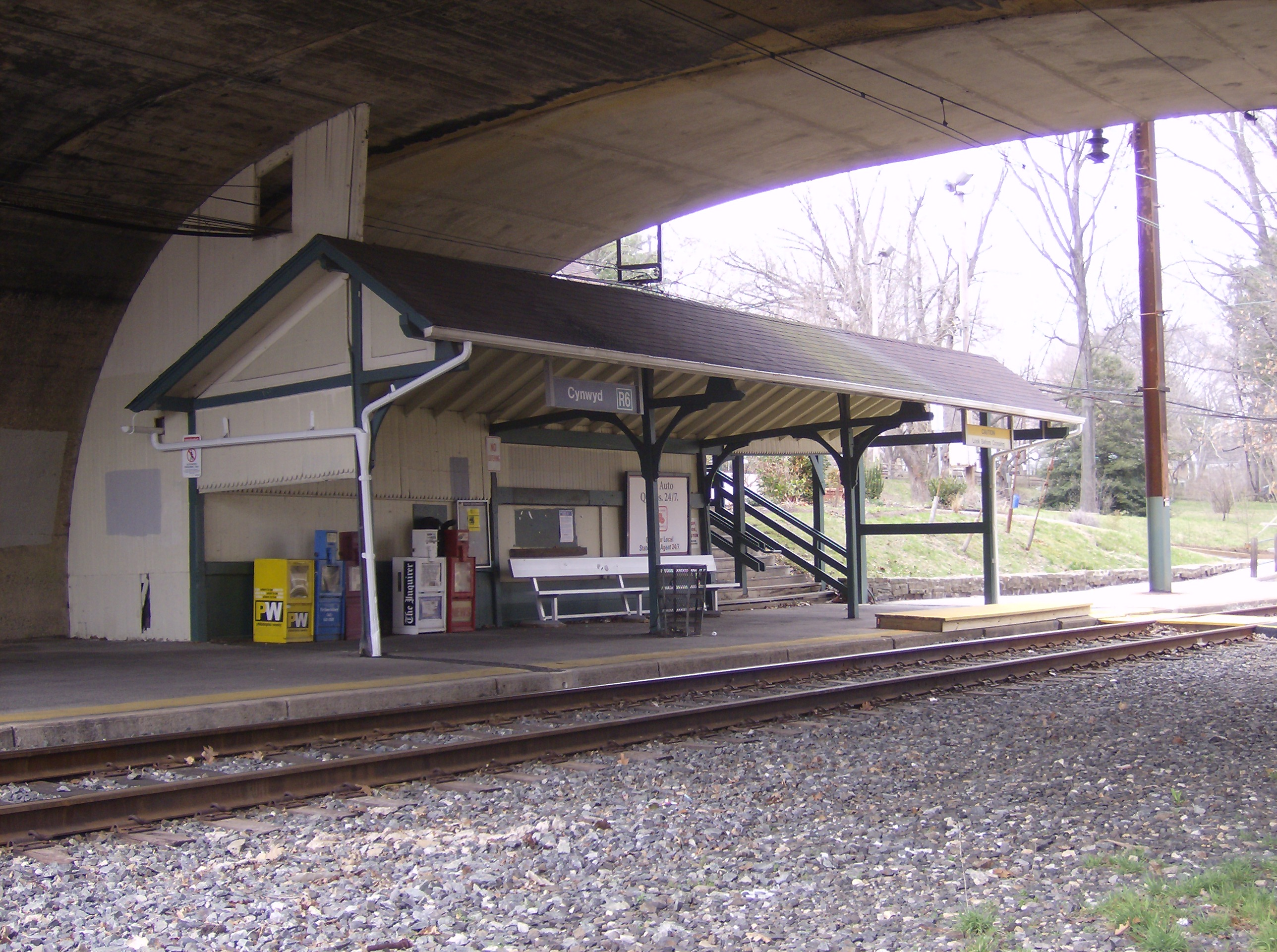
- Cynwyd station platform

General information
- Location: 1 East Montgomery Avenue; Bala Cynwyd, Pennsylvania
- Coordinates: 40°00′24″N 75°13′55″W
- Owner: SEPTA
- Platforms: 1 side platform
- Tracks: 1
- Connections: SEPTA City Bus: 44, 52; Cynwyd Heritage Trail

Construction
- Parking: 17 spaces
- Cycle facilities: 2 rack spaces
- Accessible: Yes

Other information
- Fare zone: 2

History
- Opened: 1890
- Electrified: 1930

Services
Preceding station	SEPTA	Following station
Terminus	Cynwyd Line	Bala toward Suburban Station
Former services
Preceding station	SEPTA	Following station
Barmouth toward Ivy Ridge	Ivy Ridge Line	Bala toward Suburban Station
Preceding station	Pennsylvania Railroad	Following station
Manayunk toward Pottsville	Schuylkill Branch	52nd Street toward Suburban Station
Barmouth toward Norristown–Haws Avenue	Norristown Line	Bala toward Suburban Station
Track layout
Location

Cynwyd station is a SEPTA Regional Rail station in Bala Cynwyd, Pennsylvania. Located at Conshohocken State Road (PA 23) and Bala Avenue, it is the last station along the Cynwyd Line. The station includes a 41-space parking lot.

Service formerly continued farther northwest, crossing the Schuylkill River via the massive Manayunk Bridge, and ultimately terminating at Ivy Ridge station. This service ended in September 1986 when the integrity of the Manayunk Bridge was questioned. The massive span was shedding pieces of concrete due to spalling. Further investigation by Urban Engineers determined that the bridge was safe and only needed surface work to end the spalling. In 1999, construction finished on a project to stabilize and refurbish the bridge, but train service did not resume as expected.

SEPTA received criticism for refusing to reinstate service north of Cynwyd after the Manayunk Bridge was deemed safe. Plans to re-extend service floated around for approximately a decade until 2008 when SEPTA dismantled the line north of Cynwyd after leasing the line for the Cynwyd Heritage Trail and Ivy Ridge Trail, respectively.
