= Ivy Ridge station =

SEPTA Regional Rail station

Ivy Ridge
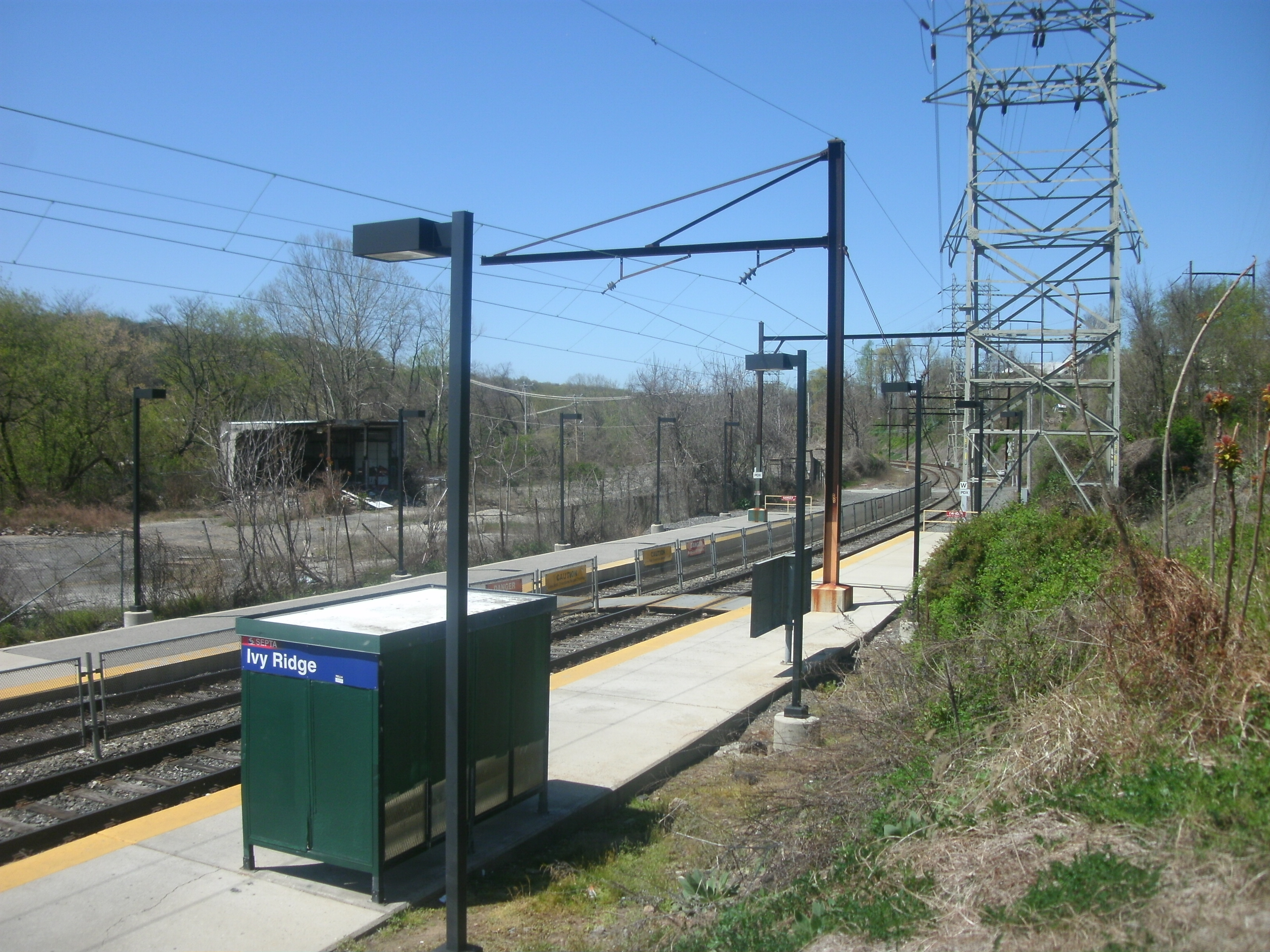
- Ivy Ridge station in April 2012

General information
- Location: 4910 Umbria Street; Philadelphia, Pennsylvania 19128
- Coordinates: 40.0341°N 75.2355°W
- Owner: SEPTA
- Line: Norristown Branch
- Platforms: 2 side platforms
- Tracks: 2
- Connections: SEPTA City Bus: 61

Construction
- Accessible: No

Other information
- Fare zone: 2

History
- Opened: October 6, 1980 (SEPTA Ivy Ridge Line); August 25, 1986 (SEPTA Manayunk/Norristown Line)
- Closed: May 16, 1986 (SEPTA Ivy Ridge Line)
- Electrified: July 20, 1930 (Pennsylvania); February 5, 1933 (Reading)

Passengers
- 2017: 703 boardings 782 alightings (weekday average)
- Rank: 32 of 146

Services
Preceding station	SEPTA	Following station
Miquon toward Norristown–Elm Street	Manayunk/Norristown Line	Manayunk toward Penn Medicine Station
Shawmont Closed 1996 toward Norristown–Elm Street	Manayunk/Norristown Line	Manayunk toward Penn Medicine Station
Former services
Preceding station	SEPTA	Following station
Terminus	Ivy Ridge Line	Manayunk West toward Suburban Station
Location

Ivy Ridge station is a SEPTA Regional Rail station in Philadelphia, Pennsylvania. Located at Umbria Street and Parker Avenue in Northwest Philadelphia, it serves the Manayunk/Norristown Line. The initial station was built in a minimalist design similar to that of Elm Street, Norristown. The current station has a 204-space parking lot. In FY 2013, Ivy Ridge station had a weekday average of 602 boardings and 582 alightings.

== History ==
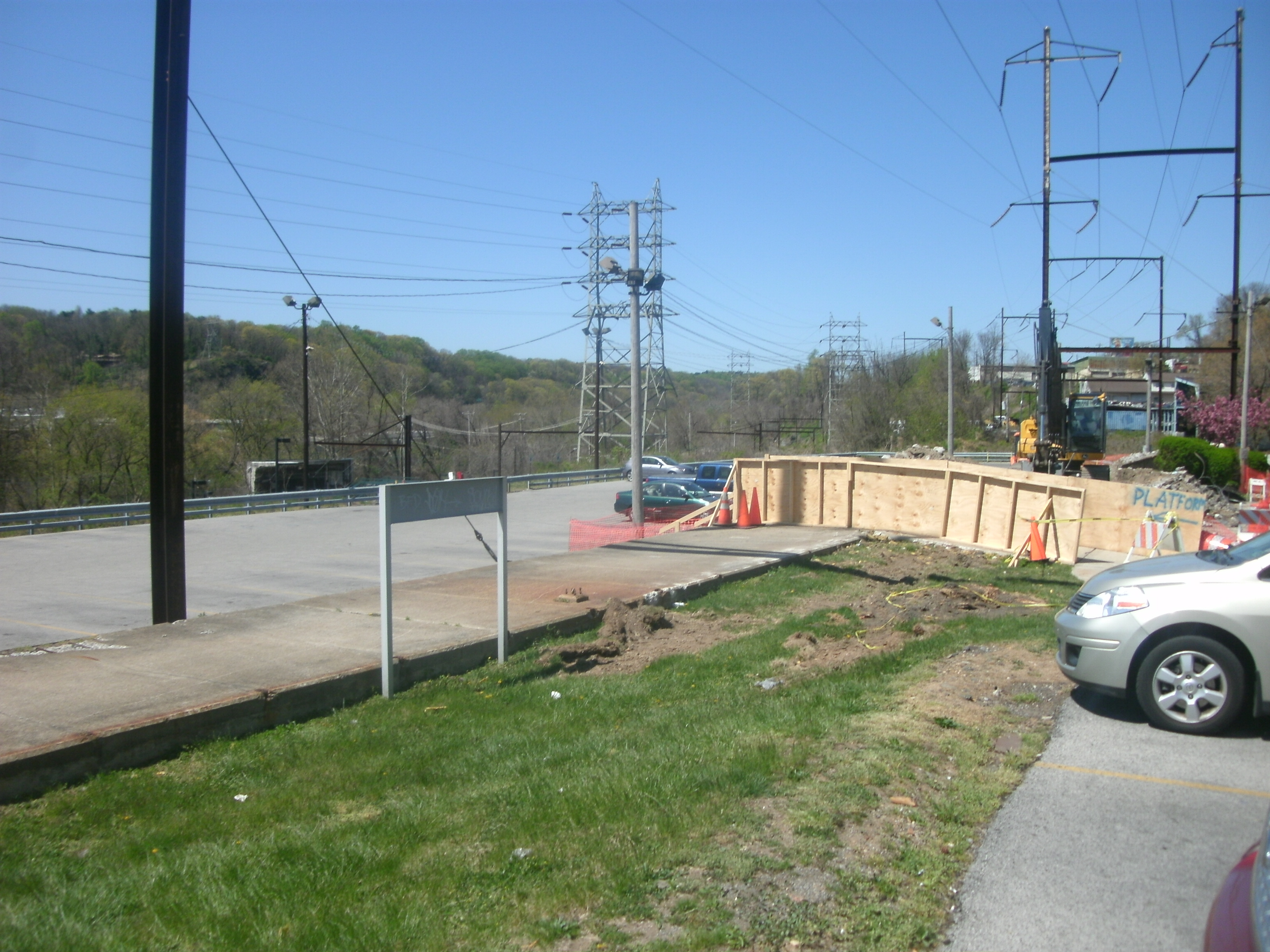
Demolition of out-of-service station platform, April 8, 2012

SEPTA constructed Ivy Ridge in 1980 when service was extended an additional 0.8 miles (1.3 km) past Manayunk West station, the passenger terminus of the Pennsylvania Railroad's (PRR) Schuylkill Branch since 1960. Up until then, the 0.8 miles (1.3 km) of track had been used by Manayunk trains to change direction within a remotely controlled interlocking where the Schuylkill Branch (by that time, abandoned north of this point) went from two tracks to one. The single-platform Ivy Ridge station was constructed within the space occupied by the abandoned second track, removed in the early 1960s after the PRR discontinued passenger service to Norristown. A moderate-sized park-and-ride lot was included.

SEPTA suspended service beyond Cynwyd in March 1986 because of deteriorating track conditions and concerns about the Manayunk Bridge; a shuttle bus ran from Manayunk on the Manayunk/Norristown Line. In August SEPTA constructed the current platforms along the ex-Reading Norristown line down the bluff from the ex-Pennsylvania line. For a while, the park-and-ride lot sat unused until SEPTA erected a 39-step stairway connecting the derelict PRR upper level and RDG lower level station sites. In the beginning, the steep staircase discouraged ridership, but this changed as ridership grew in the 1990s.

While the PRR platform was built to high level standards (a rarity on the SEPTA Regional Rail system), and was constructed before the Americans with Disabilities Act of 1990, the hastily constructed RDG station platform are low level. The derelict upper level platform was eventually demolished in April 2012.

As it became clear that SEPTA had no interest in reviving service to the upper Ivy Ridge station, the parking lot was expanded with sections of the PRR track being removed. All remaining Schuylkill Branch trackage in Manayunk was dismantled in June 2010 to make way for the Ivy Ridge Trail, a Philadelphia extension of the Cynwyd Heritage Trail over the Manayunk Bridge.
