= Mo Lisby =

American baseball player

- Pitcher
- Born: September 17, 1912; Manayunk, Pennsylvania, U.S.
- Died: September 6, 1995 (aged 82); Jamaica, New York, U.S.
- Batted: Both Threw: Left

Negro league baseball debut
- 1934, for the Bacharach Giants

Last appearance
- 1934, for the Newark Dodgers

Teams
- Bacharach Giants (1934); Newark Dodgers (1934)

Maurice Charles Lisby (September 17, 1912 – September 6, 1995) was an American Negro league pitcher in the 1930s.

A native of Manayunk, Pennsylvania, Lisby attended Morgan State University and played for the Bacharach Giants and the Newark Dodgers in 1934. He died in Jamaica, New York in 1995 at age 82.
