= Paul Cava =

American photographer

Paul Cava (born 1949 in Brooklyn, New York) is an American artist/photographer and private photography dealer and publisher. He currently lives and works in Bala Cynwyd, Pennsylvania. He received his BA in Cinematography from Richmond College of the City University of New York in 1972 and his MFA in Photography from the Rochester Institute of Technology in 1975. As a fine artist Cava has exhibited paintings, drawings and photo-based works from 1976 to the present in galleries and museums in the United States and Europe. His work has been collected by private and public institutions, including The Museum of Fine Arts, Houston, The Philadelphia Museum of Art, The Princeton University Museum of Art, The Pennsylvania Convention Center, and The Bibliothèque Nationale, Paris. His work has been showcased in numerous publications including Still Modern After All These Years, Chrysler Museum, Eyemazing Magazine and Invisible City: Philadelphia and the Vernacular Avant-garde. Cava was awarded Pennsylvania Council on the Arts grants in 1981 and 1999. In fall 2005, the German publisher Galerie Vevais released Children of Adam, a volume combining Cava’s photo-based art with Walt Whitman’s erotic poetry. Cava's work has been collected by The Museum of Fine Arts, Houston, The Philadelphia Museum of Art, The Princeton University Museum of Art, and The Bibliothèque Nationale, Paris. Cava is also notable for his two decades (1979–1999) of owning and operating the Paul Cava Gallery in Philadelphia. His gallery exhibited work by various artists including Robert Mapplethorpe, Ray Metzker, Joel-Peter Witkin, Lynn Davis, Jock Sturges, Irving Penn, Sean Scully, Jannis Kounellis, Mel Bochner, and Richard Misrach.

== Publications ==
- Corona Interiors / Paul Cava, 2023
- Paul Cava: Photographs, Collages and Montages, 2020
- Democratic Vistas: Whitman, Body & Soul, Stedman Gallery, 2019
- Collodion Visions: Large Plate Tintypes From The Collection of Paul Cava, Bala Cynwyd, PA, 2010
- Eyemazing Magazine, Issue 03-2009, Portfolio of tintype collection with interview
- Eyemazing Magazine, Issue 02-2006, Cover and portfolio
- Walt Whitman & Paul Cava, Children of Adam from Leaves of Grass, edition Galerie Vevais, Germany in 2005
- Paul Cava, Recent Work, Seraphin Gallery in 2001
- Love and Desire, Curated and edited by William Ewing in 1999
- Paul Cava, Paintings and Drawings, Ganser Gallery, Millersville University in 1997
- Tradition And The Unpredictable, The Museum of Fine Arts, Houston, Texas in 1994
- Searching Out The Best, Pennsylvania Academy of The Fine Arts, Philadelphia, Pennsylvania in 1988
- Still Modern After All These Years, Chrysler Museum, Norfolk, Virginia in 1982
