= Cynwyd Line =

SEPTA Regional Rail service

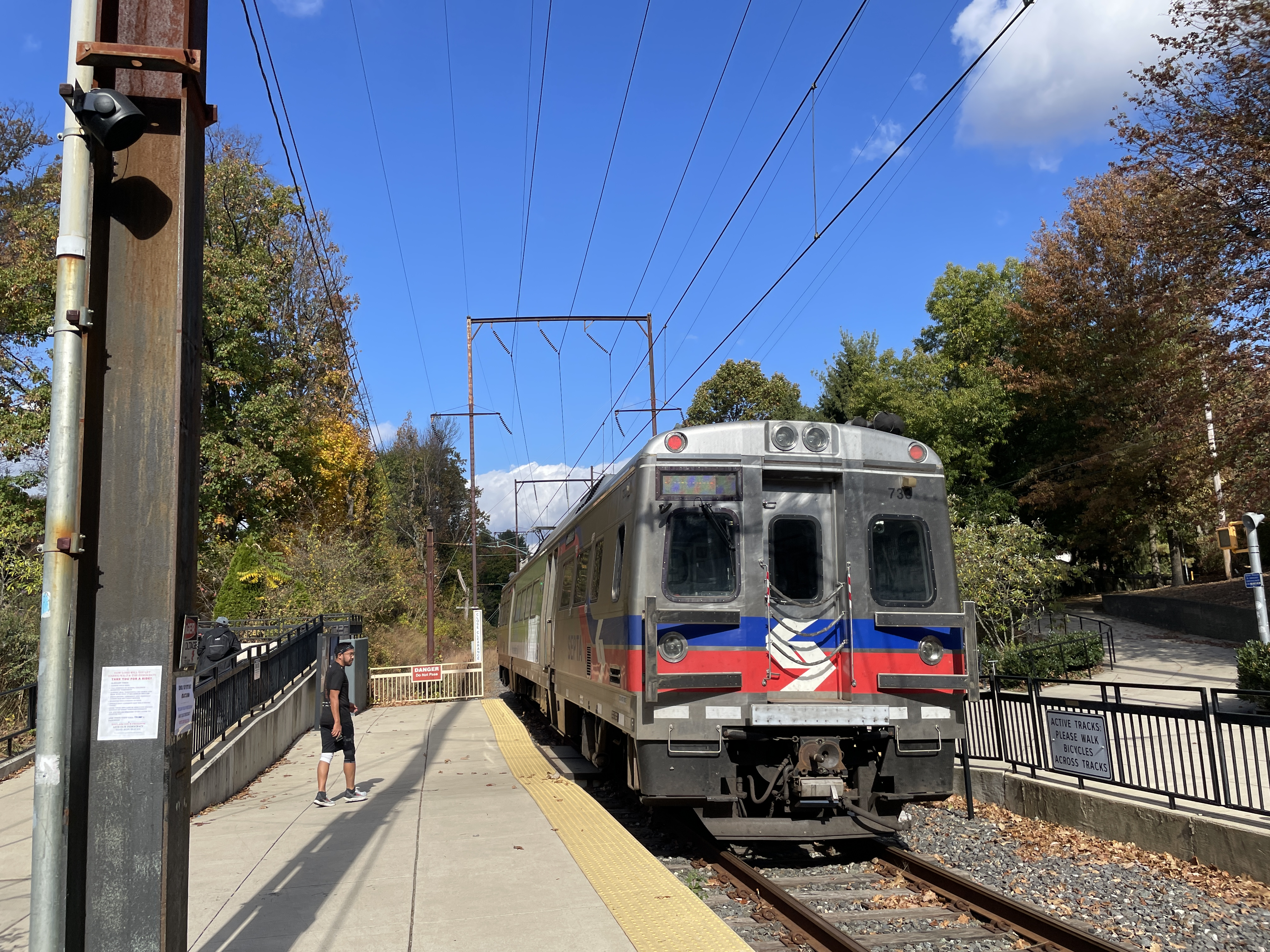
- Silverliner train at Cynwyd station (November 2024)

Overview
- Status: Operating
- Owner: SEPTA
- Termini: Suburban Station; Cynwyd
- Stations: 5
- Website: septa.org

Service
- Type: Commuter rail
- System: SEPTA Regional Rail
- Services: 1
- Operator: SEPTA Regional Rail
- Rolling stock: Electric Multiple Units
- Daily ridership: 220 (FY 2025)

Technical
- Track gauge: 4 ft 8 1/2 in (1,435 mm) standard gauge
- Electrification: Overhead line, 12 kV 25 Hz AC

The Cynwyd Line is a SEPTA Regional Rail line from Center City Philadelphia to Cynwyd in Montgomery County, Pennsylvania. Originally known as the Ivy Ridge Line, service was truncated on May 17, 1986, at its current terminus at Cynwyd.

Track between Cynwyd and Ivy Ridge was dismantled between 2008 and 2010 for conversion as an interim rail trail, preventing service restoration for the foreseeable future. The Cynwyd Line is the shortest of the SEPTA regional rail lines, and is the second-shortest regional rail line in the United States after New Jersey Transit's Princeton Branch. It is by far the least ridden SEPTA Regional Rail Line. It is fully grade-separated.

== Route ==
The Cynwyd Line runs from Suburban Station to the 52nd Street Junction, where it diverges from Amtrak's Philadelphia-to-Harrisburg line. It makes station stops at Wynnefield Avenue, Bala, and Cynwyd before stopping just short of the Schuylkill River.

== History ==

The Cynwyd Line is the truncated remnant of the Pennsylvania Railroad's Schuylkill Branch, which ran from Philadelphia to Pottsville, Pennsylvania. Electrified service was opened between Philadelphia and Norristown (Haws Avenue) on June 20, 1930. Plans for electrification beyond Norristown, to Phoenixville, were not carried out. Passenger service ended between Manayunk and Norristown on October 29, 1960 and the line beyond Manayunk was de-electrified, although the pylons remain.

In 1980 SEPTA extended service from Manayunk to a new park-and-ride station at Ivy Ridge.

Service beyond Cynwyd was suspended on May 27, 1986, because of poor track conditions and concerns about the Manayunk Bridge over the Schuylkill River.

Between 1984–2010, the route was designated R6 Ivy Ridge (later R6 Cynwyd) as part of SEPTA's diametrical reorganization of its lines. Ivy Ridge Line trains operated through the city center to the Manayunk/Norristown Line on the ex-Reading side of the system. The R-number naming system was dropped on July 25, 2010.

In the late 1990s and up to 2003, SEPTA funded a study called the Schuylkill Valley Metro which included plans to extend both sides of the R6 line to Pottstown, Reading and Wyomissing, Pennsylvania. The project suffered a major setback when it was rejected by the FTA New Starts program, which cited doubts about the ridership projections and financing assumptions used by the study.

Though there have been repeated calls to restore the "temporarily" discontinued service between Cynwyd and Ivy Ridge, SEPTA permanently dropped plans for restoration in 2008 when all trackage north of Cynwyd to Ivy Ridge was removed between 2008 and June 2010 to make way for the Cynwyd Heritage Trail and Ivy Ridge Trail.

On October 29, 2010, the Cynwyd Line was where the Silverliner V rail cars made their first run in revenue service, and, on June 29, 2012, where the final Silverliner IIs and IIIs ran in revenue service before being fully retired.

SEPTA activated positive train control on the Cynwyd Line on November 21, 2016.

On April 9, 2020, the line was suspended indefinitely due to a staff shortage caused by the COVID-19 pandemic. Limited service resumed on September 7, 2021.

Following the Interstate 95 bridge collapse on June 11, 2023, SEPTA used vehicles and human resources from Cynwyd Line to operate additional services on Trenton Line, West Trenton Line, and Fox Chase Line starting June 12. Rail services on Cynwyd Line were replaced by buses running to Overbrook station and connecting to Paoli/Thorndale Line trains. Train service on the Cynwyd Line resumed on June 26, 2023.

=== Incident ===
On November 14, 2013, a New York-bound Amtrak Keystone Service train, which carried 130 riders, accidentally reversed onto the Cynwyd Line from 30th Street Station.

== Stations ==
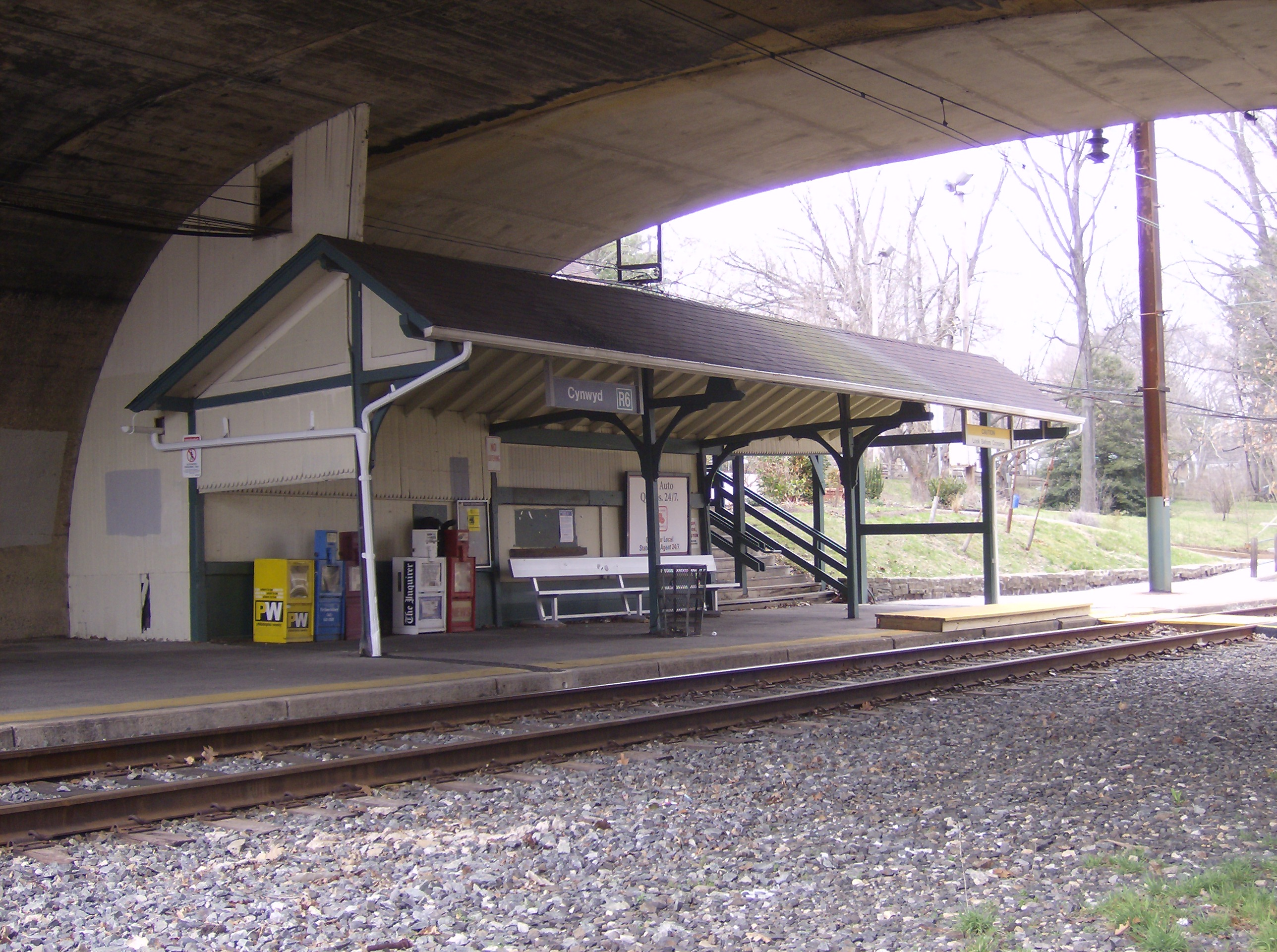
Cynwyd has been the terminus of the line since 1986.

The Cynwyd Line includes the following stations north of 30th Street Station; stations indicated with gray background are closed.

Zone	Location	Station	Miles (km) from Center City	Connections / notes
C	Parkside, Philadelphia	52nd Street	4.0 (6.4)	Closed August 23, 1980
1	Wynnefield, Philadelphia	Wynnefield Avenue	4.9 (7.9)	SEPTA City Bus: 40
2	Bala Cynwyd	Bala	5.7 (9.2)	SEPTA City Bus: 1, 44, 52, 65
2	Bala Cynwyd	Cynwyd	6.1 (9.8)	SEPTA City Bus: 44, 52; Cynwyd Heritage Trail
2	Bala Cynwyd	Barmouth	6.8 (10.9)	Closed May 27, 1986
2	Manayunk, Philadelphia	Manayunk West	7.8 (12.6)	Closed May 27, 1986
2	Roxborough, Philadelphia	Ivy Ridge	8.5 (13.7)	Closed May 27, 1986

== Ridership ==
Between FY 2013–FY 2019, yearly ridership on the Cynwyd Line ranged from 120,000 to 180,000, peaking at 184,138 in FY 2014. Ridership collapsed during the COVID-19 pandemic. (Note: Data for individual lines is not available for FY 2020. Service did not resume until FY 2022.)
