= Bala Cynwyd, Pennsylvania =

Unincorporated community in Pennsylvania, US

- Census-designated place
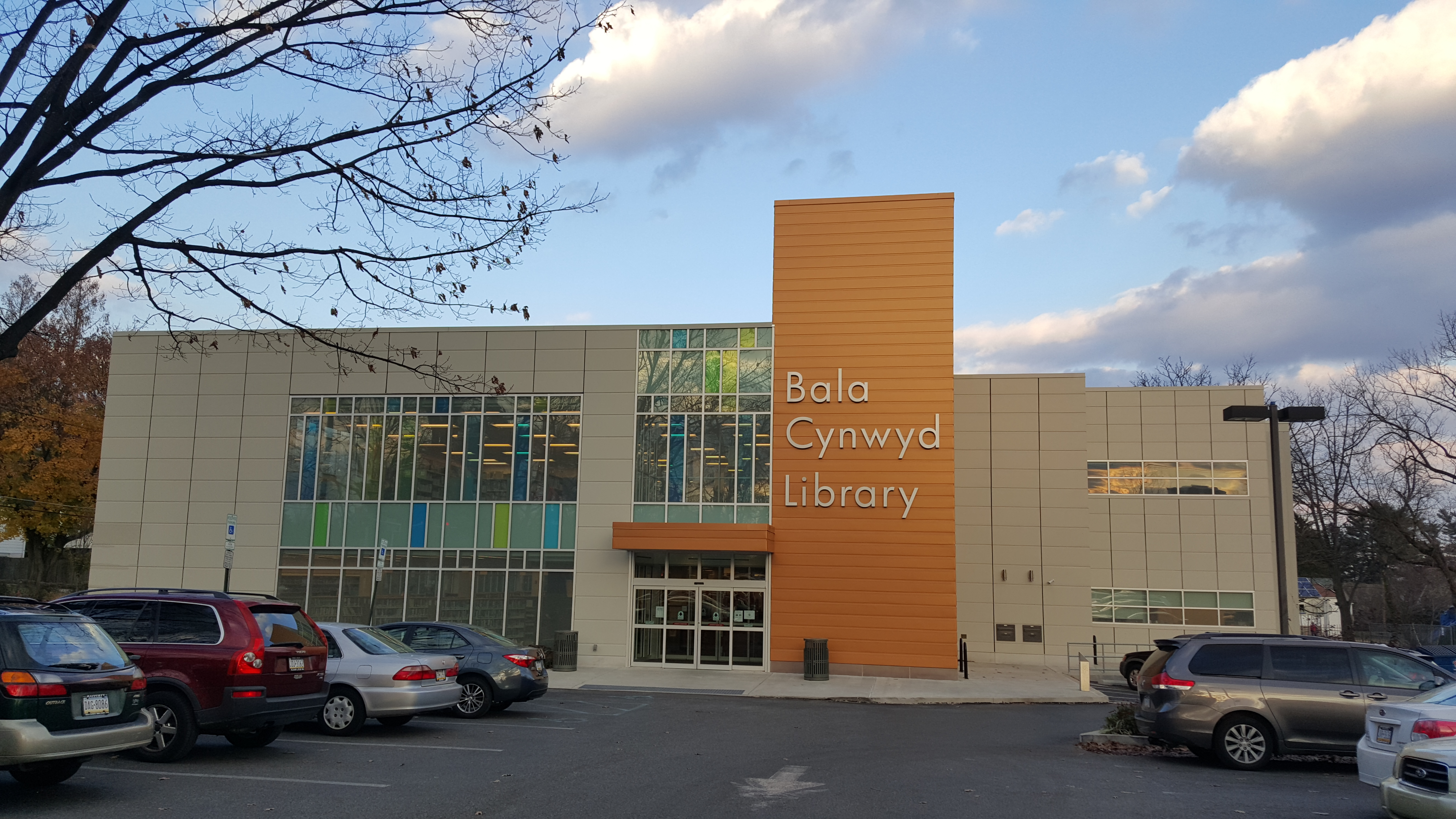
- Bala Cynwyd Library, part of the Lower Merion Library System

- Location of Bala Cynwyd Bala Cynwyd, Pennsylvania (the United States)
- Coordinates: 40°00′27″N 75°14′03″W
- Country: United States
- State: Pennsylvania
- County: Montgomery
- Township: Lower Merion
- Settled: 1682
- Elevation: 302 ft (92 m)

Population (2020)
  - Total: 9,285
- Time zone: UTC-5 (EST)
  - Summer (DST): UTC-4 (EDT)
- Zip Code: 19004
- Area codes: 484 and 610

Bala Cynwyd (/ˌbælə ˈkɪnwʊd/ BAL-ə KIN-wuud) (Note: Not *[ˈbala ˈkənwɨd] like its Welsh namesakes.) is a community and census-designated place in Lower Merion Township, Pennsylvania, United States. It is located on the Philadelphia Main Line in the Philadelphia metropolitan area, and borders the western edge of Philadelphia at U.S. Route 1 (City Avenue).

The present-day community was originally two separate towns, Bala and Cynwyd, but was united as a single community largely because the U.S. Post Office, the Bala Cynwyd branch, served both towns, later using ZIP Code 19004. The combining of the communities gives a total population of 9,285 as of the 2020 census. The community was long known as hyphenated Bala-Cynwyd. Bala and Cynwyd are currently served by separate stations on SEPTA's Cynwyd Line of Regional Rail.

Bala Cynwyd lies in the Welsh Tract of Pennsylvania and was settled in the 1680s by Welsh Quakers, who named it after the town of Bala and the village of Cynwyd in Wales. A mixed residential community made up predominantly of single-family detached homes, it extends west of the Philadelphia city limits represented by City Avenue from Old Lancaster Road at 54th Street west to Meeting House Lane and then along Manayunk and Conshohocken State Roads north to Mary Watersford Road, then east along Belmont Avenue back to City. This large residential district contains some of Lower Merion's oldest and finest stone mansions, built mainly from 1880 through the 1920s and located in the sycamore-lined district between Montgomery Avenue and Levering Mill Road, as well as split level tract houses built east of Manayunk Road just after World War II.

Historical population
| Census | Pop. | Note | %± |
|---|---|---|---|
| 2020 | 9,285 | | — |

== History ==
The oldest commercial district and the original center of Bala Cynwyd straddles the bridge over the old Pennsylvania Railroad tracks, originally belonging to the Columbia Railroad and now part of SEPTA's Cynwyd Line, along Montgomery Avenue at Bala Avenue. This district, long on the National Register of Historic Places, was settled shortly after William Penn's landing in Pennsylvania in 1682 and contains the village's oldest commercial buildings, some dating to the earliest years of the 19th century. Bala Avenue is an extension of this original town center and comprises a specialized commercial district of its own more than a century old; it has long been known for its children's clothing stores, women's dress and consignment shops, the Bala Theater and a number of small restaurants. The remainder of Bala Cynwyd's original commercial district extends south along Montgomery Avenue as part of the Bala Cynwyd-Merion Commercial District and is coextensive with the commercial center of Merion, with its popular delicatessens and restaurants.

The village is home to houses of worship of many religions. The oldest of these is Saint John's Episcopal Church on Levering Mill Road, founded in 1863. Saint Matthias Catholic Church is also found one block south of Montgomery on Bryn Mawr Avenue. Bala Cynwyd has also drawn a number of Modern Orthodox and Conservative Jews who live within walking distance of Lower Merion Synagogue and Congregation Adath Israel on Old Lancaster Road where Bala Cynwyd meets Merion. Churches of other denominations are located in nearby Narberth, Wynnewood, Merion, and Wynnefield/Overbrook.

=== 20th century ===
The Neighborhood Club of Bala Cynwyd, established in 1906, works to preserve the residential character of the neighborhood and promote civic welfare and community spirit. It sponsors an annual Independence Day celebration on July 4 which begins in front of the Union Fire Association on Montgomery Avenue and ends at the Bala Cynwyd Playground. The parade features neighborhood children riding decorated bicycles, marchers in costumes, clowns, floats, fire trucks, police, and public officials.

The Lower Merion Historical Society recently relocated its headquarters from Ashbridge House in Rosemont to the ancient Cynwyd Academy building, adjacent to Bala Cynwyd Middle School on Bryn Mawr Avenue in Cynwyd.

Among the claimants for First Boy Scout Troop in the United States is Troop 1 in Bala Cynwyd.

Bala Cynwyd has long been home to most of the broadcasting outlets in the Philadelphia region. In 1952, CBS television station WCAU-TV built its headquarters at the corner of City Avenue and Monument Road. Now an NBC owned-and-operated station, the station was located there until 2018, when the studios moved to the Comcast Technology Center in Center City Philadelphia, though some operations remain at the former studios. A decade later, ABC affiliate WFIL-TV moved to a new studio directly across the street from WCAU on City Avenue, just inside the Philadelphia city limits. The station, now ABC O&O WPVI-TV, is still based there today. Bala Cynwyd is also home to Beasley Broadcast Group's WBEN-FM, WMGK, WMMR and WPEN. iHeartMedia's WDAS-FM, WDAS-AM, WUSL, WRFF, WUMR, and WIOQ radio stations are located on Presidential Boulevard; independently owned WBEB is located on City Avenue. CBS's WGMP (now WPHT) left Bala Cynwyd to move to Philadelphia when NBC and CBS swapped stations in 1995, as did WTEL (formerly WIP) and WIP-FM (formerly WYSP).

As of 2016, after some moves in and out of Philadelphia, CBS stations WXTU, WOGL, and WTDY are located in Bala. Bala Cynwyd is also the corporate home of Entercom Communications Corporation, which is poised to be the second largest owner of radio stations in the United States, following its announcement of a merger with CBS Radio February 2, 2017.

Opened in 1957, Bala Cynwyd On City Avenue (formerly Bala Cynwyd Shopping Center) lies a half mile south of the village center, bordering Philadelphia on City Avenue. Its major outlets are Acme Markets, Olive Garden and LA Fitness; Saks Fifth Avenue is located a block to the east.

From 1946 to 1960, the National Football League had its headquarters located in Bala Cynwyd.

Bala Cynwyd Junior High School Complex and West Laurel Hill Cemetery are listed on the National Register of Historic Places.

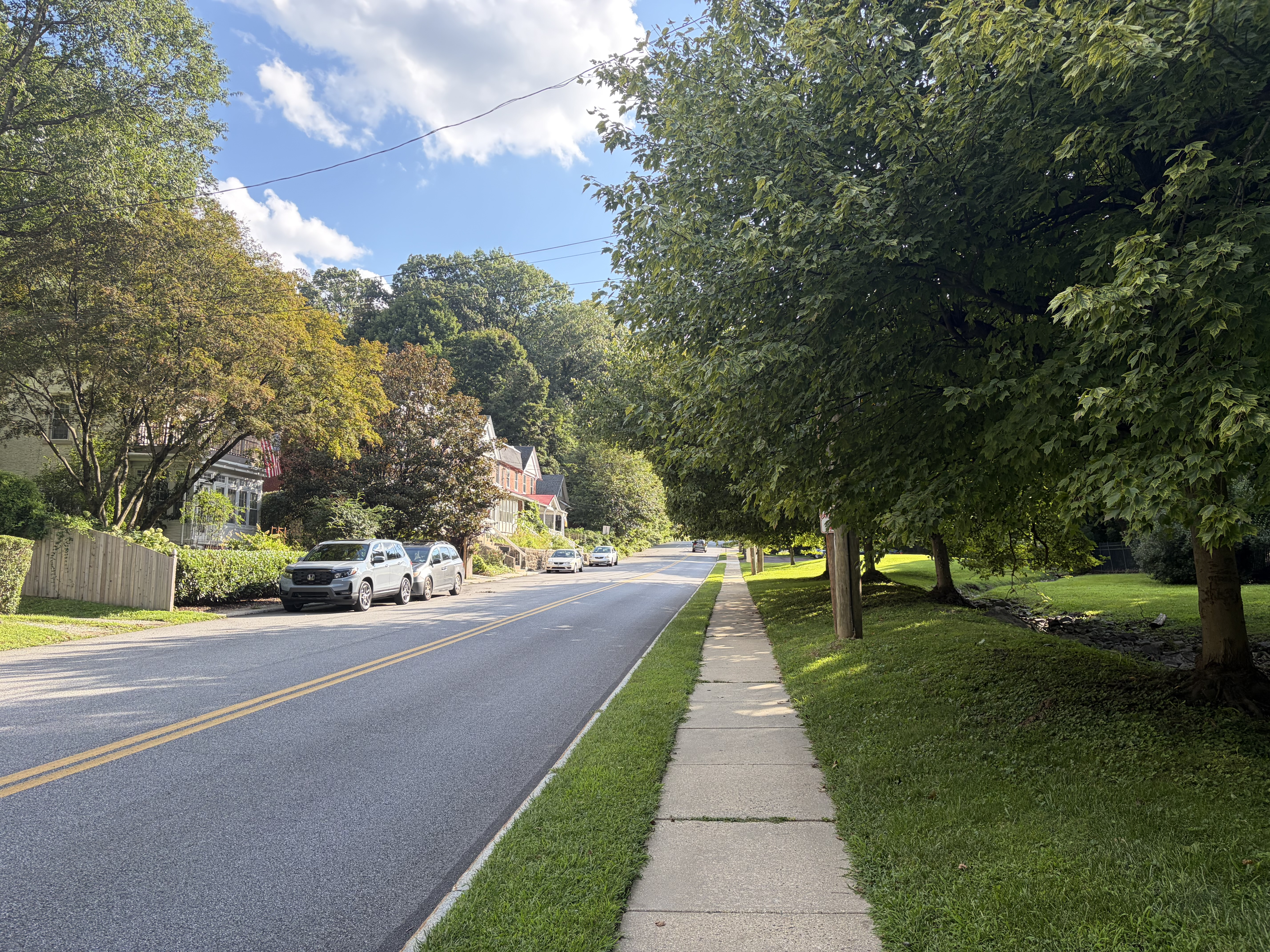
Righters Ferry Road in Bala Cynwyd, PA

== Schools ==
Bala Cynwyd is served by the Lower Merion School District, with its headquarters in Ardmore.

As of 2024, the vast majority of Bala Cynwyd is zoned to Cynwyd Elementary School on Levering Mill Road, while some sections to the southwest are zoned to Merion Elementary School, and some small sections to the north are zoned to Belmont Hills Elementary School on Madison Avenue. Almost all of the CDP is zoned to Bala Cynwyd Middle School on North Bryn Mawr Avenue, while small portions to the north are zoned to Welsh Valley Middle School. In almost all of the CDP, high school students living in Bala Cynwyd may choose between Lower Merion High School in Ardmore and Harriton High School in Rosemont, while small portions to the north are zoned only to Harriton High School.

Another school in Bala Cynwyd is Kohelet Yeshiva High School on Old Lancaster Road. Located on Montgomery Avenue at Bryn Mawr Avenue is Kosloff Torah Academy, an Orthodox Jewish, private all-girls high school serving the local and general Philadelphia region. Nearby on Levering Mill Road, Orthodox Jewish boys attend the Mesivta High School of Greater Philadelphia. The private, Catholic Merion Mercy and Waldron Mercy Academies are only a quarter mile up Montgomery Avenue in Merion. The bilingual French International School of Philadelphia, on North Highland Avenue, teaches approximately 320 children from pre-kindergarten (K3) to eighth grade in French and English.

== Library ==
The Bala Cynwyd Public Library, part of the six-branch Lower Merion Library System, occupies a modern facility on Old Lancaster Road. It is home to more than 221,000 items and features up-to-date computer facilities and a dedicated children's library on the second floor. The system as a whole, with its central library located at Bryn Mawr's Ludington Memorial Library on South Bryn Mawr Avenue, is home to more than 1.4 million items and stands in the 99th percentile nationwide for annual resident visits and volumes per resident capita.

== Notable people ==
- Jane Amsterdam, magazine and newspaper editor
- Hobey Baker, namesake of NCAA men's hockey award
- Tom Baker, Professor at the University of Pennsylvania Law School
- Vijay Balasubramanian, Professor of Physics at the University of Pennsylvania
- Chuck Barris, American game show creator, producer, and host; songwriter; author
- James A. Bland, 19th century minstrel and composer (Oh, Dem Golden Slippers, Carry Me Back to Old Virginny) is buried here at Merion Memorial Park
- Kobe Bryant, NBA Basketball player, attended Bala Cynwyd Middle School and Lower Merion High School
- Paul Cava, photographer
- Arthur Dantchik, billionaire co-founder of Susquehanna International Group
- Madeleine Dean, U.S. representative
- Robert Fagles, translator and Lower Merion High School graduate
- Stan Fine, magazine gag cartoonist
- Larry Friedman, basketball player
- Bob Garfield, co-host of On the Media on National Public Radio
- Alexander Haig, United States Army general and later United States Secretary of State
- Lewis M. Haupt (1844-1937), civil engineer
- Antonio Guiteras Holmes, Cuban politician in the 1930s, was born in Bala Cynwyd
- Skip James, blues musician, is buried here at Merion Memorial Park
- Bruce Marks (born 1957), American politician
- Mirah, singer-songwriter
- Julie Nathanson, voice actress
- Jane Norman, actress best known for her role as Pixanne in the children's television program of the same name
- Jack Rose, guitarist
- Robert Sataloff, surgeon, baritone, composer, and conductor
- Heather J. Sharkey, Professor in the Department of Middle Eastern Languages and Cultures at the University of Pennsylvania
- Ben Shibe, sporting goods and baseball executive

== Places of interest ==
- Merion Memorial Park is a historic cemetery where many prominent Black Philadelphians, among others, are buried. Its eight sections are named for notable figures in 19th-century abolitionism and civil rights: Banneker, Catto, Lincoln, Montgomery, Reynolds, Stevens, Sumner, and White.
- The Cynwyd Heritage Trail is a 2-mile (3.2 km) linear park and rail-to-trail that connects Lower Merion Township to Manayunk through the Manayunk Bridge over the Schuylkill River.
- West Laurel Hill Cemetery listed on the National Register of Historic Places

== In popular culture ==
- Bala Cynwyd was hometown to the fictional character Vida Boheme, a drag queen portrayed by Patrick Swayze in the 1995 film comedy, To Wong Foo, Thanks for Everything! Julie Newmar. In the film, Vida leaves the area after being disowned by their family. The pertinent scenes were filmed in Montclair, New Jersey.
- Bala Cynwyd was the location of a home invasion in the 2000 movie Unbreakable.
