= Schuylkill Branch =

Former railroad line in Pennsylvania

Map of the Pennsylvania Schuylkill Valley Railroad, the predecessor to the Schuylkill Branch

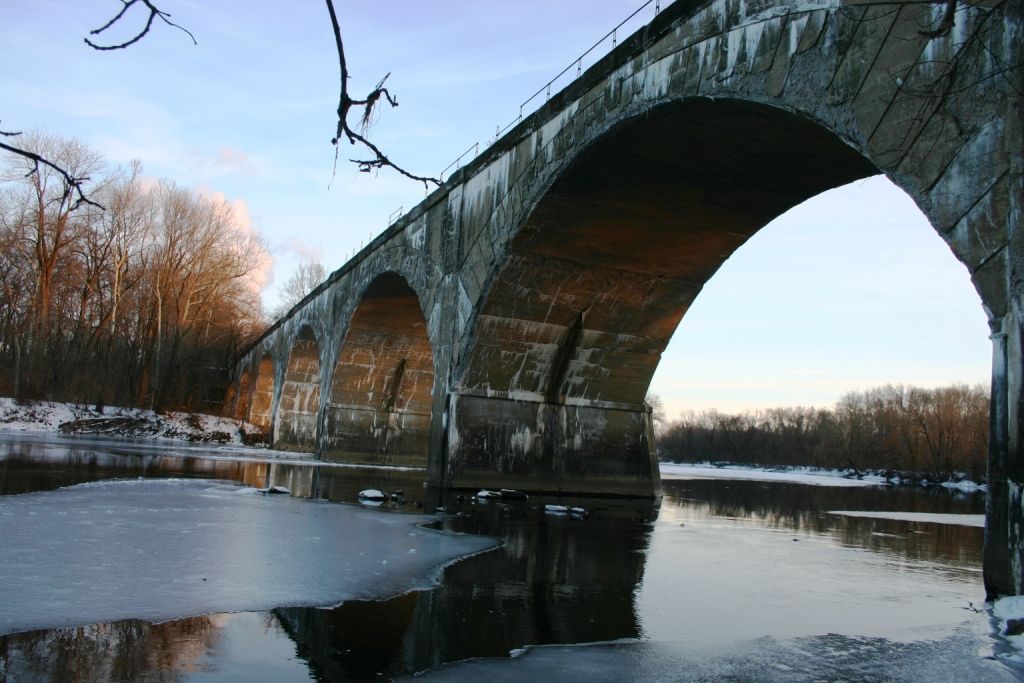
The abandoned Schuylkill Branch Bridge crossing the Schuylkill River in Pottsgrove, Pennsylvania, in 2011

The Schuylkill Branch was a rail line owned and operated by the former Pennsylvania Railroad (PRR) in Pennsylvania. The line ran from the Philadelphia to Harrisburg Main Line at 52nd Street in Philadelphia north via Norristown, Reading, and Pottsville to Delano Junction, about 2.5 mi (4.0 km) northeast of Delano. From Delano Junction, the PRR had trackage rights over the Lehigh Valley Railroad's Hazleton Branch and Tomhicken Branch to Tomhicken, where the PRR's Catawissa Branch began.

In conjunction with the Catawissa Branch, Nescopeck Branch, and Wilkes-Barre Branch, the Schuylkill Branch gave the PRR a direct line from Philadelphia to Wilkes-Barre.

== History ==
=== 19th century ===
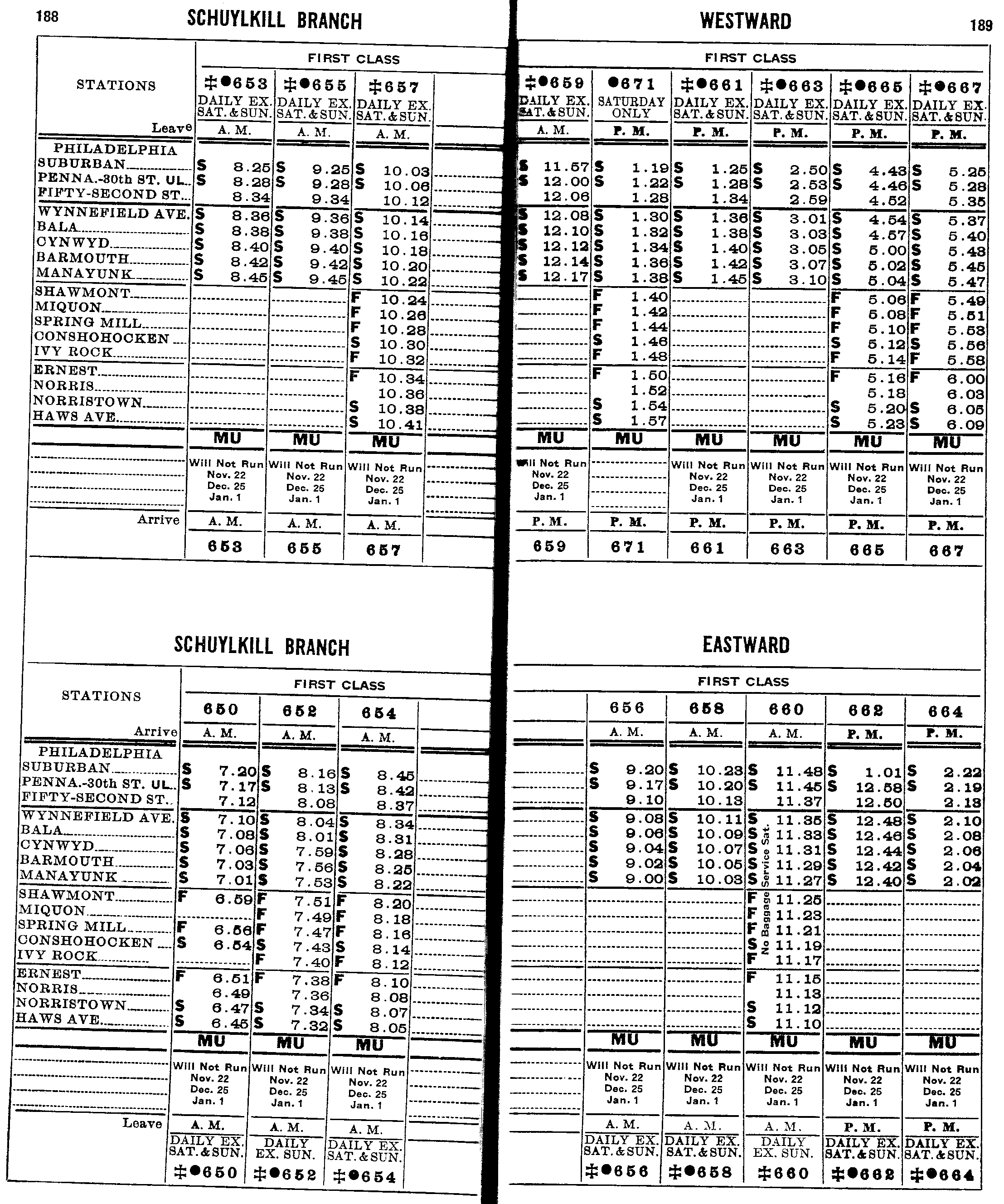
Pages 188-189 from The Pennsylvania Railroad (PRR) Employee Timetable Philadelphia Region No.2, showing the then-active service between Norristown and Philadelphia Suburban Station; service was truncated to Manayunk a few years later, and was further truncated under SEPTA to the Cynwyd Line.

The Schuylkill Branch originated as an attempt by the Pennsylvania Railroad to develop its anthracite coal holdings in the upper Susquehanna watershed.

Prior to 1874, when a change to Pennsylvania's constitution blocked further investment by transportation companies in mining properties, the PRR had invested more $5,000,000 in the anthracite business and owned an estimated 1 billion tons of recoverable anthracite, but it lacked an easy rail route from the anthracite fields to tidewater. Shipments to New York required cooperation of the Lehigh Valley Railroad, which had its own coal interests, while bringing anthracite to Philadelphia on the Pennsylvania's rails required it to travel a circuitous route via Sunbury and Harrisburg. A more direct route to Philadelphia was desirable. Furthermore, such a route would inevitably follow the Schuylkill River and parallel the Reading Company's main line. The Reading's successful efforts to break the PRR's monopoly on Philadelphia-New York service in the late 1870s was intensely provocative to PRR management, and retaliation against the Reading by breaking into its own territory on the Schuylkill played a role in the PRR's decision to build the branch.

The PRR initially chartered two subsidiaries to build its line up the Schuylkill: the Philadelphia, Norristown and Phoenixville Railroad and the Phoenixville, Pottstown and Reading Railroad were incorporated on September 20, 1882. The first had charter rights to run from some point on the PRR's main line to Pittsburgh between Girard Avenue, Philadelphia and Radnor to the Schuylkill valley, and then up the river to Phoenixville. Construction began in August 1882, before the company was organized, along a 23.8-mile (38.3 km) route from the main line near Monticello Street in Philadelphia to Phoenixville. The second company began work on the 30.3-mile (48.8 km) route along the Schuylkill from Phoenixville to Reading in November 1882. On June 1, 1883, these two companies were consolidated with the Phoenixville and West Chester Railroad, then building the PRR's Phoenixville Branch, into the Pennsylvania Schuylkill Valley Railroad. It was immediately leased to the PRR for fifty years.

The new company completed the Phoenixville Branch on August 1, 1883. The first segment of the Schuylkill Branch, 1.5 miles (2.4 km) from the junction with the main line to Bala, opened on April 1, 1884. The rest of the line to Reading was completed during the same year, adding 2.5 miles (4.0 km) to Manayunk on May 12, 9.6 miles (15.4 km) to Norristown on June 23, 22.7 miles (36.5 km) through Phoenixville to Pottstown on September 22, and a final 18.1 miles (29.1 km) to Reading on November 24.

Opened in 1884 to compete with the Reading Railroad for Philadelphia–Reading service, when the latter decided to compete with the PRR for Philadelphia to New York City service, the Schuylkill Branch service primarily as a commuter rail line between Philadelphia and Norristown, with the lines being within plain sight of each other between Manayunk and Norristown. Service to Pottstown was made available in 1886, and an extension to New Boston, near Mahanoy City, was opened by the Pottsville and Mahanoy Railroad around the same time. The final piece, from New Boston to Delano Junction, had been built by the Lehigh Valley Railroad before 1870, but this was leased by the PRR in 1885.

=== 20th century ===
In the 1930s, as part of the extensive electrification project that brought New York–Washington and Harrisburg–Philadelphia intercity passenger and through-freight service under wire, the Schuylkill Branch was electrified from its 52nd Street Junction in Philadelphia to Haws Avenue in Norristown.

With the surge in automobile sales and construction of extensions of the Pennsylvania Turnpike and the Interstate Highway System in Pennsylvania in the 1950s, the PRR eliminated commuter rail service in 1960 north of Manayunk, yielding Philadelphia, Norristown, and Reading commuter and through-passenger service to the rival Reading.

With the bankruptcies of the PRR's successor Penn Central and the Reading Company, the creation of Conrail in 1976 led to the closure and abandonment of the Schuylkill Valley Branch north of Manayunk. SEPTA, which took over the rail line in 1983, operated the former Conrail service as its Cynwyd Line rail service until 1986, when spalling conditions on the Manayunk Bridge concrete viaduct connecting the line between Bala Cynwyd and Manayunk/Ivy Ridge warranted its closure, forcing SEPTA to scale back service its Cynwyd Station in Bala Cynwyd. The viaduct has since been repaired and restored to its previous glory, though service has not resumed. SEPTA leased the unused section between Cynwyd and Ivy Ridge to local townships for used as an interim rail trail.

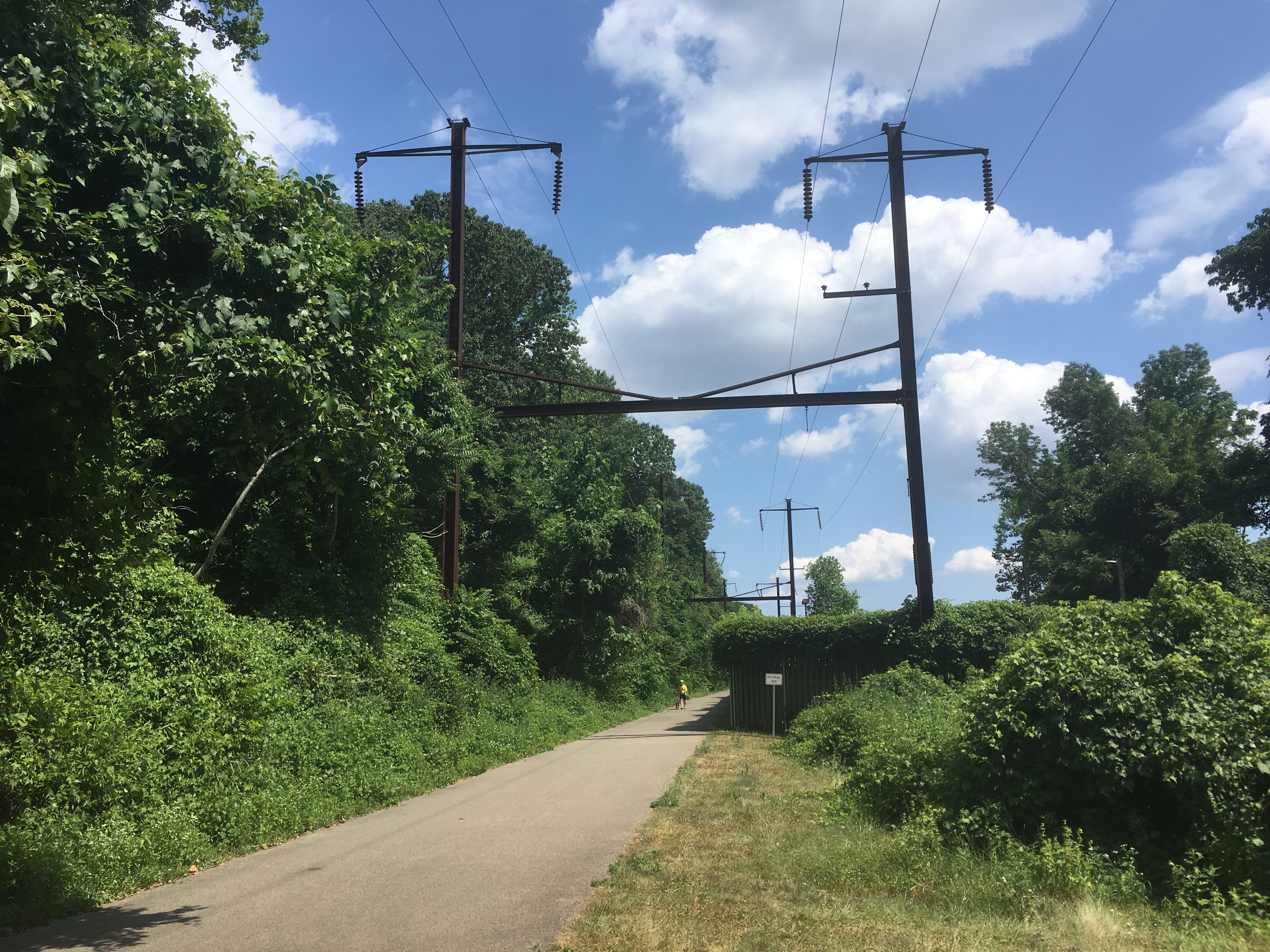
Former section of the Schuylkill Branch in the Roxborough section of Philadelphia that is part of the Schuylkill River Trail; the PRR-era catenary poles remain.

While mostly abandoned, and since converted to a rail trail connecting Philadelphia with the Valley Forge National Historical Park near King of Prussia, Pennsylvania, a short piece in Norristown is used by Norfolk Southern Railway (NS), which took over much of the PRR system when it split Conrail's interests with CSX, as part of their Morrisville Connecting Track. The line between Oaks and Phoenixville is part of the currently dormant NS Phoenixville Industrial Track. The Reading Blue Mountain and Northern Railroad owns the line from Temple (north of Reading) north to Hamburg.

The line remains intact from Gibraltar, Pennsylvania at Gibraltar Road/PA Route 724 to Birdsboro, Pennsylvania. The PRR-era catenary remains and currently maintained by Amtrak as part of their 25 Hz traction power system, as it powers both the Northeast and Keystone Corridors, except for the ex-PRR/Penn Central lines electrified prior to 1925, generated by the Safe Harbor Dam located near York, Pennsylvania.

The proposed Schuylkill Valley Metro, an electrified rail service that would have restored passenger service connecting Philadelphia and Reading, would have used the ex-PRR/Penn Central tracks from 52nd Street to Ivy Ridge, connecting with the existing ex-Reading Manayunk/Norristown service to Reading.

Because of its rejection by the Federal Railroad Administration due to the high cost, primarily for electrification of the entire line and the need to rebuild the entire Philadelphia-Manayunk section of the Schuylkill Branch, alternate plans including using the ex-Reading Manayunk/Norristown route only, with partial extension of the electrified service as far as King of Prussia, and any service west of King of Prussia requiring the use of push-pull consists using dual-power ALP-45DP locomotives similar to those delivered to New Jersey Transit and Montreal's Exo.
