= Manayunk, Philadelphia =

Manayunk
- Neighborhood of Philadelphia
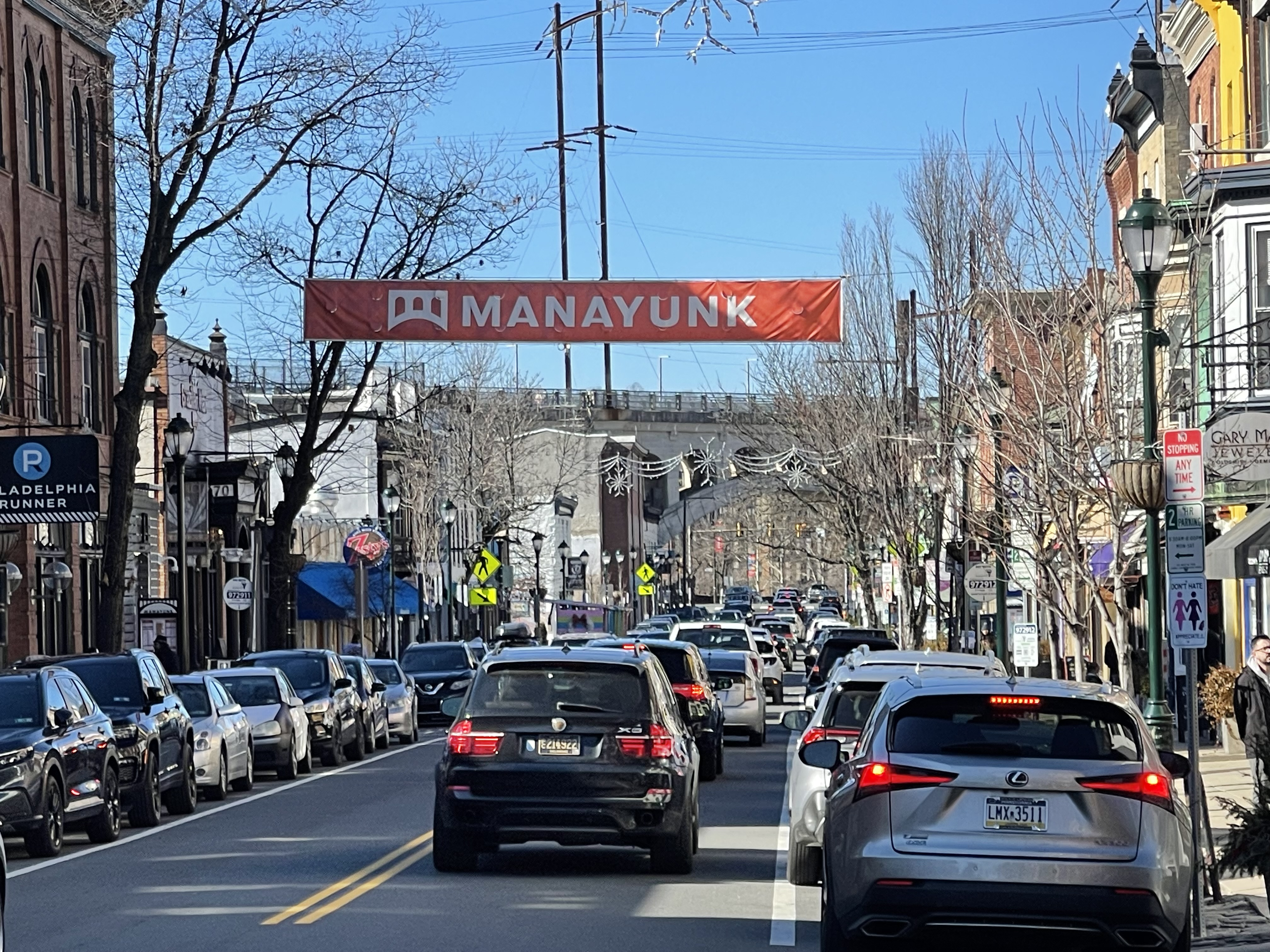
- Manayunk Main Street with the Manayunk Bridge in the background
- Nicknames: MNYK, The Yunk
- Motto(s): Urban Experience, Small Town Charm
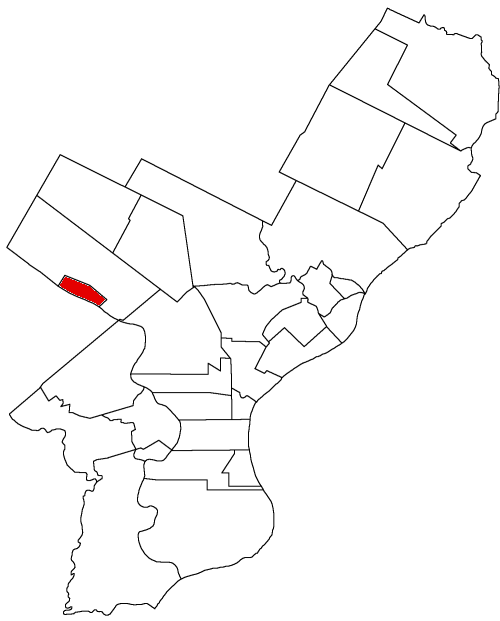
- Map of Philadelphia County, Pennsylvania highlighting Manayunk Borough prior to the Act of Consolidation, 1854
- Coordinates: 40°01′35″N 75°13′25″W
- Country: United States
- State: Pennsylvania
- County: Philadelphia

Population (2010)
  - Total: 10,154
- Time zone: UTC-5 (EST)
  - Summer (DST): UTC-4 (EDT)
- ZIP Code: 19127
- Area codes: 215, 267 and 445

Manayunk (/ˈmænəjʌŋk/ MAN-ə-yunk) is a neighborhood in the section of Lower Northwest Philadelphia in the state of Pennsylvania. Located adjacent to the neighborhoods of Roxborough and Wissahickon and also on the banks of the Schuylkill River, Manayunk contains the first canal begun in the United States (although not the first completed, due to budget problems).

The area's name is derived from the language of the Lenape Native American tribe. In 1686, in documents between William Penn and the Lenape, the Lenape referred to the Schuylkill River as "Manaiung", their word for "river", which literally translates as "place to drink"; the word was later altered and adopted as the town's name.

Although historically a working class community, in recent years the neighborhood has been substantially gentrified.

== History ==
=== Pre-industrial ===
Manayunk Borough was originally a community in Roxborough Township, Philadelphia County, situated near the Schuylkill River, south of the Wissahickon Creek. The land that would become Manayunk was first bought from William Penn in 1685-1686 and then transferred to the family of Wigard Levering. A large part of that land was then sold to Levering's son, Jacob, in 1716. Soon, the younger Levering built the first house in Manayunk, on the north side of Green Lane, west of Silverwood Street. The growing town was known as Flat Rock in 1810, from a peculiar flat rock lying on the lower side of the bridge. This was subsequently called Flat Rock Bridge. The bridge was part of the Flat Rock Turnpike connecting Roxborough Township with Merion Township. The bridge was demolished in 1850.

The settlement got its nineteenth-century identity from the construction of the dam, canal, and locks by the Schuylkill Navigation Company. The Manayunk section was finished at the end of 1818. Since the power provided by the water was extensive, the Navigation Company sought lessees of the power for use in mills and factories. In 1819, Capt. John Towers opened the first mill that used the canal's water power. After that, purchases of water-power and the erection of mills and factories greatly increased. The area became important as a manufacturing village. It had a very large textile industry, which was built in the 1830s by Joseph Ripka.

Inhabitants became dissatisfied with the name "Flat Rock" and held meetings on the topic of changing the name. On one such occasion in 1824, Greek revivalists wanted to call it Udoravia ("place by the water"), but this was later overturned in favor of the Lenape word for river mëneyung or manaiung ("where we go to drink"). For ease of spelling the "i" was changed to a "y" and the "g" to a "k".

The first Manayunk census was taken by the Rev. C. Vancleaf, pastor of the German Reformed Church, in March 1827. His count indicated 147 families; 550 males, 548 females; of which 244 were men, 306 women, 282 boys, and 266 girls, for a total of 1,098 inhabitants.

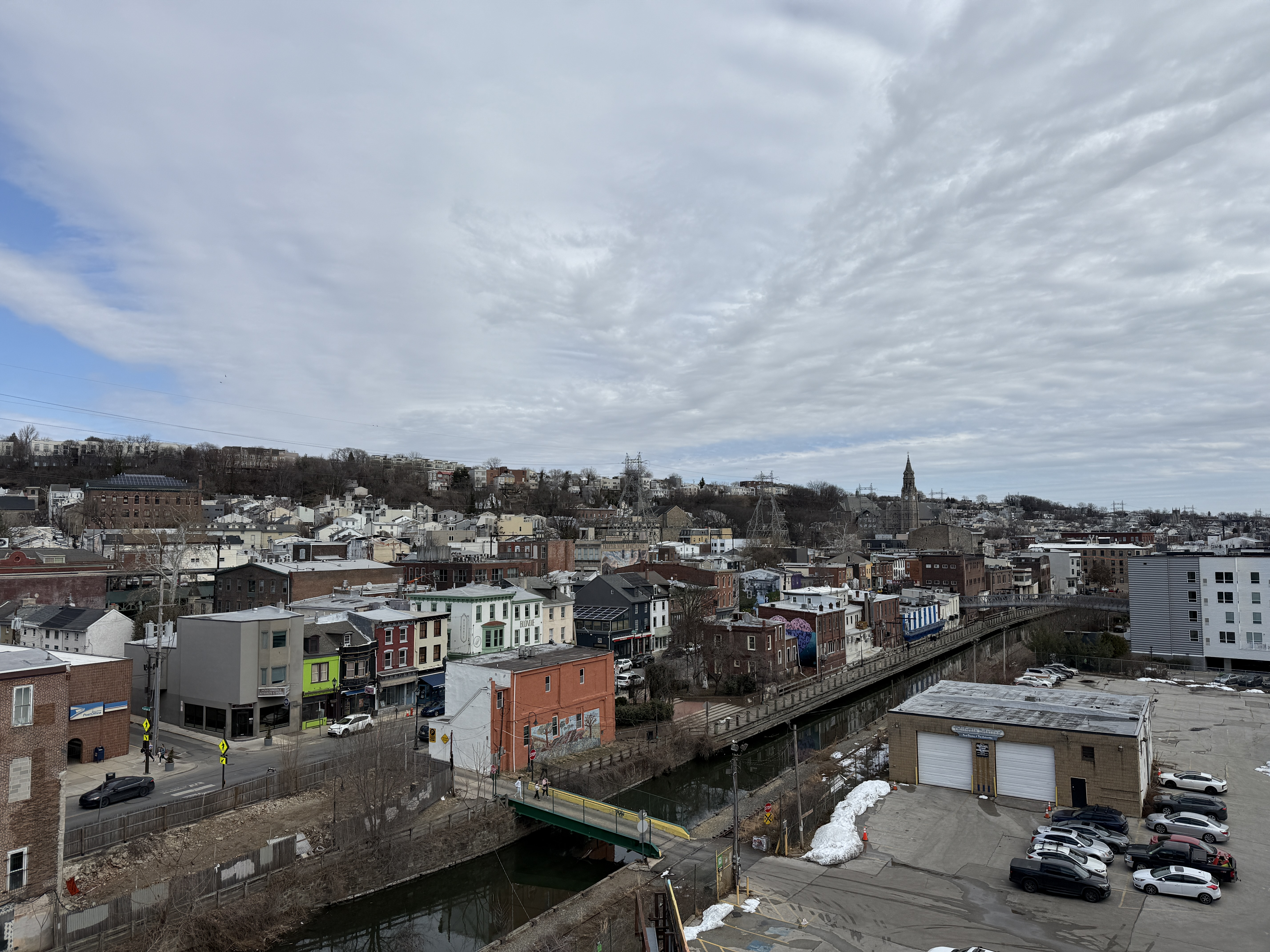
Manayunk viewed from the Manayunk Bridge

On June 11, 1840, Manayunk was incorporated as a borough. It was no longer considered part of the "Township or Borough of Rocks" (Roxborough). The borough lasted only 13 years. Manayunk and the rest of the boroughs, townships, and districts composing Philadelphia County were disbanded and merged into the City of Philadelphia, through the Act of Consolidation, 1854. Although Manayunk was no longer a separate entity, the community maintained its identity as a self-contained neighborhood. The area continued to be one of the manufacturing centers of the Philadelphia area for the next century but during the 1980s, Manayunk suffered from the decline of manufacturing jobs. It had many empty storefronts along Main Street, its primary commercial district. In the 1990s, Manayunk's revitalization began with the opening of several upscale restaurants on Main Street, which were backed by developers who promoted the neighborhood as a place to visit.

Manayunk retained its small-town charm with its small two- and three-story row homes, cobblestone paving, and hilly streets. Many who visited decided to stay and renovate the small row homes characteristic of the area. Increasing demand for housing in the area has led to the conversion of former mills into loft apartments, and replacement of empty storefronts and mom-and-pop stores with upscale shops. In 2004, a new condominium tower was built on part of Venice Island. In 2005, there were plans to build more condominium towers to replace the closed soap and paper factories. It became a popular place of residence for local college students and young professionals. Main Street is best known for its bars and restaurants. Main Street continues on to Umbria Street when heading north. Umbria Street was once known as Washington Street. The name was changed to reflect a large influx of Italian immigrants at the beginning of the 20th century.

The Manayunk Main Street Historic District and James Dobson School are listed on the National Register of Historic Places. The historic district has 91 contributing buildings, two contributing sites, and 12 contributing structures. The district was added to the National Register of Historic Places in 1982.

=== Honored by the U.S. Navy ===
Two U.S. Navy ships were named USS Manayunk.

The first was the monitor USS Manayunk (1864) which was constructed in Pittsburgh, Pennsylvania, for use in the American Civil War, but was commissioned too late to serve in that action. She was later pulled out of reserve and renamed USS Ajax (1864) by the prominent Philadelphian Secretary of the Navy Adolph E. Borie and saw action in the Spanish–American War.

The second ship to be named Manayunk was the World War II net laying ship USS Manayunk (AN-81), built in Portland, Oregon, which, like the first USS Manayunk, was built late in the war, but did operate in the Pacific Ocean in the Mariana Islands, primarily in the Saipan-Tinian area, laying and maintaining nets and moorings until the spring of 1946.

== Demographics ==
As of the 2010 census, Manayunk had 5,913 residents, 2,767 households, and 769 families.

The racial makeup of Manayunk was 92.6% White/Caucasian, 3.5% Black or African-American, 1.7% Asian, 1.7% two or more races, .4% some other race, and .1% were American Indian/Alaska Native. Hispanic or Latino people of any race were 2.4% of the population.

There were 2,767 households, of which 8.7% had children under the age of 18 living with them and 72.2% were non-families.

Of all households, 35.4% were made up of individuals living alone, and 4.8% had someone living alone who was 65 years of age or older. The average household size was 2.13 and the average family size was 2.76.

The median age in Manayunk was 27 years. There were 6.1% of residents under the age of 18; 28.5% were between the ages of 18 and 24; 45.3% were from 25 to 44; 13.6% were from 45 to 64; and, 6.5% were 65 years of age or older. The gender makeup of Manayunk was 51.5% male and 48.4% female.

There were 3,053 housing units in Manayunk. Of the total housing units, 2,767 were occupied: 41.3% were owner occupied, and 58.7% were renter occupied.

As of the Census Bureau's 2016 American Community Survey (ACS), the median household income for Manayunk was $70,568 and the median earnings for workers was $36,374. Of all residents in Manayunk, 20.9% had income in the past 12 months that was below the poverty level.

== Culture and community ==
Manayunk was populated by a mix of German, Irish and Polish immigrants, who established and maintained their own Catholic churches, including: St. John the Baptist (Irish), St. Lucy's (Italian), St. Mary's (German) and St. Josaphat's (Polish), giving rise to Manayunk's "church steeples in a hill town village" character. There are also several historic Protestant churches in the neighborhood. The Episcopal Church of St. David was founded on December 3, 1831. By 1924, the African American population in Manayunk had grown and the Heard AME church was founded to serve those residents.

Manayunk is central to Philadelphia's arts scene, and since 1989, the neighborhood has hosted the annual Manayunk Arts Festival, the tri-state's largest outdoor, juried arts festival. Taking Place in late June on Main Street, the festival attracts around 200,000 collectors, buyers, and designers. The Manayunk-Roxborough Art Center (MRAC) provides "a meeting place for the artistic community and to connect those engaged in creative endeavors with one another and the general public."

== Education ==
=== Primary and secondary schools ===
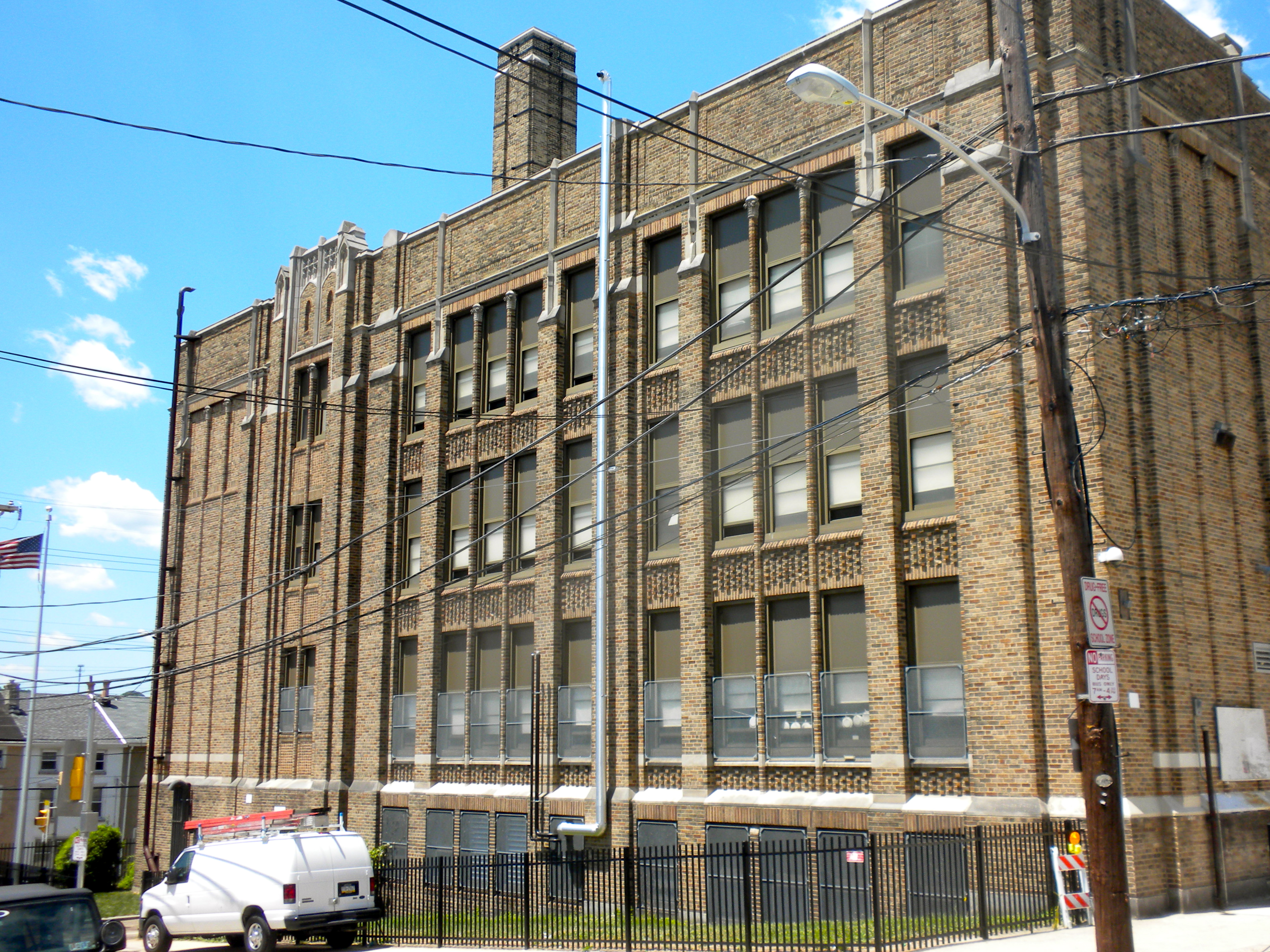
James Dobson School, which serves grades K through 8th grade, in Manayunk

Manayunk is served by the School District of Philadelphia. Local public schools serving Manayunk include Cook-Wissahickon School (K–8), Dobson Elementary School (K–8), and Roxborough High School. Green Woods Charter School (K–8) is a Manayunk area charter school.

=== Public libraries ===
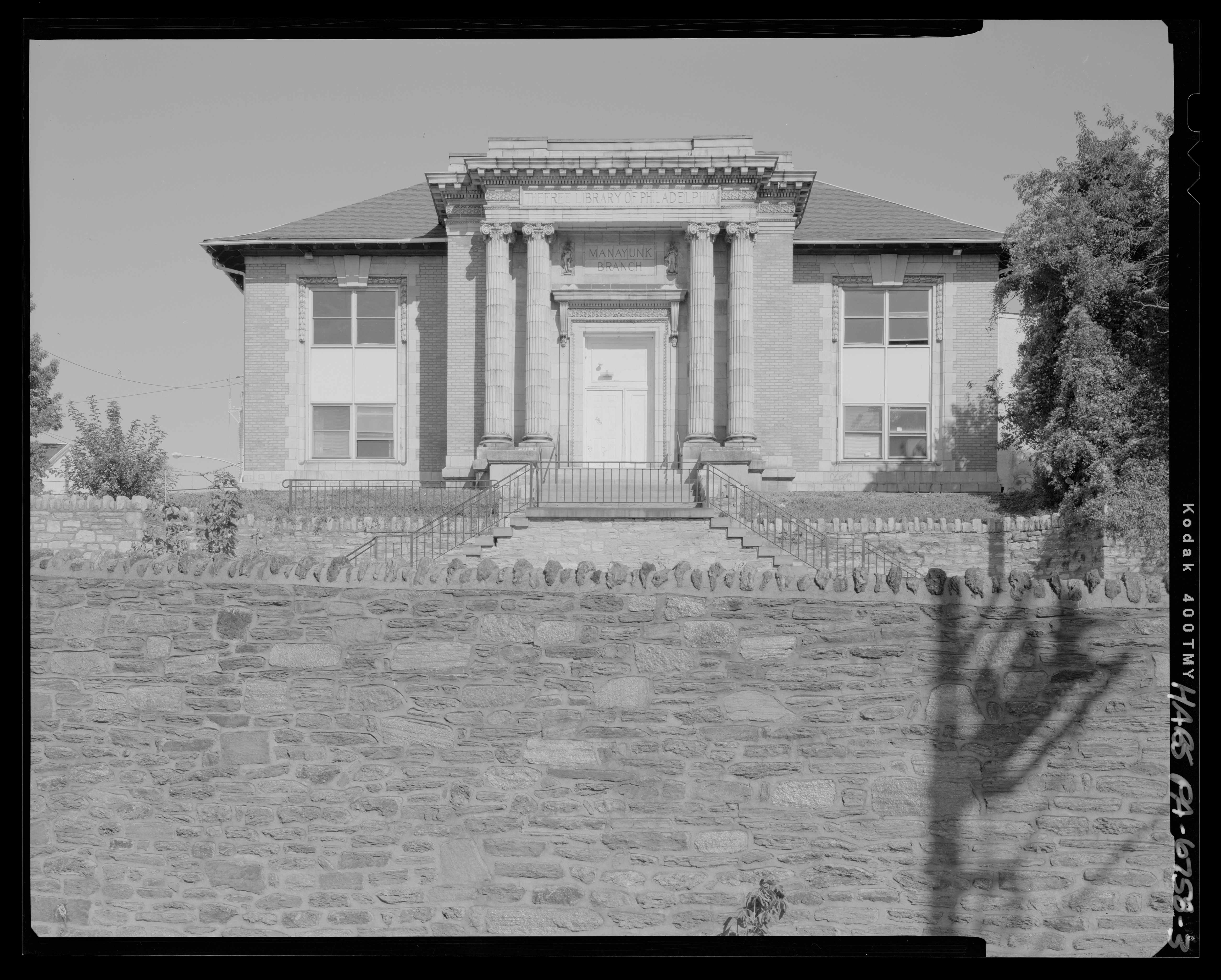
Manayunk Branch Library at Fleming and Dupont Streets

Free Library of Philadelphia operates the Roxborough Branch, serving Manayunk, at 6245 Ridge Avenue at Hermitage Street. A prior library, the Manayunk Branch, located at the corner of Fleming and Dupont Streets, opened in February 1909 and was built on land donated by John F. S. Morris, Esq. Designed in the Beaux-Arts style by the architect Benjamin Rush Stevens, it was the tenth Andrew Carnegie-funded Free Library branch and featured a main reading room, a children's room which also served as a lecture room seating 150, and a basement, which had two toilets, a staff room, kitchen, janitor's room, boiler room, and coal bins. The Manayunk Branch served the Manayunk neighborhood until it closed in 1969. The building was later used as a nursing home and is currently part of a condominium development.

== Transportation ==
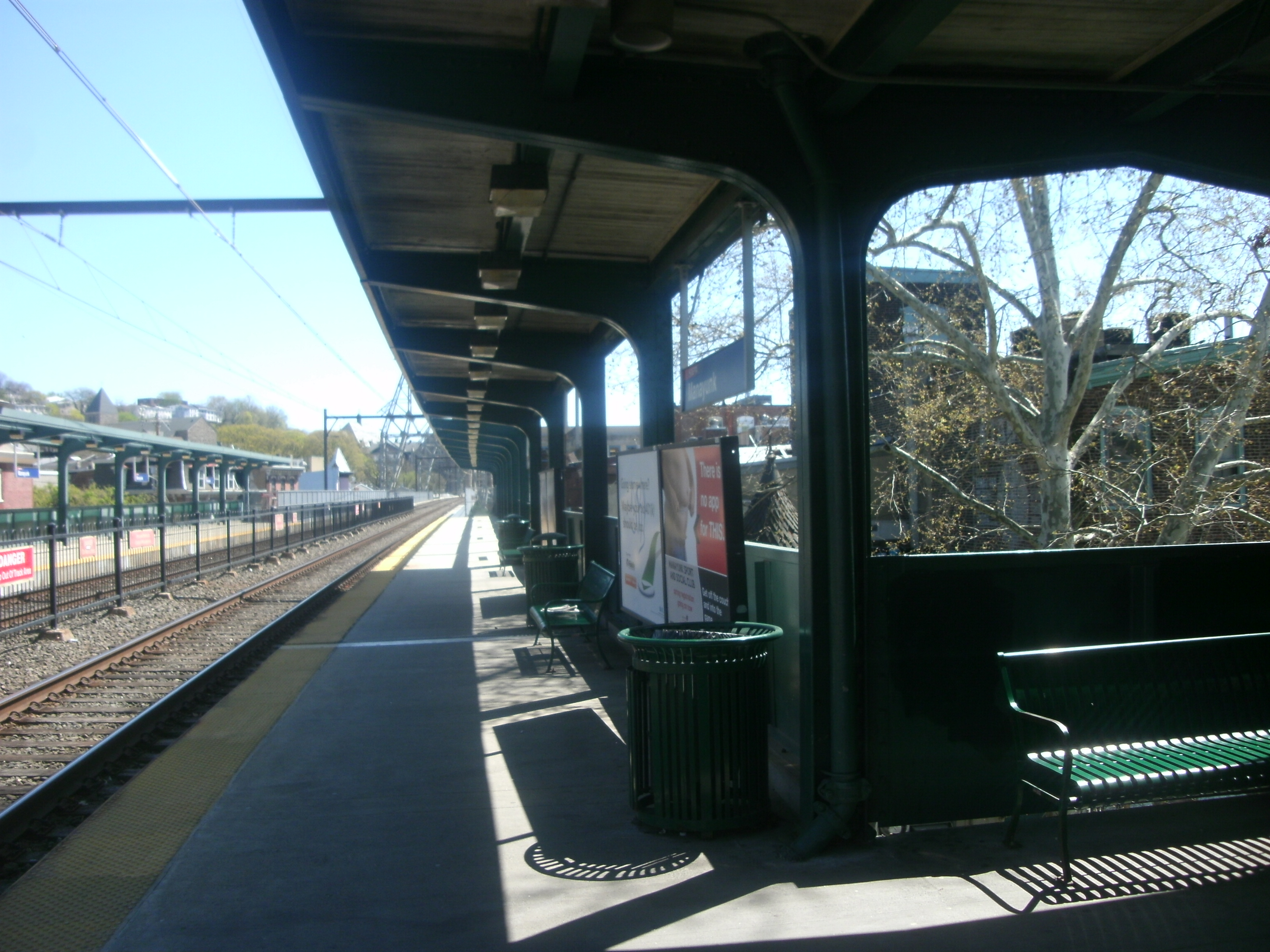
Manayunk station on SEPTAs Manayunk/Norristown Line in 2012

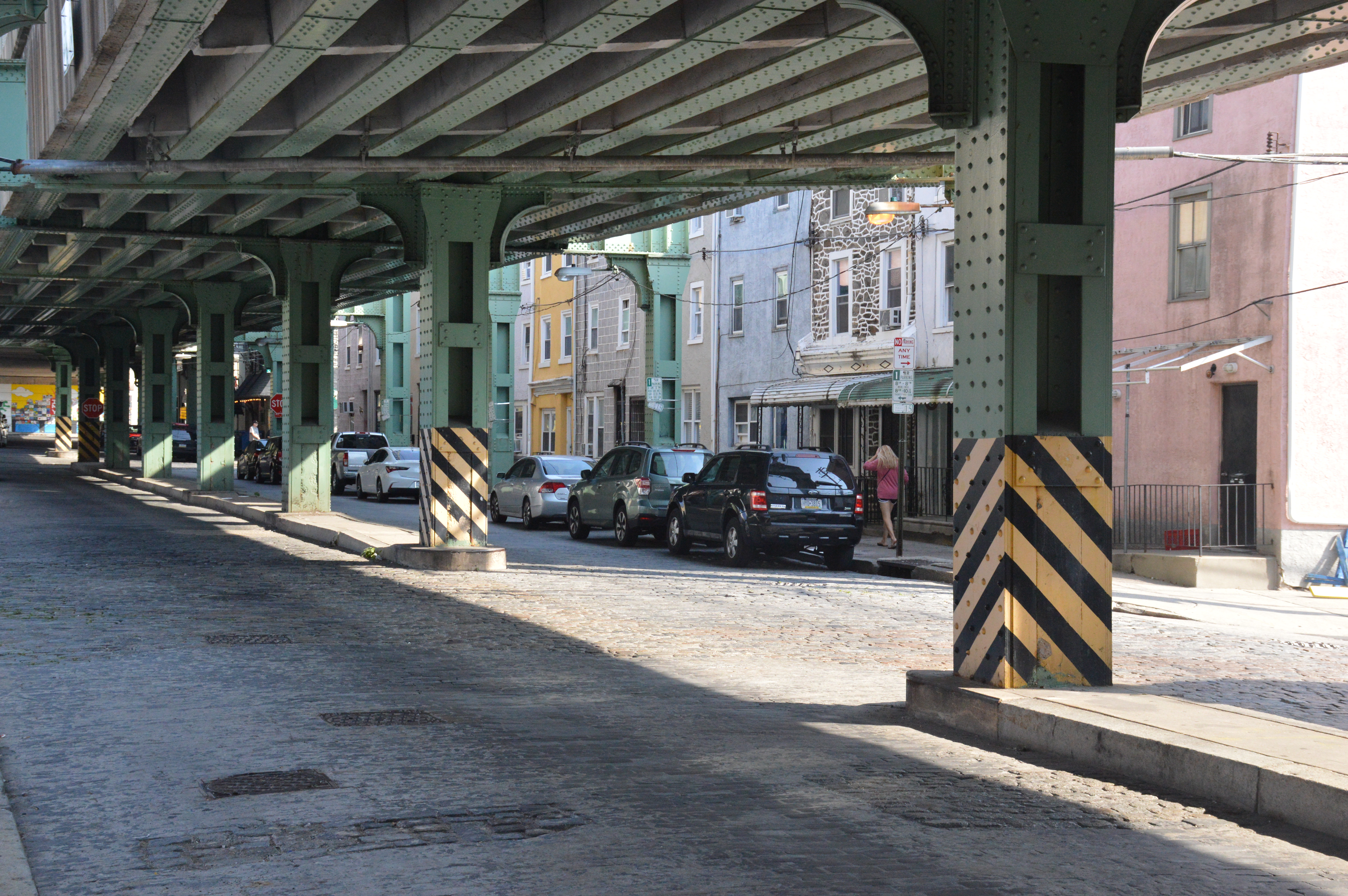
Cresson Street and elevated rail line, which services SEPTA's Manayunk/Norristown trains in 2019

The SEPTA Manayunk/Norristown Line, formerly part of the Reading Railroad rail line, runs through Manayunk, partly along an elevated structure above Cresson Street. The Manayunk train station is located on this elevated section. The Cynwyd Line used to have a stop in Manayunk before the line was cut back to its current terminus in Bala Cynwyd. This line used the landmark Manayunk Bridge, a concrete railroad viaduct built by the Pennsylvania Railroad which spans the Schuylkill River. Manayunk Bridge is an icon of Manayunk.

The neighborhood is also served by bus routes 9, 27, 35, and 61.

== Civic associations ==
The local civic association is the Manayunk Neighborhood Council. Public meetings are held on the first Wednesday of every month at one of three locations.

The Manayunk Special Services District of Philadelphia is a municipal authority providing business improvement district services in the Manayunk neighborhood of Northwest Philadelphia.

== Notable residents ==
- Nikki Jean ( (born 1983), singer-songwriter
- Mo Lisby (born Maurice Charles Lisby; 1912–1995), Negro league pitcher
- Peter McAdams (1834–1926), Irish American soldier
- Speedy Morris (born 1942), basketball coach
- Robert Prosky (born Robert Joseph Porzuczek; 1930–2008), actor
- Phenomenal Smith (born Francis Gammon; 1864–1952), professional baseball player and player-manager

== See also ==
- Manayunk Development Corporation
- Philadelphia International Cycling Championship
- Philadelphia Canoe Club
