= Cynwyd Heritage Trail =

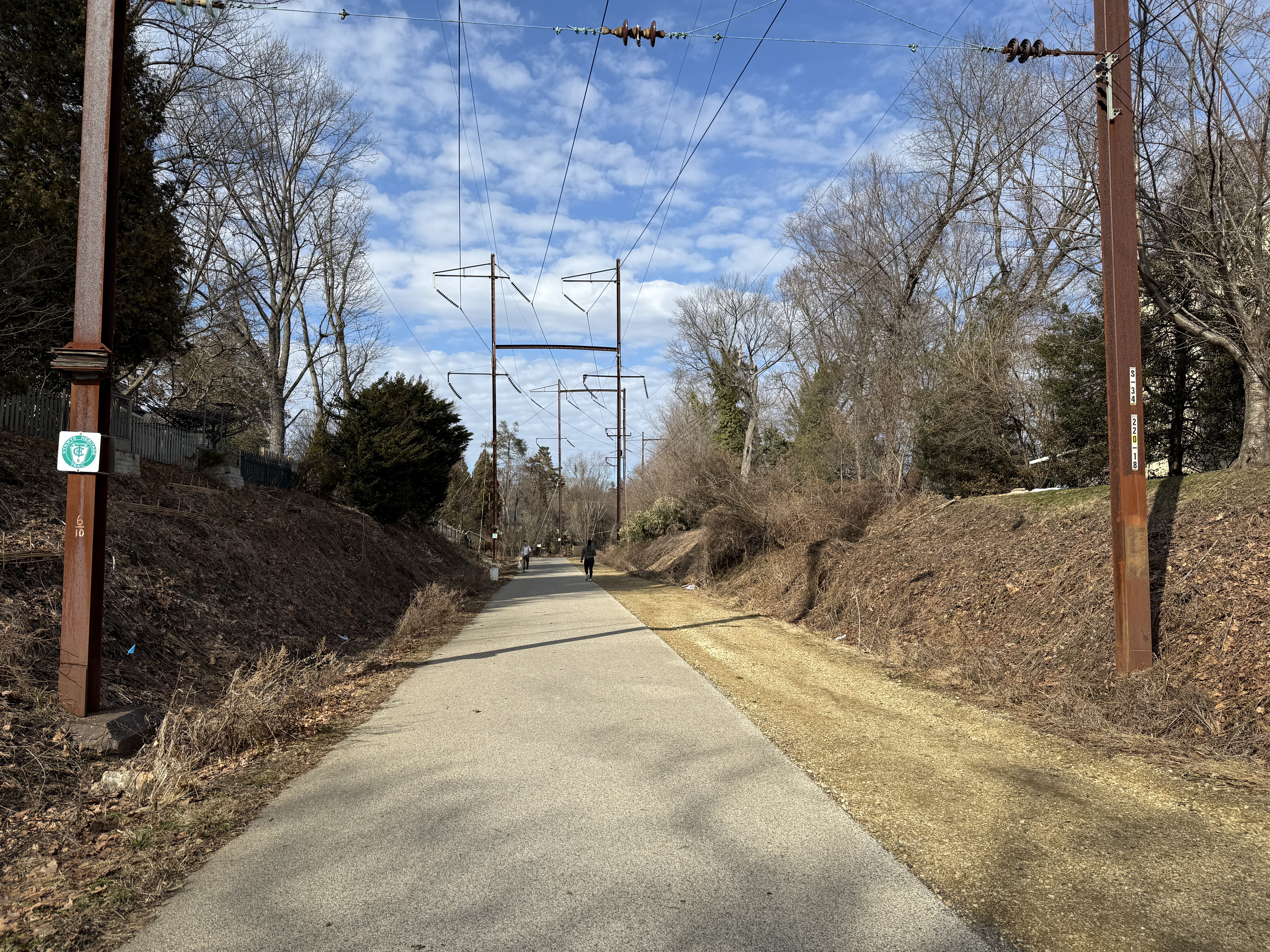
- The Cynwyd Heritage Trail follows the former Cynwyd Line railroad tracks
- Length: 1.8 mi (2.9 km)
- Trailheads: Lower Merion, Pennsylvania
- Use: Multi-use, non-motorized
- Season: Variable

The Cynwyd Heritage Trail is a 1.8-mile (2.9 km) rail trail in Lower Merion, Pennsylvania, on Philadelphia's Main Line. The trail surface is partially asphalt and crushed stone.

It follows the former SEPTA Cynwyd Line railway line from Cynwyd station to Belmont Avenue, with a branch to Philadelphia's Manyunk neighborhood via the Manayunk Bridge over the Schuylkill River. The bridge, also a rail-to-trail conversion, reopened in October 2015 after a renovation. The first pedestrian/cyclist-only bridge over the river, it connects to Schuylkill River Trail on the Philadelphia side.

Volunteers had for years maintained a trail along the former railroad right-of-way. In 2008, the Friends of the Cynwyd Heritage Trail organized as a volunteer group that recruits and organizes volunteer maintainers and raises funds to sustain and improve the park with permanent improvements and new amenities.

Construction on the Cynwyd Heritage Trail began in March 2011. A formal groundbreaking ceremony was held on May 5, 2011, and the trail was officially opened that summer.

== Gallery ==
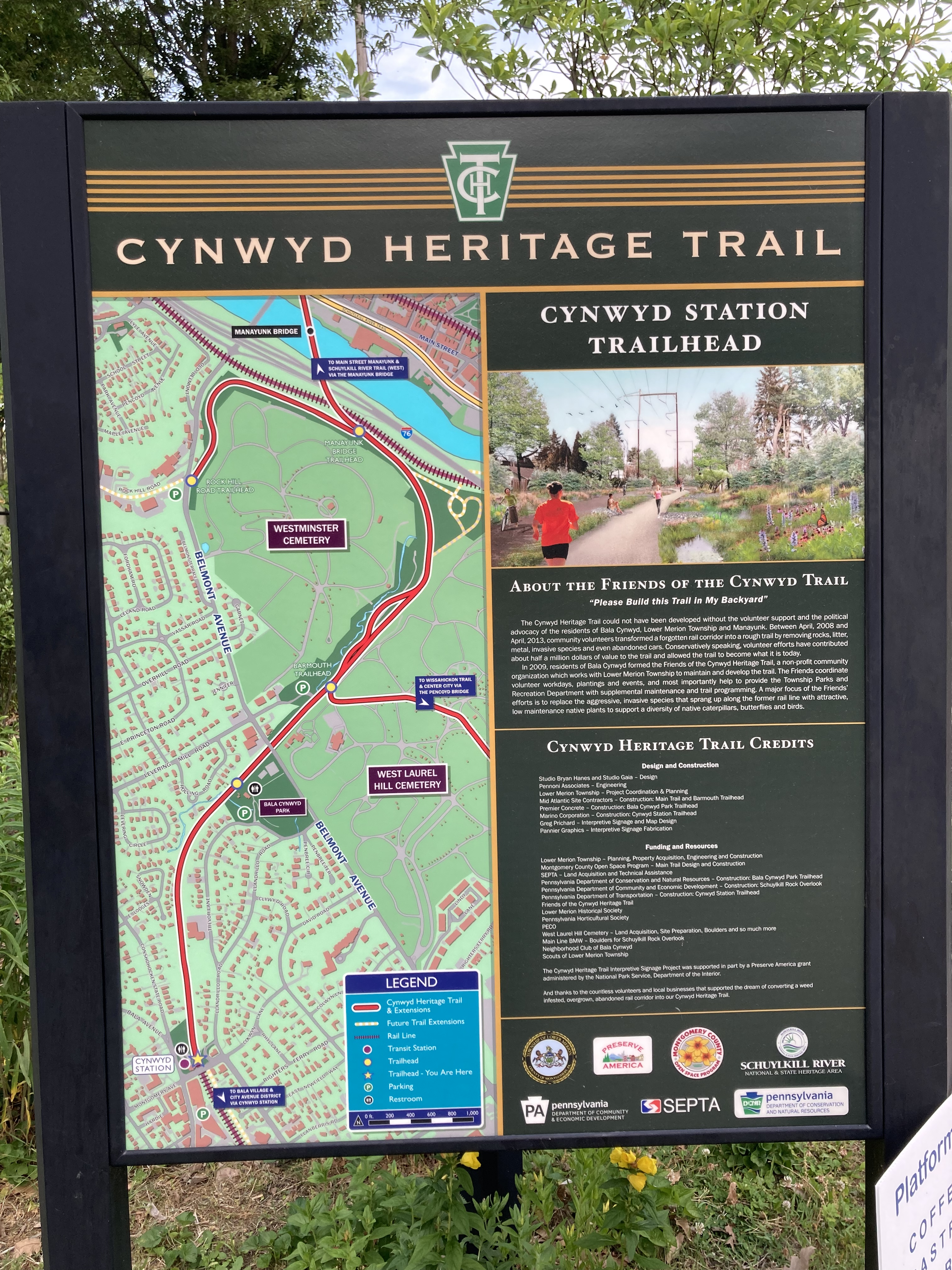
Cynwyd Heritage Trail sign.

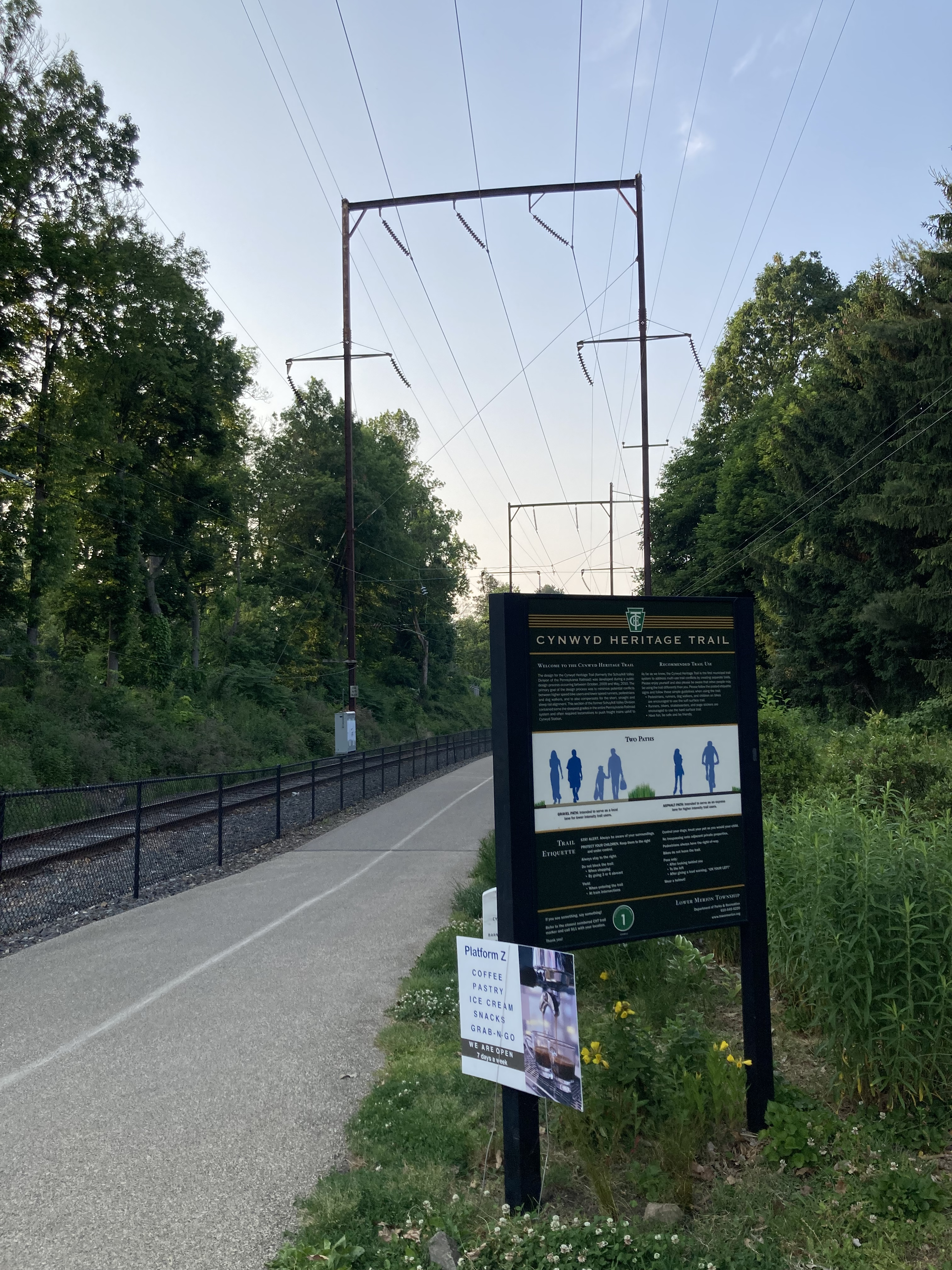
The trail in May.

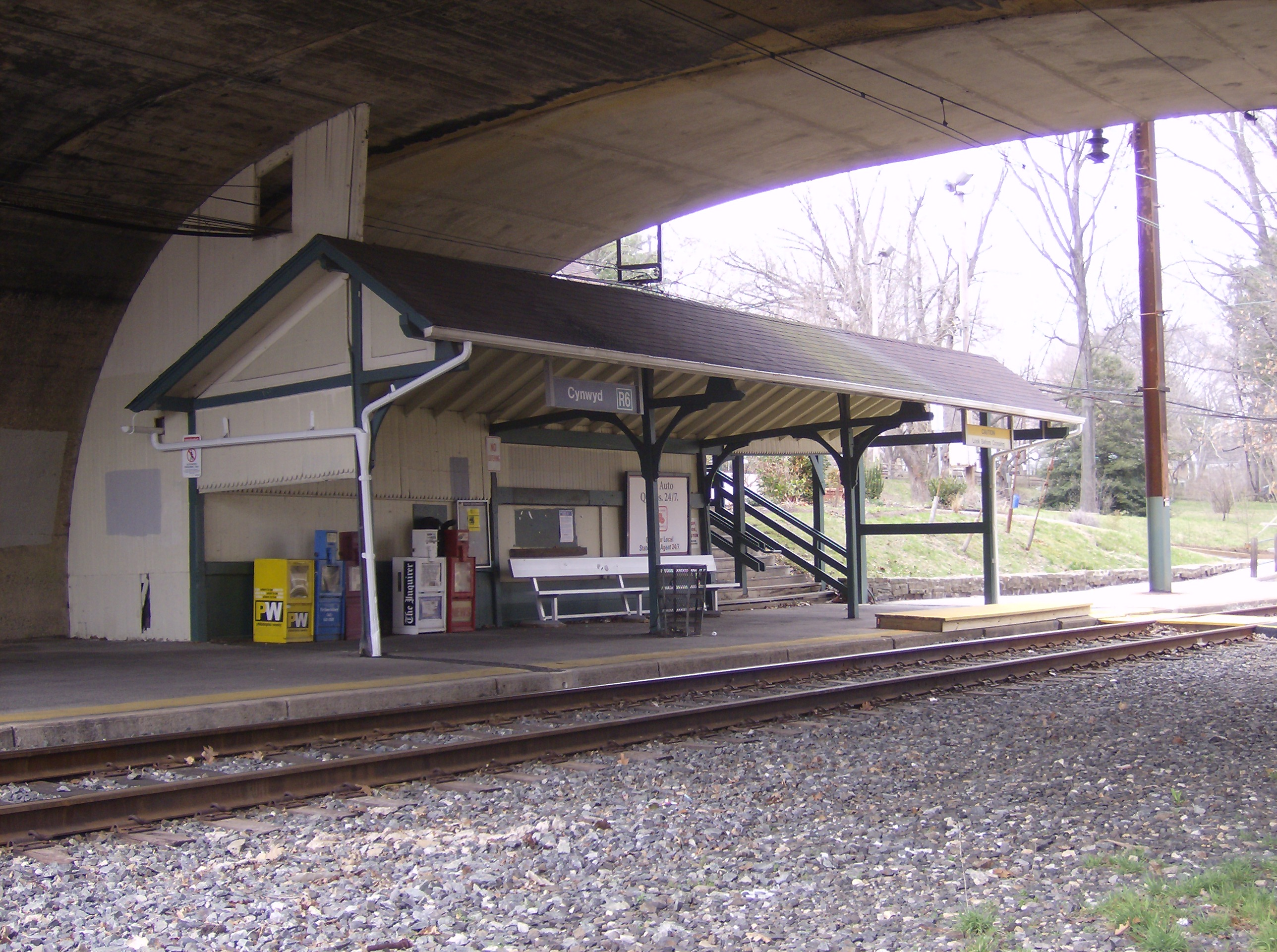
The end of the trail at Cynwyd Station.

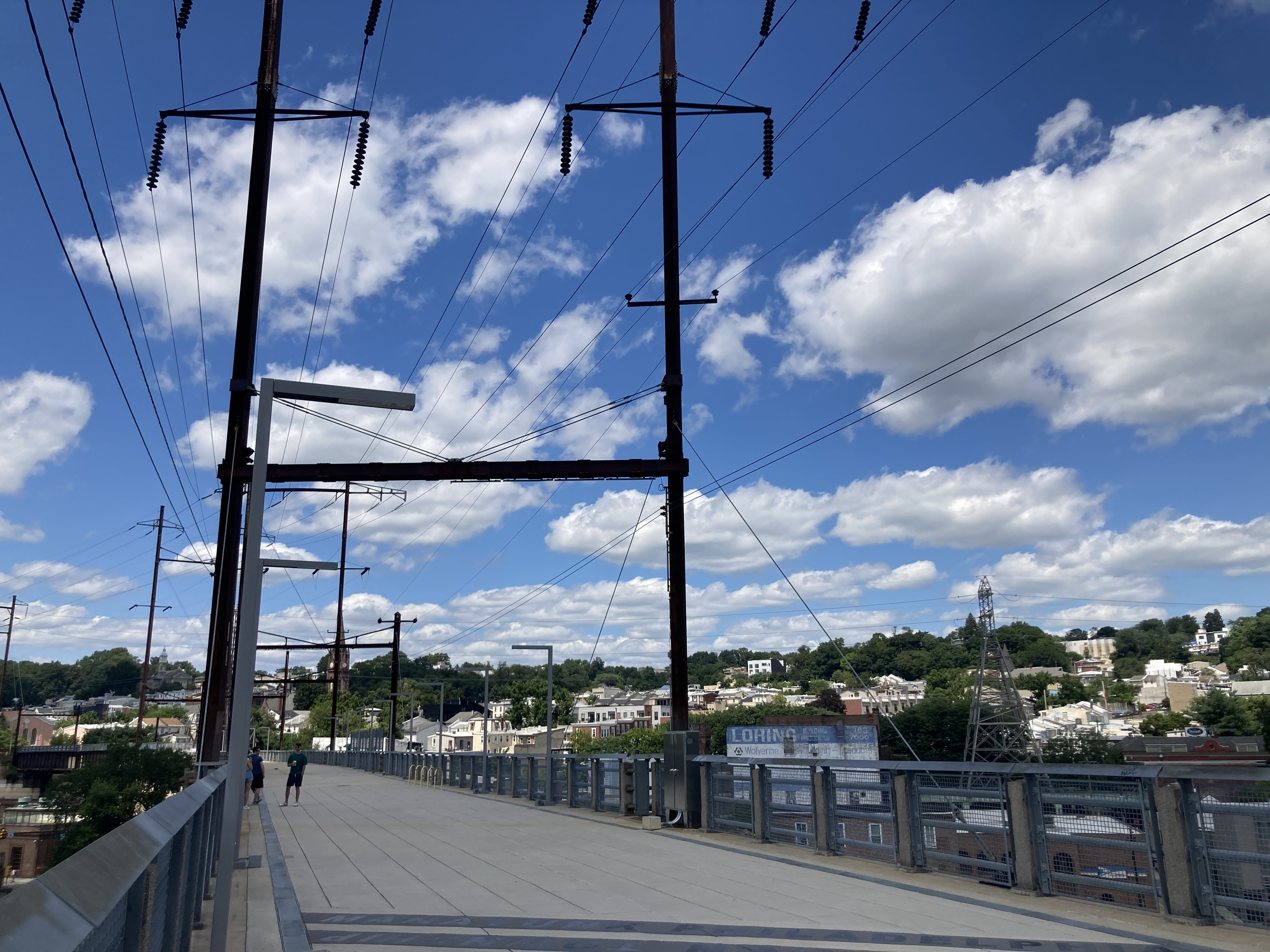
The Manayunk Bridge, where the trail enters Manayunk.
