= Manayunk Bridge =

Bridge in Pennsylvania

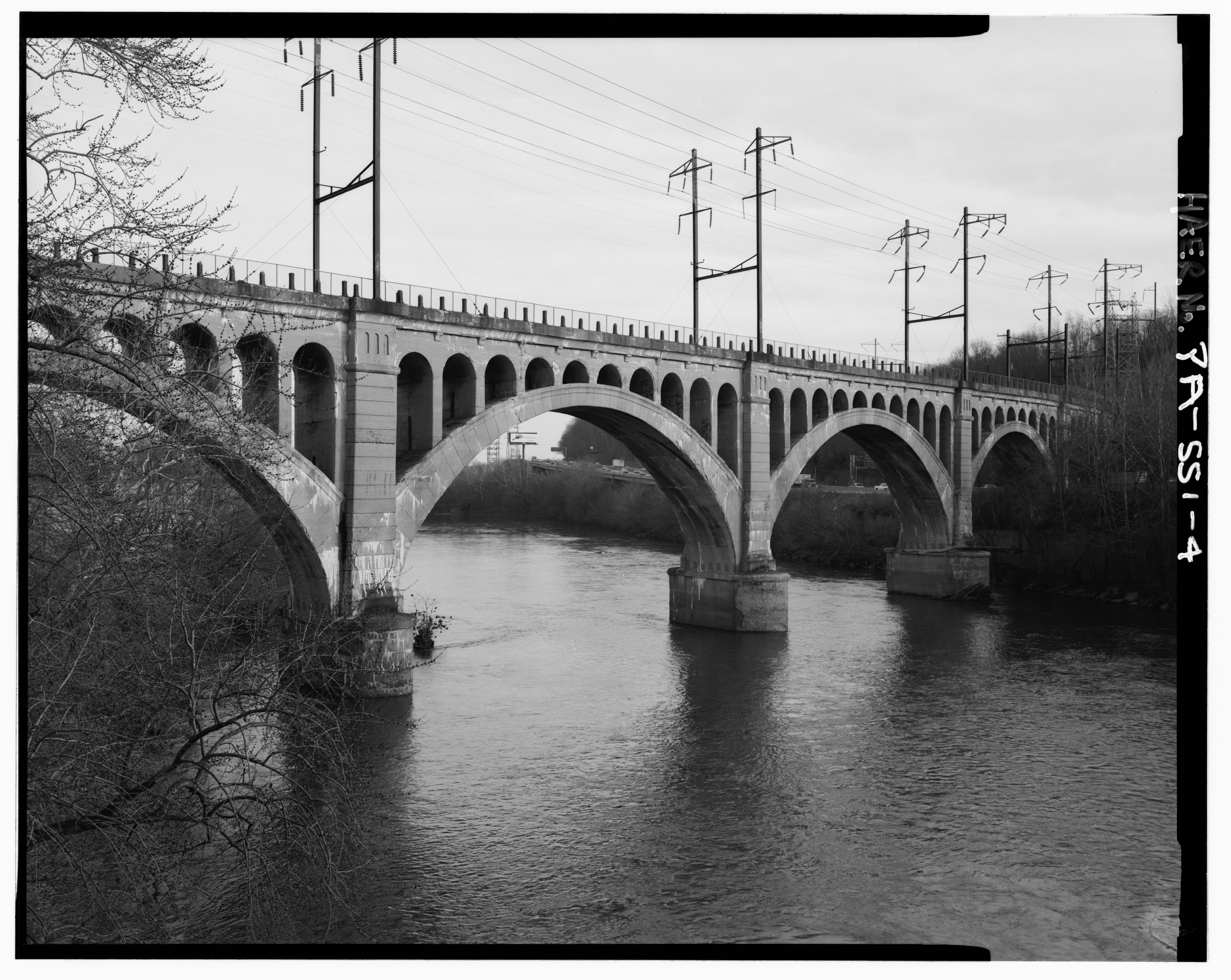
- The then-unused Manayunk Bridge in 1999
- Coordinates: 40°01′31″N 75°13′35″W
- Carries: Former SEPTA Ivy Ridge Line
- Crosses: Schuylkill River and Schuylkill Expressway
- Locale: Manayunk, Philadelphia, Pennsylvania
- Maintained by: SEPTA

Characteristics
- Design: Open spandrel deck arch
- Material: Concrete
- Longest span: 150 feet (46 m)
- No. of spans: 15
- Piers in water: 3

History
- Designer: Pennsylvania Railroad
- Constructed by: T. L. Eyre (Philadelphia)
- Construction end: 1918
- Closed: 1986, reopened as a trail bridge in 2015

Location
- Interactive map of Manayunk Bridge

The Manayunk Bridge (also known as the Manayunk Viaduct, Pencoyd Viaduct, and Schuylkill River Railroad Bridge) is an S-shaped former railroad bridge over the Schuylkill River, Schuylkill Canal and Schuylkill Expressway, that connects Bala Cynwyd, Montgomery County and the Manayunk neighborhood of Philadelphia, Pennsylvania. Closed to rail traffic in 1986, it is now an extension of the Cynwyd Heritage Trail (along the river's west bank) and connects to the Schuylkill River Trail (along the east bank).

== History ==
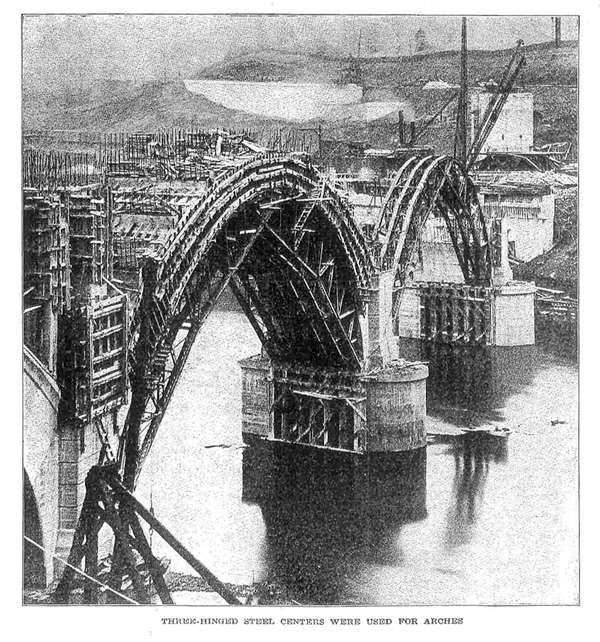
The bridge under construction, c. 1917

Built by the former Schuylkill Valley Division of the Pennsylvania Railroad, it is a large concrete open spandrel arch bridge built in an "S curve," earning both the current concrete bridge and its 1883 wrought-iron-truss predecessor the nickname of "S-Bridge." The bridge's challenging geometry was executed by T. L. Eyre, a Philadelphia contractor. Another notable feature is the saw-toothed construction joints along a 65-degree skew.

In 1976, SEPTA purchased the bridge for its Ivy Ridge Line (now Cynwyd Line). Ten years later, after weather-related expansion and contraction of the bridge, and the shedding of pieces of concrete due to spalling, SEPTA closed the bridge on October 25, 1986, truncating service at Cynwyd and suspended service to three of the line's six stations (Ivy Ridge, West Manayunk, and Barmouth). Between 1996 and 1999, the bridge was stabilized and refurbished. The effort determined that the internal steel reinforcement was not compromised, as SEPTA had feared. Further investigation by Urban Engineers determined that the bridge was safe and only needed surface work to stop the spalling. SEPTA did not resume service to Ivy Ridge; in 1996 low ridership led SEPTA to consider discontinuing service to Cynwyd altogether.

Between 2008 and June 2010, SEPTA removed the 2.5 miles (4.0 km) of tracks north of Cynwyd for the Cynwyd Heritage Trail and Ivy Ridge Rail Trail. The Manayunk Bridge Trail, a conversion of the bridge into a rail trail, opened on October 30, 2015.

== See also ==
- List of crossings of the Schuylkill River
- List of bridges documented by the Historic American Engineering Record in Pennsylvania
