= Miquon station =

SEPTA Regional Rail station

Coordinates: 40.0587°N 75.2665°W

Miquon
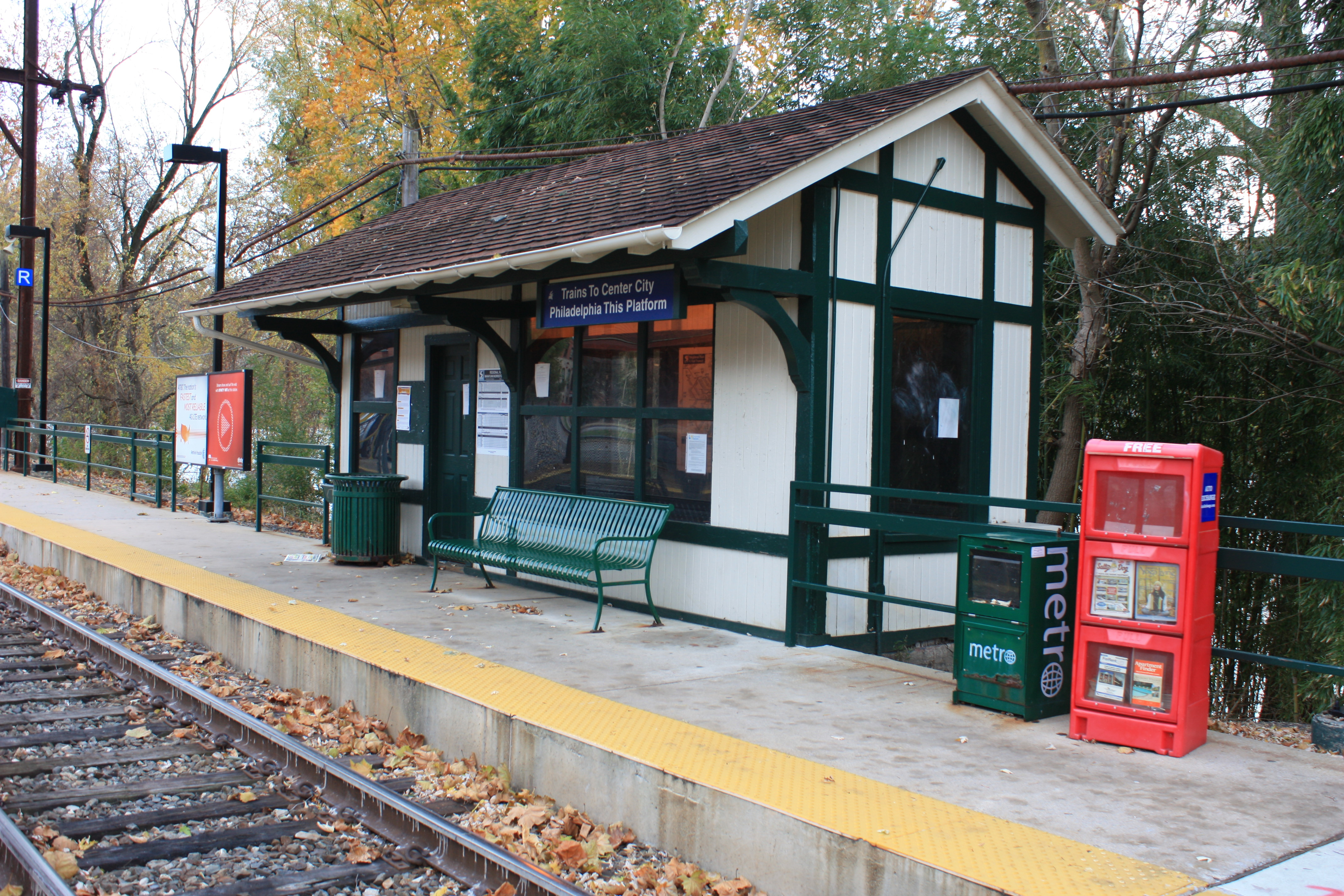
- The Center City-bound platform and shelter at Miquon station

General information
- Location: 1096 River Road; Whitemarsh Township, Pennsylvania 19452
- Owner: SEPTA
- Line: Norristown Branch
- Platforms: 2 side platforms
- Tracks: 2

Construction
- Parking: 230 spaces
- Accessible: No

Other information
- Fare zone: 2

History
- Opened: 1910
- Electrified: February 5, 1933
- Former names: Lafayette

Passengers
- 2017: 444 boardings 442 alightings (weekday average)
- Rank: 57 of 146

Services
Preceding station	SEPTA	Following station
Spring Mill toward Norristown–Elm Street	Manayunk/Norristown Line	Ivy Ridge toward Penn Medicine Station
Spring Mill toward Norristown–Elm Street	Manayunk/Norristown Line	Shawmont Closed 1996 toward Penn Medicine Station
Former services
Preceding station	Reading Railroad	Following station
Spring Mill toward Elm Street	Norristown Branch	Shawmont toward Philadelphia
Location

Miquon station is a suburban commuter railroad station on the SEPTA Manayunk/Norristown Line, located at River and Manor Roads in the Miquon section of Whitemarsh Township, Montgomery County, Pennsylvania, United States. It is the first station on the line outside Philadelphia.

In FY 2013, Miquon station had a weekday average of 483 boardings and 452 alightings.

The station is adjacent to a large office park (River Park I and II), which was redeveloped from a former paper mill in 1999. As of April 2013, parking includes about 60 spaces adjacent to the tracks along River Road, and 170 spaces in the River Park II lot; the latter lot has been shrinking in size due to the expansion of a private school (AIM Academy) which leased most of the River Park II complex beginning in 2011.

The station building on the outbound side is leased to an outside party and does not currently sell tickets. There is a shelter on the inbound side; connecting the two platforms is an official pedestrian crossing.

Miquon is expected to become a temporary turnback point for trains at times when the line is flooded by the Schuylkill River around Spring Mill and Conshohocken. A new remotely controlled interlocking has been built near the station for this purpose, as part of a project to install a modern cab signal system on the line.
