= Norristown =

Norristown may mean:

- Norristown, Arkansas, an unincorporated community
- Norristown, Georgia, an unincorporated community
- Norristown, Indiana, an unincorporated community
- Norristown, Pennsylvania, a borough
  - Norristown Transportation Center, a train station in Norristown
  - Other train stations in Norristown:
    - Main Street station (SEPTA)
    - Elm Street station
- Norristown, California, an ephemeral California Gold Rush settlement on the American River
