= Shawmont station =

Railway station in Philadelphia

Shawmont
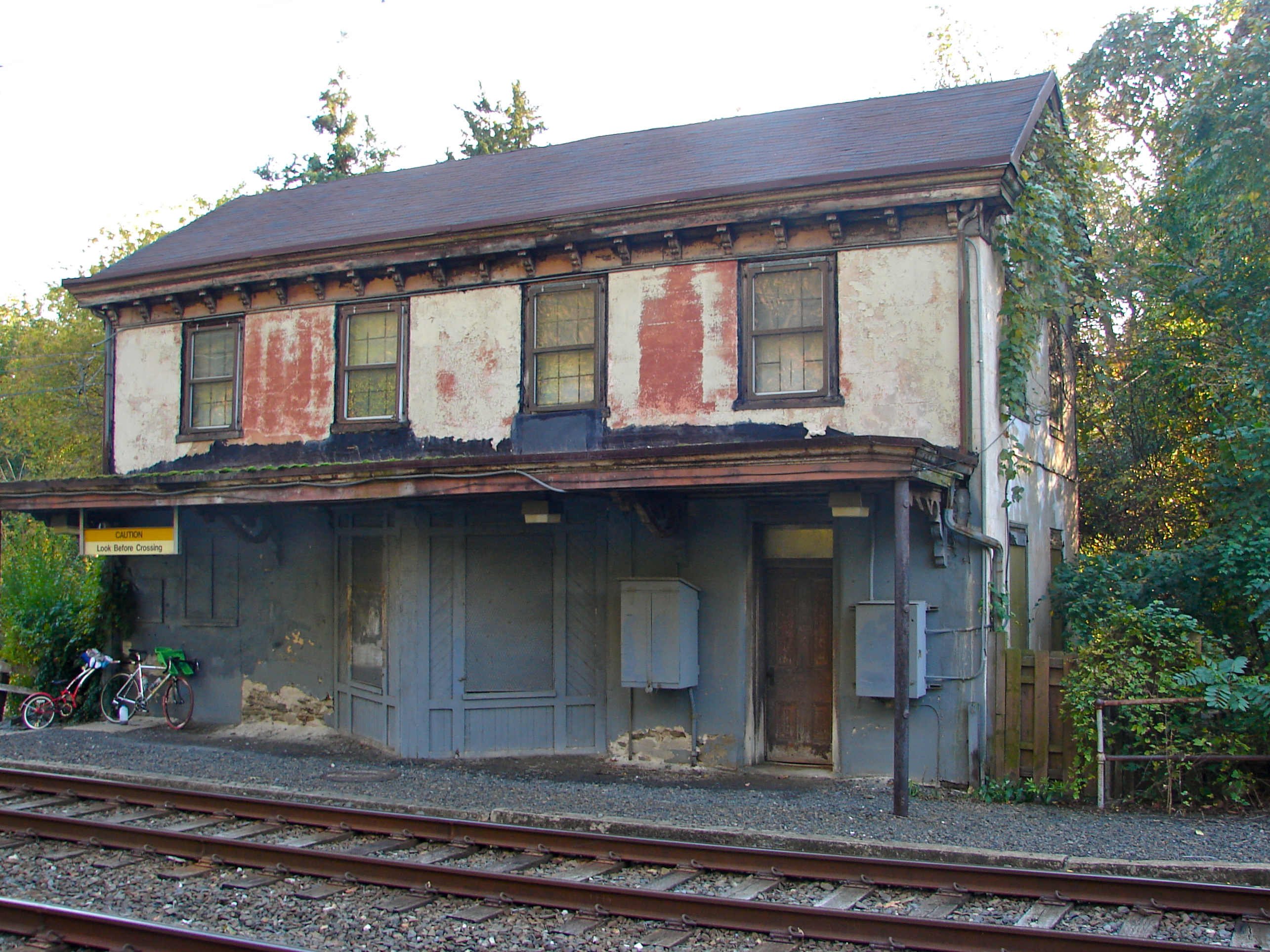
- The former Shawmont Reading station in 2010

General information
- Location: 7700 Nixon Street; Roxborough, Philadelphia, Pennsylvania, U.S.
- System: Former train station
- Owner: SEPTA
- Line: Norristown Branch
- Platforms: 1 side platform
- Tracks: 2

Construction
- Platform levels: 1

History
- Opened: 1834 (PG&N)
- Closed: 1996
- Electrified: February 5, 1933

Former services
| Preceding station | SEPTA | Following station |
|---|---|---|
| Miquon toward Norristown–Elm Street | Manayunk/Norristown Line | Ivy Ridge toward Penn Medicine Station |
| Preceding station | Reading Railroad | Following station |
| Miquon toward Elm Street | Norristown Branch | Glen Willow toward Philadelphia |
- Shawmont Train Station, Philadelphia and Reading Railroad
- U.S. Historic district – Contributing property
- Interactive map of Shawmont Train Station, Philadelphia and Reading Railroad
- Coordinates: 40°2′38″N 75°15′0″W
- Part of: Upper Roxborough Historic District (ID01000463)
- Added to NRHP: July 21, 1995
Location

Shawmont is a former train station in Philadelphia, Pennsylvania. It is located on Nixon Street in the Roxborough section of Lower Northwest Philadelphia. Rebuild from a former private residence by the Philadelphia, Germantown and Norristown Railroad, it later became part of the Reading Railroad and ultimately SEPTA Regional Rail's R6 Norristown Line. SEPTA made the station a whistle stop and closed its waiting room in 1991. SEPTA later closed the station in 1996.

The station building became a part of the Philadelphia Register of Historic Places, and in 2018 $1 million was awarded to rehabilitate the building, although it will not serve as a train station once repairs are complete.

== History ==
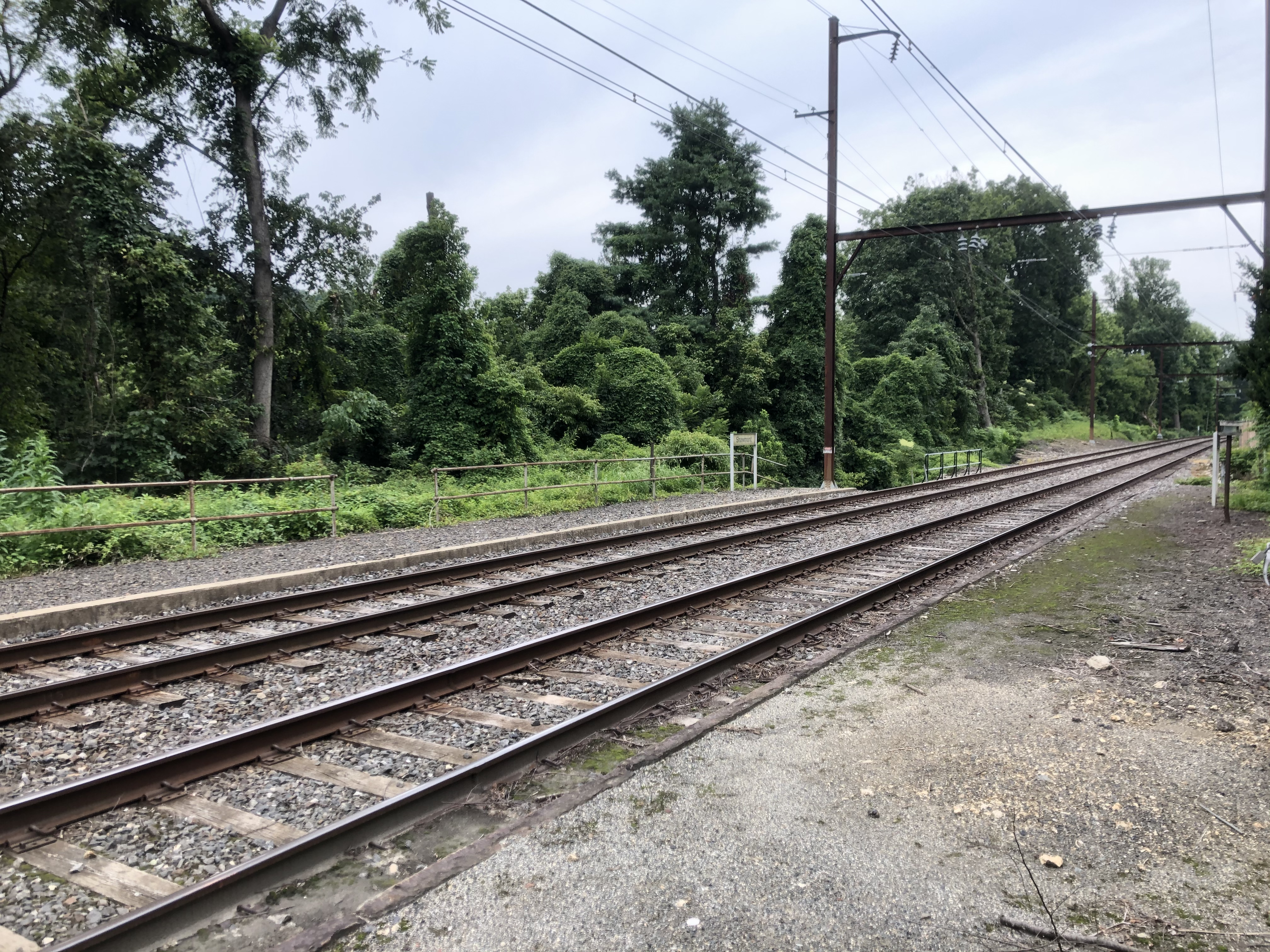
The Shawmont station platform

The building that became Shawmont station was constructed in 1826 as the private country residence of Nathan Nathans. The 18-by-36-foot (5.5 m × 11.0 m) stone house was constructed of local schist and its design is attributed to renowned architect William Strickland. Nathans owned this house for only four years, as in 1830 he sold it to a local grain mill operator John Wise. The area soon entered a phase of rapid industrialization. The following year the Pennsylvania Legislature granted a charter to the Philadelphia, Germantown and Norristown Railroad (PG&N). The line's southern route along the Schuylkill River came through by 1834 and in close proximity to the house. In 1835 rail service started and the house was sold to lumber businessman Henry Croskey who added it to his adjacent property. Croskey renovated the building as a passenger shelter and freight office for his lumber business and named it “Green Tree Station”. In 1857, Croskey sold Green Tree Station and its grounds to the Railroad.

On December 1, 1870, the PG&N was leased by the Philadelphia and Reading Railway (later the Reading Company). The station then underwent extensive renovations. A bay window replaced the center doorway and the first floor altered to accommodate a telegraph operator and ticket window. A waiting room was created by removing the windows toward the platform and converted them into doorways. A rear addition provided housing for a resident Station Master. In 1873 the competing Pennsylvania Railroad had built a station in nearby Chester County, which was also named “Green Tree”. The Reading then changed Green Tree Station in Philadelphia County to Shawmont Station, for local resident and inventor Thomas Shaw.

By 1884, the Pennsylvania Railroad had joined the competition with the Schuylkill Branch, a line that ran parallel to the Norristown line with a Shawmont station of its own.

In 1909, the Brendel family took up residence in Shawmont station to become permanent stationmasters.

The Pennsylvania Railroad electrified its line in 1930, and the Reading Company followed suit a year later.

Railroad service declined after World War II, and the Pennsylvania Railroad closed its Shawmont station on October 30, 1960, terminating all passenger service north of Manayunk. SEPTA began arranging new contracts with the PRR and RDG to continue commuter rail services in the Philadelphia region in 1966. In 1968, the Pennsylvania merged with their much larger rival, the New York Central Railroad to form the Penn Central Railroad. Penn Central filed for bankruptcy on June 21, 1970. In 1971, the Reading filed for bankruptcy as well. In 1976, the Reading and Penn Central were both acquired by Conrail, which provided commuter rail services under contract to SEPTA until January 1, 1983, when SEPTA assumed operations. SEPTA had already ended diesel service to Reading and Pottsville in 1981.

Shawmont station became a contributing property of the Upper Roxborough Historic District in 1995, but was closed by SEPTA in 1996. The last of the Brendel's descendants moved out of the station in 2013 after occupying the property for 104 years.

In 2009, the building was added to the Philadelphia Register of Historic Places, preserving it from potential destruction. In 2018, the Delaware Valley Regional Planning Commission gave $1 million to rehabilitate the former station. Structural repair work finally began in February 2023. As of August 2023, the exterior work was nearing completion, with the façade restored to its 1870 appearance. When completed, SEPTA will seek a tenant for the building. There are no plans to reactivate it as a train stop.

In September 2026 SEPTA and the City of Philadelphia reached a tentative agreement where the former station building would be leased by SEPTA to the City. The City would then renovate the interior and sublease the building to a local historical group for use as a museum and community space.
