= Spring Mill station =

Railway station in Conshohocken, Pennsylvania

Coordinates: 40.0742°N 75.2860°W

Spring Mill
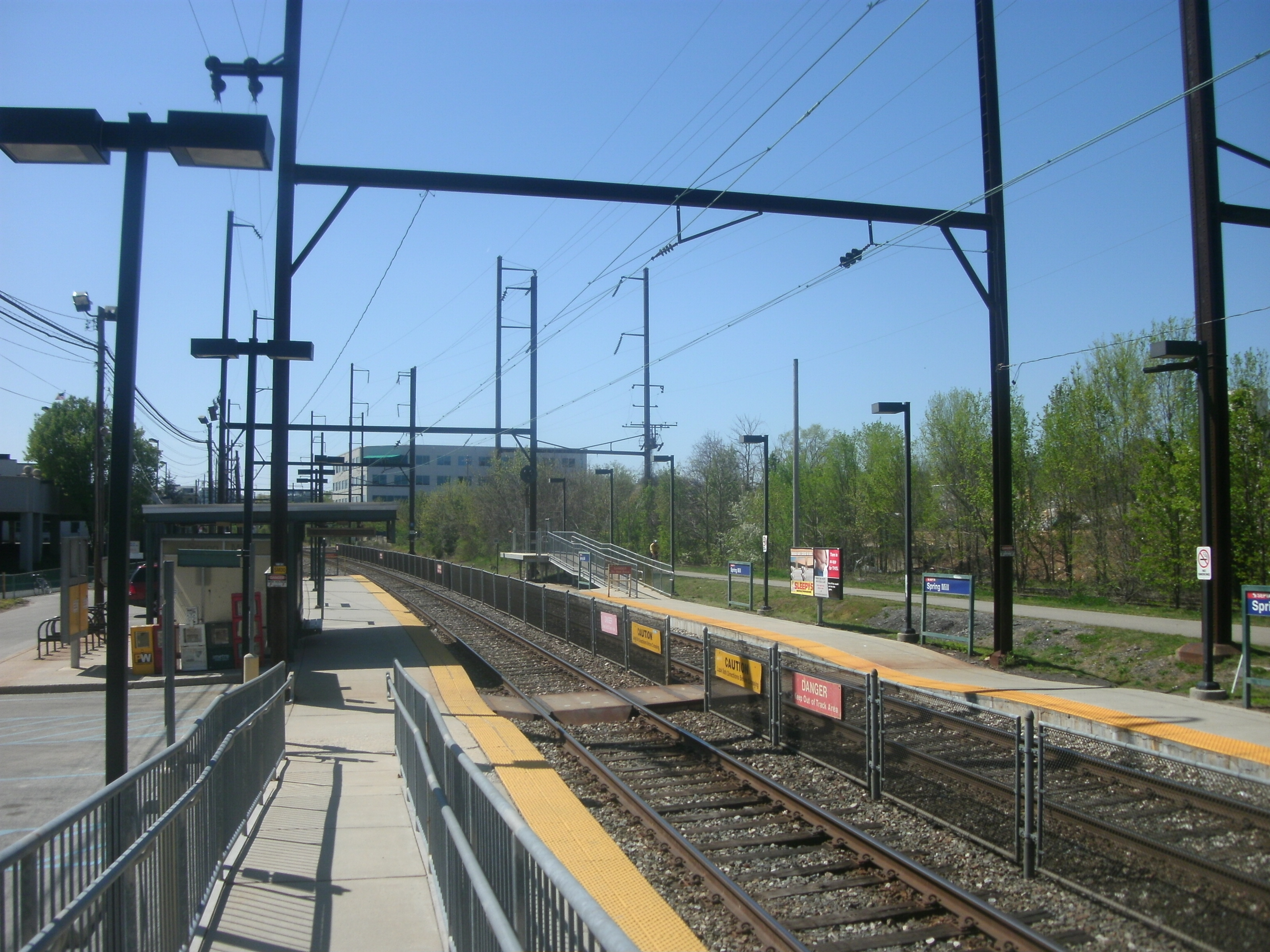
- Spring Mill station in April 2012. The Schuylkill River Trail is visible to the right.

General information
- Location: 98 Station Avenue, Conshohocken, Pennsylvania 19428
- Owner: SEPTA
- Line: Norristown Branch
- Platforms: 2 side platforms
- Tracks: 2
- Connections: Schuylkill River Trail

Construction
- Parking: 154 spaces
- Accessible: Yes

Other information
- Fare zone: 3

History
- Electrified: February 5, 1933

Passengers
- 2017: 509 boardings 521 alightings (weekday average)
- Rank: 49 of 146

Services
Preceding station	SEPTA	Following station
Conshohocken toward Norristown–Elm Street	Manayunk/Norristown Line	Miquon toward Penn Medicine Station
Former services
Preceding station	Reading Railroad	Following station
Conshohocken toward Elm Street	Norristown Branch	Miquon toward Philadelphia
Location

Spring Mill station is a suburban commuter railroad station on the SEPTA Manayunk/Norristown Line in Montgomery County, Pennsylvania. Its official address is Station Avenue near Hector Street, Conshohocken (ZIP code 19428), but it is actually in the Spring Mill section of Whitemarsh Township. The station is located south of Hector Street, where North Lane deadends at the Schuylkill River.

The original station was established by the Reading Railroad about 1880, and took its name from the nearby 18th-century grist mill.

In FY 2013, Spring Mill station had a weekday average of 378 boardings and 358 alightings. It has a 154-space parking lot, and is handicapped-accessible. The Schuylkill River Trail passes next to the station.

Due to the proximity of the Schuylkill River and a pair of tributary streams, the station is periodically subjected to flooding, resulting in the temporary suspension of all service on the Manayunk/Norristown Line. A project to replace the line's signal system is underway in 2013 that is intended to confine future flooding closures on the line to the section above Miquon station, by allowing partial service further down the line instead of no service on the line at all.
