= Norristown Line (disambiguation) =

Norristown Line could refer to:

- the Norristown Branch, a physical railway line owned by SEPTA
- the Manayunk/Norristown Line, a commuter rail service that uses the Norristown Branch
- the Norristown High Speed Line, an interurban rapid transit service
