= Mill Spring =

Mill Spring may refer to:

- Mill Spring, Missouri, a village in Wayne County
- Mill Spring, North Carolina, an unincorporated community in Polk County

== See also ==
- Mill Springs (disambiguation)
- Spring Mill (disambiguation)
- Spring Mills (disambiguation)
