= Conshohocken station =

Rail station in Conshohocken, Pennsylvania, US

Conshohocken
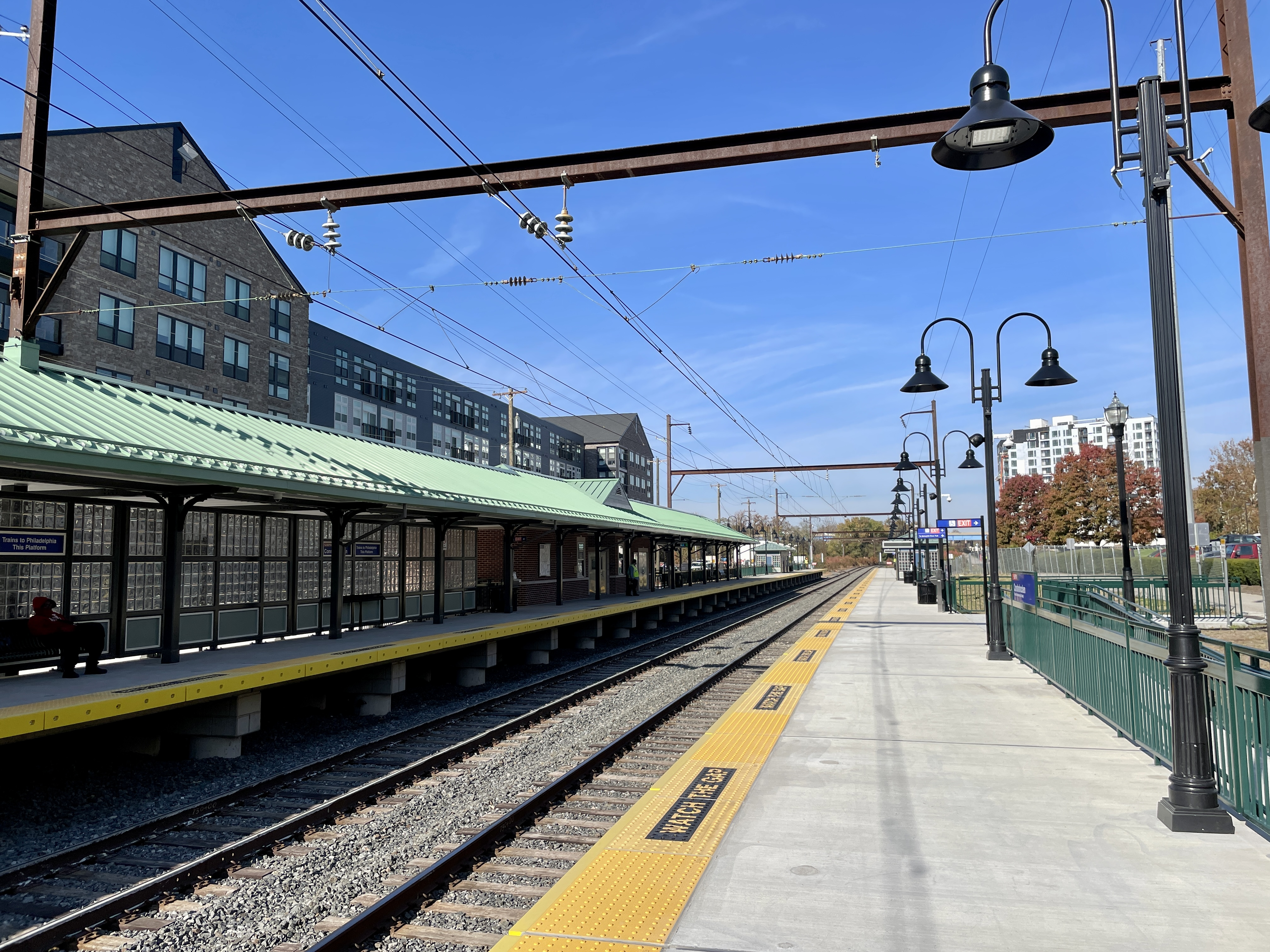
- Conshohocken station in November 2023

General information
- Location: 10 Washington Street, Conshohocken, Pennsylvania 19428
- Coordinates: 40.0721°N 75.3086°W
- Owner: SEPTA
- Line: Norristown Branch
- Platforms: 2 side platforms
- Tracks: 2
- Connections: SEPTA Suburban Bus: 95, 97; Schuylkill River Trail

Construction
- Parking: 95 spaces
- Accessible: Yes

Other information
- Fare zone: 3

History
- Rebuilt: November 6, 2023
- Electrified: February 5, 1933

Passengers
- 2017: 771 boardings 747 alightings (weekday average)
- Rank: 27 of 146

Services
Preceding station	SEPTA	Following station
Norristown toward Norristown–Elm Street	Manayunk/Norristown Line	Spring Mill toward Penn Medicine Station
Former services
Preceding station	Reading Railroad	Following station
Norristown toward Pottsville	Main Line	Manayunk toward Philadelphia
Ivy Rock toward Elm Street	Norristown Branch	Spring Mill toward Philadelphia
Terminus	Plymouth Branch	Plymouth Meeting toward Oreland
Location

Conshohocken station is a station located along the SEPTA Manayunk/Norristown Line. The station, located below Fayette Street, at Washington and Harry Streets in Conshohocken, Pennsylvania, includes a 95-space parking lot. In FY 2013, Conshohocken station had a weekday average of 646 boardings and 682 alightings.

== Station layout ==
The station currently consists of two high-level side platforms and shelters to protect riders. The station building at the former low-level station, which was a trailer, was only open weekdays during the morning and early afternoon. Tickets could be purchased at the station during these times only. There is no ticket office at the current station. SEPTA's station should not be confused with the station building on the abandoned Pennsylvania Railroad Schuylkill Branch, which is now the Schuylkill River Trail. This building, located a short distance away up Harry Street, is now a privately owned café and does not sell tickets.

== Station rebuilding ==
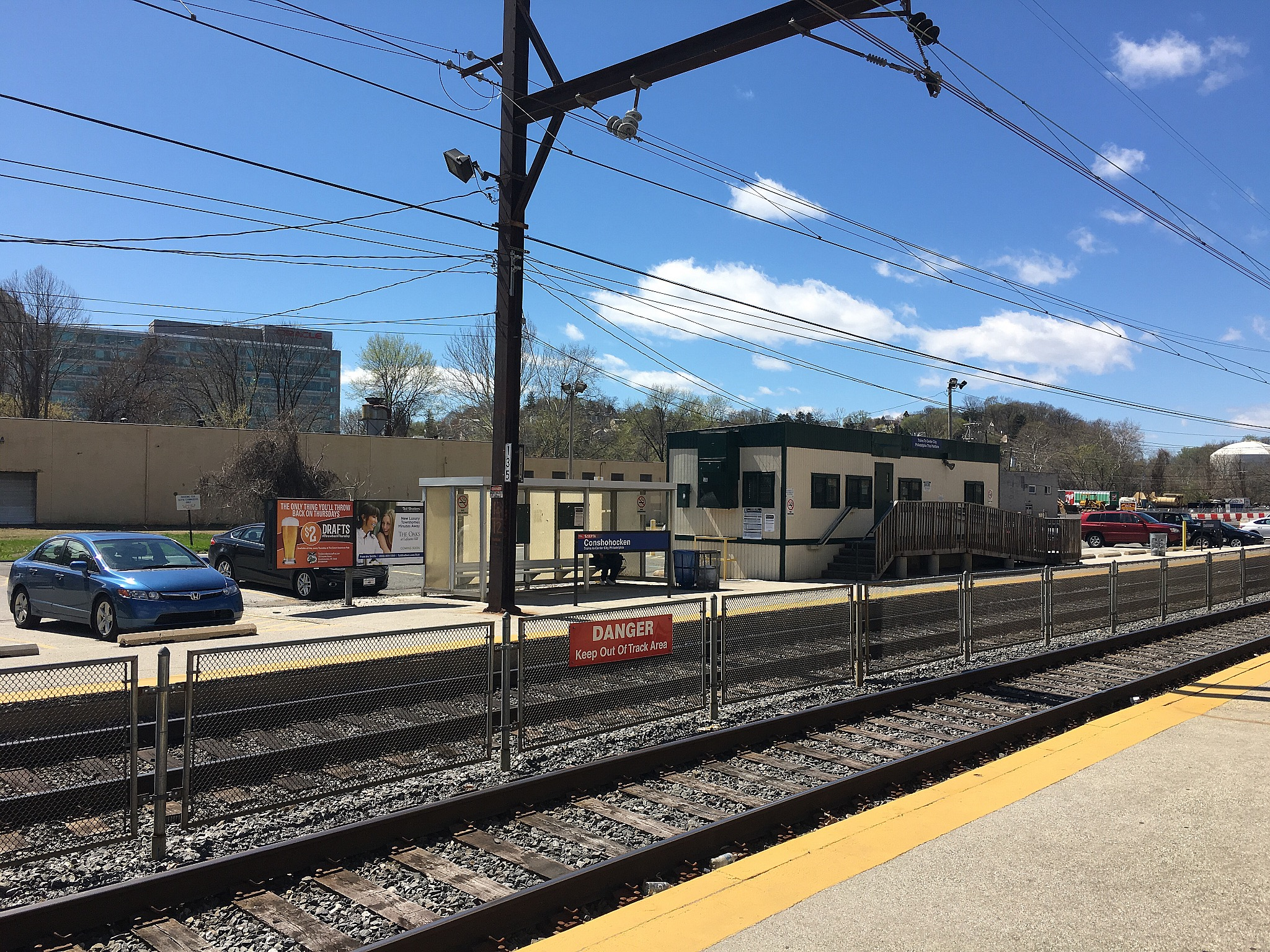
Former Conshohocken station with low-level platforms

In 2018, SEPTA proposed a new station would be built downline (towards Norristown) from the current station. This new station includes a larger awning on the inbound platform, high platforms to allow level entry to the train, and ADA compliance. The estimated cost of the project was $13.25 million, and originally set to be complete in winter 2022. However, the new station opened on November 6, 2023.
