= Miquon, Pennsylvania =

Unincorporated community in Pennsylvania, US

- Unincorporated community
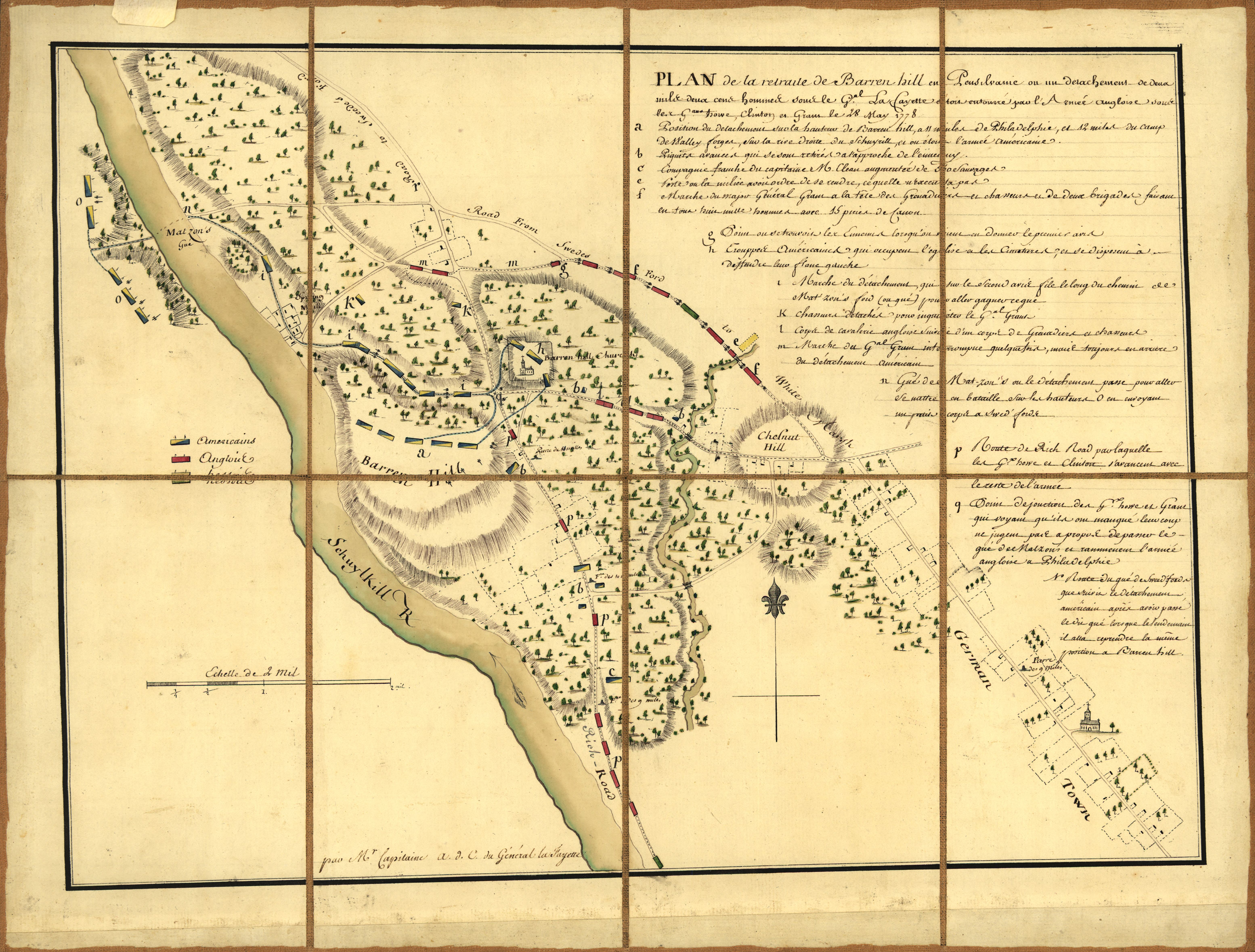
- Battle of Barren Hill, 20 May 1778. Miquon includes Barren Hill and the area south of it.

- Location within the state of Pennsylvania Miquon, Pennsylvania (the United States)
- Coordinates: 40°04′2.75″N 75°16′8.33″W
- Country: United States of America
- State: Pennsylvania
- County: Montgomery
- Township: Whitemarsh; Springfield
- Time zone: UTC-5 (EST)
  - Summer (DST): UTC-4 (EDT)
- ZIP codes: 19444; 19428
- Area code: 610

Miquon is an unincorporated community in Montgomery County, Pennsylvania, United States. Located partly in Whitemarsh Township and partly in Springfield Township, it lies between the Roxborough section of Philadelphia and the Spring Mill section of Whitemarsh Township. Its borders are, roughly, Barren Hill Road, Ridge Pike, Manor Road, and the Schuylkill River. The sections of Miquon along the river and west of Harts Lane share the 19428 zip code with Conshohocken. The section east of Harts Lane shares the 19444 zip code with Lafayette Hill.

The name “Miquon” is derived from the language of the Lenni-Lenape people, who were the original inhabitants.

The notable Battle of Barren Hill during the Revolutionary War began just east of Miquon (on May 20, 1778): When set upon by some 16,000 British troops, the Marquis de Lafayette and his 2,200 Continental troops eluded capture by retreating through Miquon, across the river, and back to their camp at Valley Forge.

In the 19th century, Miquon became a center of the papermaking industry. The W. C. Hamilton Paper Company operated its mills along the river there until the mid 20th century. In 1999, the former mill buildings were redeveloped into an office complex (named River Park I and River Park II). In 2012, River Park II became the campus of AIM Academy, a private secondary school.

The tracks of the old Reading Railroad run through Miquon along the Schuylkill River. In around 1880, that railroad opened a passenger station in Miquon, at Manor Road, known as Lafayette Station. The design of the building that housed that station is attributed to the architect Frank Furness. It remained the local passenger railroad station until 1910, and the building still stands today.

Miquon’s current local passenger railroad station, built around 1910 (and renamed “Miquon Station” in 1921) is located to the southeast of the old station building; the old Reading Railroad tracks now carry the Manayunk/Norristown Line.

== Landmarks ==
- The Miquon School
- Miquon Station

== Notable person ==
- Derek Bok, former president of Harvard University and son of Margaret Plummer Bok
- Margaret Plummer Bok, co-founder of The Miquon School (1932)
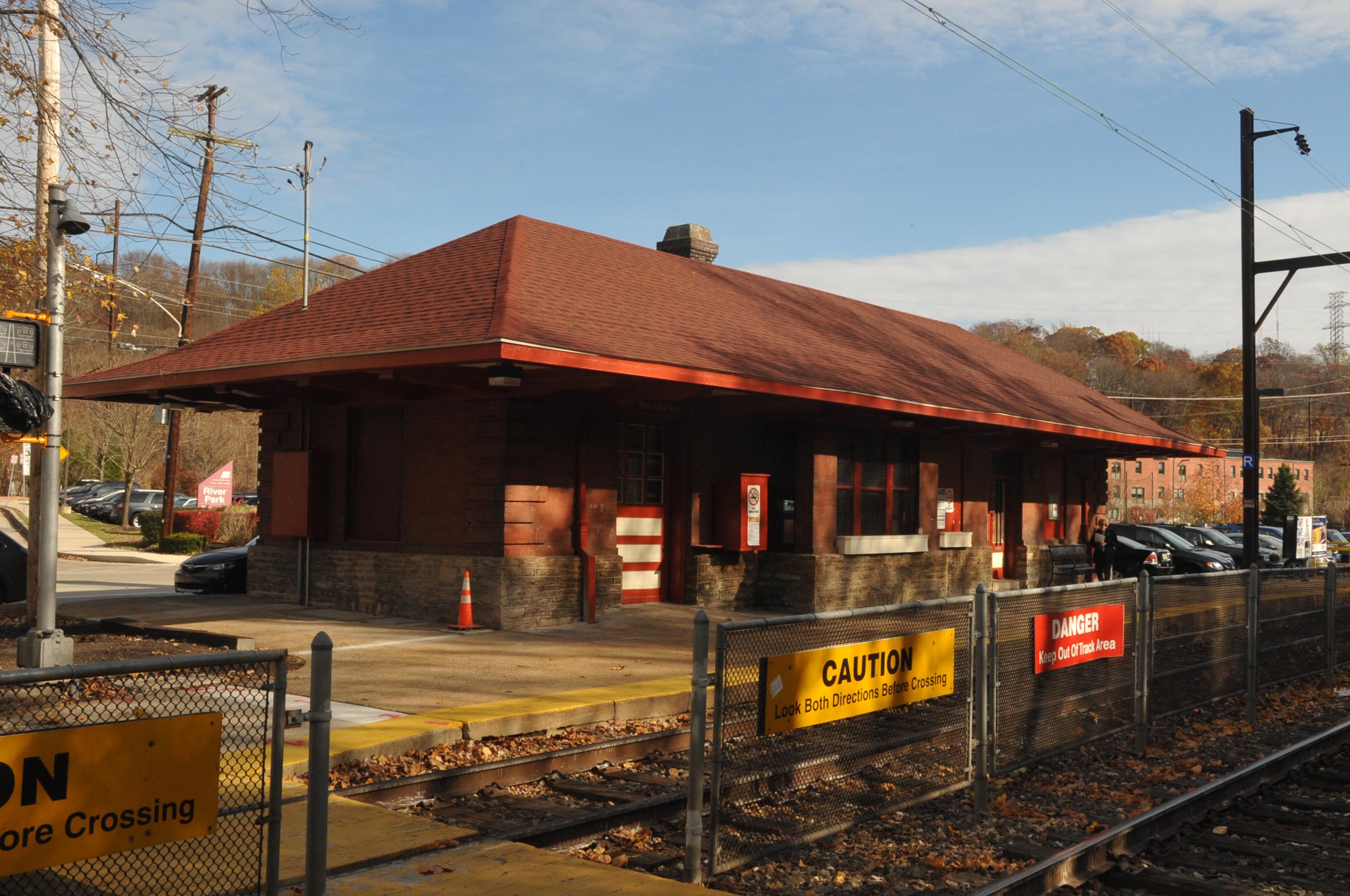
Miquon station

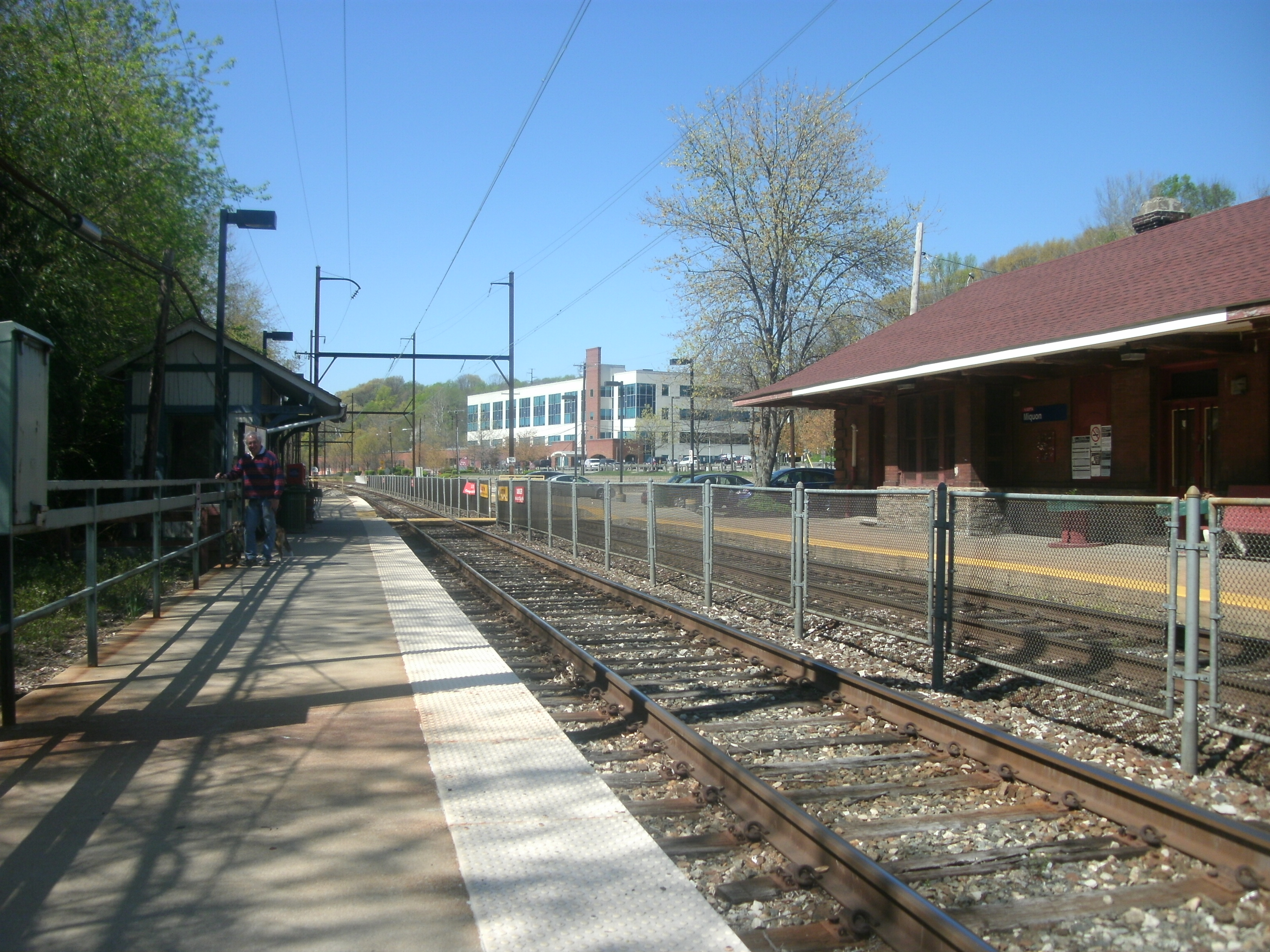
Miquon station in 2012. River Park I is in the background.
