= Spring Mill =

Spring Mill may refer to:

- Spring Mill (Batesville, Arkansas), an historic industrial property
- Spring Mill State Park, Indiana
- Spring Mill, Kentucky, a town
- Spring Mill, New Jersey
- Spring Mill, Pennsylvania, a community in Whitemarsh Township, Pennsylvania
  - Spring Mill (SEPTA station), a suburban commuter railroad station
- Spring Mill Complex, Devault, Pennsylvania, a historic grist mill complex

== See also ==
- Spring Mills (disambiguation)
