= Lee Tire and Rubber Company =

- U.S. National Register of Historic Places
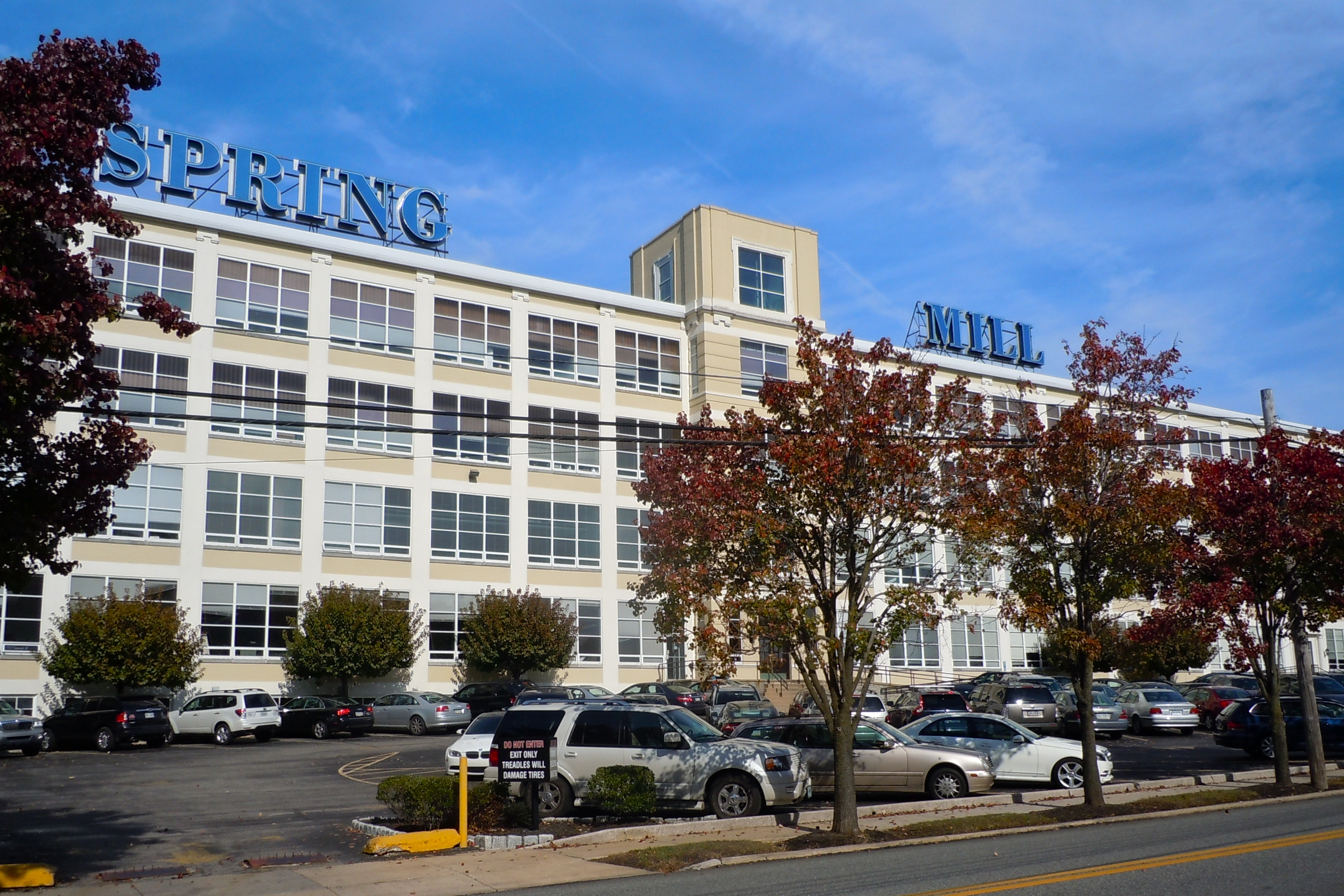
- Lee Tire and Rubber Company, November 2011

- Location within Pennsylvania Location within the United States
- Location: 1100 Hector St., Whitemarsh, Pennsylvania
- Coordinates: 40°04′34″N 75°17′17″W
- Area: 17 acres (6.9 ha)
- Built: 1909
- Architect: Steele, William
- NRHP reference No.: 84003512
- Added to NRHP: August 23, 1984

The Lee Tire and Rubber Company, now known as Lee Park, is an historic rubber and tire factory complex in the Spring Mill section of Whitemarsh, Montgomery County, Pennsylvania, United States.

It was added to the National Register of Historic Places in 1984.

== History and architectural features ==
The main building of this historic complex was built in 1909 as a vast, four-story, administration building. It is a symmetrical structure with terminating and central towers and features engaged Tuscan order columns framing the main entrance doors. The twelve remaining contributing buildings in the complex include one- and two-story, manufacturing buildings and a water tower (1909).

The company was incorporated in 1911 as the successor of the J Ellwood Lee Company established in 1883. Lee manufactured puncture-proof pneumatic tires, regular tires, and rubber sundries. Garthwaite Stadium in Conshohocken is named for the former president, Albert Alexander Garthwaite.
