= Stony Creek Branch =

Railway line in Pennsylvania

Overview
- Owner: SEPTA

History
- Opened: 30 December 1873

Technical
- Line length: 9.9 mi (15.9 km)

The Stony Creek Branch is a railway line in Montgomery County, Pennsylvania. It runs 9.9 miles (15.9 km) from Lansdale, Pennsylvania, to Norristown, Pennsylvania, connecting the Bethlehem and Doylestown Branches with the Norristown Branch. Although SEPTA owns the line, it is freight-only. CSX Transportation, Norfolk Southern Railway, and the Pennsylvania Northeastern Railroad have trackage rights on the branch.

== History ==
The Stony Creek Railroad was incorporated on April 14, 1868, to build south from the North Pennsylvania Railroad main line at Lansdale along Stony Creek to Norristown, Pennsylvania. The line, 10.3 miles (16.6 km) long, opened on December 30, 1873, under the control of the North Pennsylvania. Its Norristown station was located at Main and Markley, the present site of Norristown–Main Street.

The Philadelphia and Reading Railroad leased the North Pennsylvania on May 14, 1879. The Reading, through the Norristown Junction Railroad, built a connection between Norristown Branch and the Stony Creek Railroad in 1880. Under the Reading, the division point between the two lines shifted north, with the Norristown Branch moving north to include the Norristown–Main Street and Norristown–Elm Street stations. The truncated Stony Creek Branch stood at 9.9 miles (15.9 km).

The Stony Creek Railroad was one of twelve railroads merged into the Reading Company effective December 31, 1945. On the Reading's final bankruptcy in 1976 the branch was conveyed to SEPTA, with Conrail retaining trackage rights. Today, CSX Transportation, Norfolk Southern Railway, and the Pennsylvania Northeastern Railroad have trackage rights on the branch.
