= Norristown Transit Center =

Passenger transportation hub in Norristown, Pennsylvania

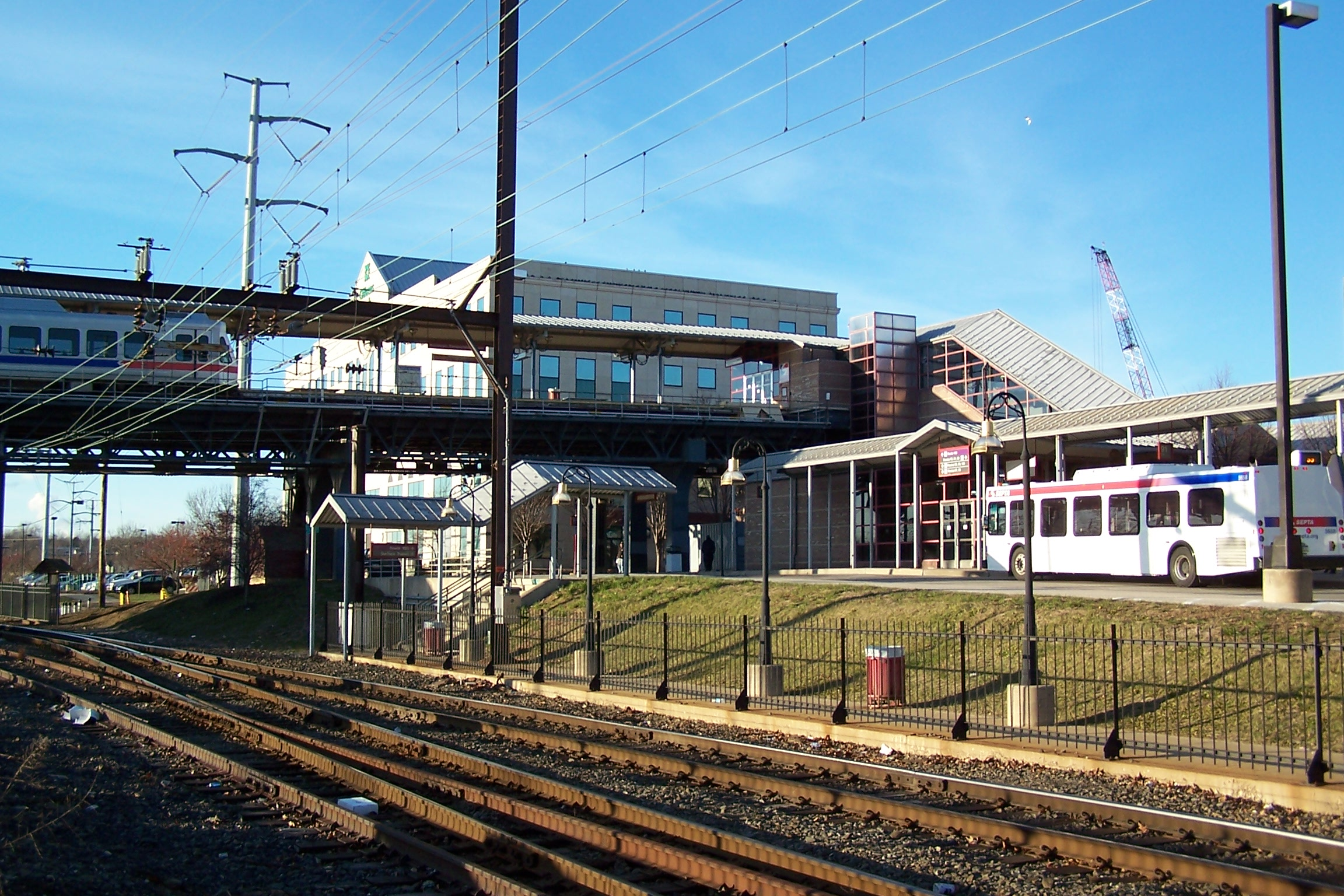
- The M platform (top) and a bus station (right), taken from the Manayunk/Norristown Line platform

General information
- Location: DeKalb and East Lafayette Streets; Norristown, Pennsylvania, U.S. United States
- Coordinates: 40°06′47″N 75°20′42″W
- Owner: SEPTA
- Line: Norristown Branch
- Platforms: 2 side platforms
- Tracks: 2
- Connections: SEPTA Suburban Bus: 90, 91, 93, 96, 97, 98, 99, 131; Schuylkill River Trail

Construction
- Parking: 520 space parking garage 136 Free surface parking 44 with permits
- Cycle facilities: 4 racks
- Accessible: Partial: NHSL platforms only

Other information
- Fare zone: 3 (Regional Rail)

History
- Rebuilt: 15 June 1989
- Electrified: 25 Hz overhead line (Regional Rail); Third rail (NHSL)

Passengers
- 2017: 856 boardings 781 alightings (weekday average) (Regional Rail)
- Rank: 20 of 146 (Regional Rail)

Services
Preceding station	SEPTA	Following station
Norristown–Main Street toward Norristown–Elm Street	Manayunk/Norristown Line	Conshohocken toward Penn Medicine Station
Preceding station	SEPTA Metro	Following station
Terminus	M (SEPTA Metro)	Bridgeport toward 69th Street T.C.
Former services
Preceding station	SEPTA	Following station
Valley Forge Park toward Pottsville	Pottsville Line	North Broad Street toward Reading Terminal
Preceding station	Lehigh Valley Transit Company	Following station
Main Street toward Allentown	Liberty Bell High Speed Line Until 1951	Bridgeport via Rink station toward 69th Street
Preceding station	Reading Railroad	Following station
Abrams toward Pottsville	Main Line	Conshohocken toward Philadelphia
Main Street toward Elm Street	Norristown Branch	Mogees toward Philadelphia
Track layout
Location

Norristown Transit Center is a two-level multimodal public transportation regional hub located in Norristown, Pennsylvania and operated by SEPTA. It opened in 1989, replacing the older M terminus one block away at Main and Swede Streets, and integrated the former Reading Company's DeKalb Street Norristown railroad station (built 1933) into its structure. A plaque embedded in the sidewalk between the bus lane and Lafayette Street commemorates the location of one of the columns of the dismantled segment of the Philadelphia and Western Railroad (P&W) trestle.

== Regional Rail service ==
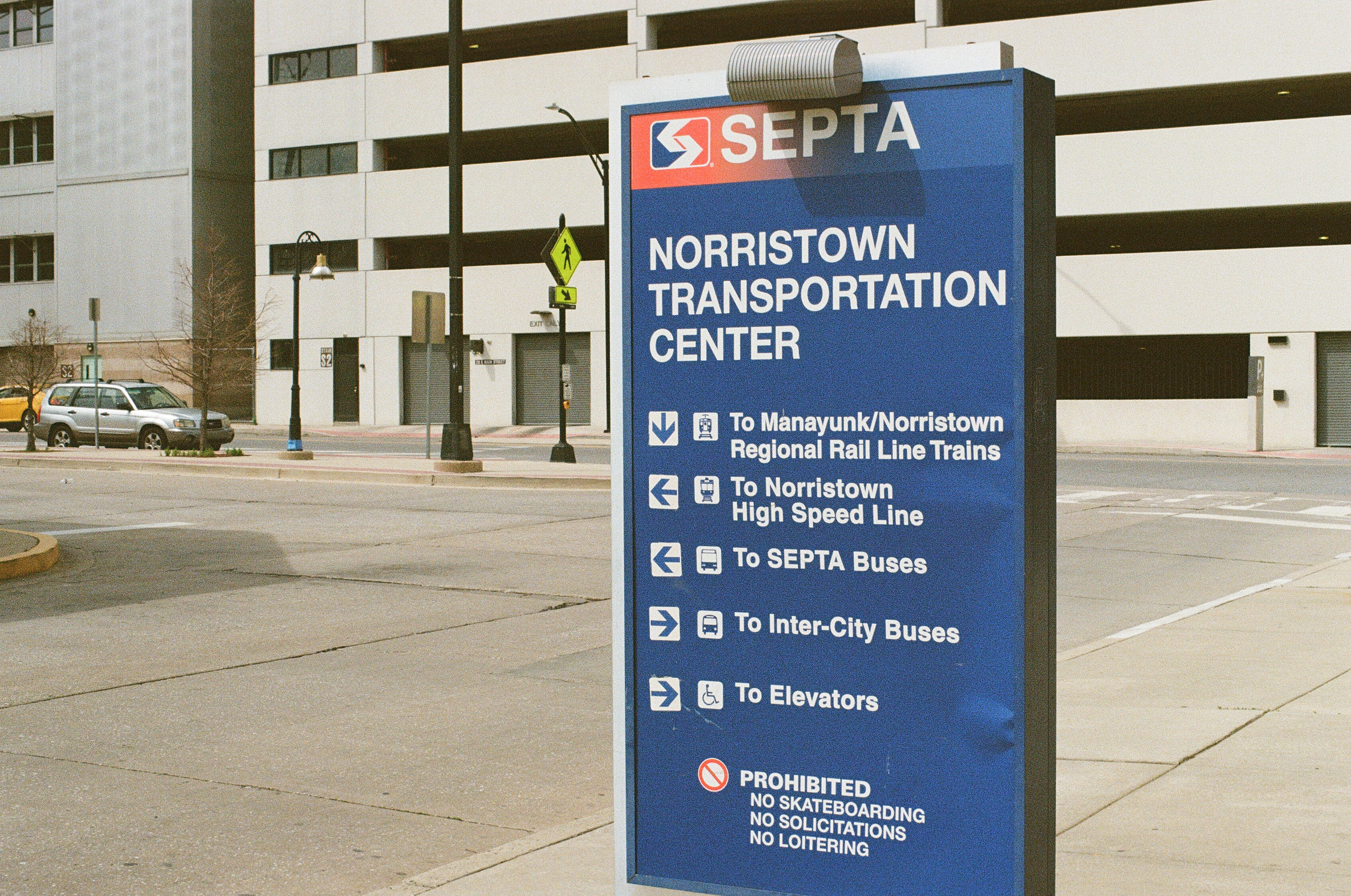
Wayfinding sign outside of the transit center.

The Norristown Transit Center is a stop on the Manayunk/Norristown Regional Rail Line, which offers service to Center City Philadelphia via Conshohocken and Manayunk.

In 2017, the regional rail service at Norristown Transit Center had a weekday average of 856 boardings and 781 alightings.

== Metro service ==
Norristown Transit Center is the final stop on the M, which runs from 69th Street Transit Center in Upper Darby to Norristown.

== Bus routes ==
In addition to rail service, Norristown Transit Center serves as the center of the Frontier District of SEPTA's Suburban Division bus routes, particularly the routes operating in Montgomery County. Bus routes serving NTC operate with a "timed transfer"; for the most part, buses leave at the same time, to maximize possible transfers between routes. These routes serve areas of Norristown and other areas in Montgomery County.

SEPTA Frontier District routes that serve Norristown Transit Center are:

- 90 - to Plymouth Meeting Mall via Penn Square
- 91 - to SCI Phoenix via Eagleville (Saturdays only)
- 93 - to Pottstown via Collegeville and Philadelphia Premium Outlets
- 96- to Lansdale via Montgomery Mall and North Wales
- 97 - to Chestnut Hill via Barren Hill and Conshohocken
- 98 - to Blue Bell via Plymouth Meeting Mall
- 99 - to Phoenixville via King of Prussia Transit Center at King of Prussia Mall, Audubon and Oaks
- 131 - to Audubon and Valley Forge Corporate Complex via Jeffersonvill

NTC is located at DeKalb and Lafayette Streets near the banks of the Schuylkill River and boasts a parking garage (built in 2008). Along with the opening of the new garage, intercity bus service by Bieber Transportation Group, Greyhound, and Martz Trailways was introduced to Norristown. Bieber Transportation Group ended service to Norristown on April 1, 2018 while Martz Trailways service ended May 31, 2018.

Norristown Transit Center was formerly an important transfer point between electric and Budd Rail Diesel Car (RDCs) service to points north, such as Valley Forge, Phoenixville Pottstown, Reading and Pottsville. Pottsville line service was eliminated in 1981 due to budget cuts. Proposed restoration of service beyond Norristown, dubbed the Schuylkill Valley Metro, was canceled in 2006 after SEPTA failed to acquire necessary funding.
