= Mill Springs =

Mill Springs may refer to:

- Mill Springs, Kentucky
- Mill Springs Mill
- Battle of Mill Springs
  - Mill Springs Battlefield National Monument
  - Mill Springs National Cemetery

== See also ==
- Mill Spring (disambiguation)
