= AIM Academy =

Private school in Conshohocken, PA

Location
- Whitemarsh, Pennsylvania; United States; 40°3′34″N 75°16′1″W

Information
- Type: Private, Coed, Specialized in language-based learning differences
- Established: 2006
- Co-Founders: Pat Roberts & Nancy Blair
- Grades: 1-12
- Enrollment: 386 students
- Student to teacher ratio: Lower School 6:1, Middle and Upper School 8:1
- Campus: Suburban
- Website: www.aimpa.org

AIM Academy is an independent co-educational college prep school serving students with language-based learning differences in grades 1-12. AIM was founded in 2006 and moved to its current location in Conshohocken, Pennsylvania in 2012. The AIM Institute for Learning & Research provides professional learning opportunities grounded in the Science of Reading including online teacher training courses and access to researchers.

== Location ==
The campus is located in Conshohocken, Pennsylvania, across the street from Septa's R-7 Miquon station. It is 4 miles from Exit 16A on I-476 and 4 miles from exit 332 on I-76. Students come from Philadelphia and its surrounding suburban communities.

== Campus ==
The school is located in a century old brick building which originally housed a mill. The 60,000 sq. feet interior was designed and technologically enhanced in 2012 and includes classrooms, science labs, art studios, Global Resource Center, and an EEG Lab for in-school research partnerships including with the Haskins Global Literacy Hub. A turf field and playground were also added in 2012. The AIM Community Center (ACC) featuring a full-sized gymnasium, proscenium stage, blackbox theater, fitness center and classroom spaces for fine arts, media arts, music and drama instruction, was opened in Spring 2016. In January 2017, AIM Academy purchased the main school building and 4.5 acre campus from Buccini-Pollin Group. In 2021, construction began on a shipping container structure that will house AIM's new bike tech program for students and serve as a memorial to Samuel Ozer '20 who was killed while riding his bike home from work in June 2020. Close to 700 people and organizations donated funds for the creation of Sam's Place and Trek Bikes contribute the interior design work for the structure and outfitted it with the tools needed to run the bike tech program.

== History ==
AIM Academy and the AIM Institute were founded in 2006 by Pat Roberts and Nancy Blair to serve children with language-based learning differences in the Philadelphia area and to provide educators with access to the latest in literacy research. They modeled the new school after The Lab School in Washington. When they opened their doors, they enrolled 27 students. Ten years later the school grew to 302 students in grades 1-12. The school was originally located in Manayunk, Philadelphia, PA and called Academy in Manayunk. In response to their increasing student population, the school moved in 2012 to a new school building. The school was then renamed AIM Academy. Both AIM Academy and the AIM Institute for Learning & Research operate out of the River Road campus. The AIM Institute provides a variety of professional learning opportunities to educators in the area and throughout the country through annual events such as the Research to Practice Symposium, regular webinars and speakers as well as through more comprehensive training courses on the AIM Pathways training platform with courses focused on literacy training for teachers and support to help educators and education leaders implement techniques into classroom practice.

== Academics ==
The curriculum includes reading, writing, math, science, technology, history, art, physical education, Spanish and Latin. All AIM seniors take two courses for college credit at partnership universities in the greater Philadelphia area including Drexel's Close School of Entrepreneurship, Cabrini and University of the Arts. AIM also provides Middle School students with a class in biking through the Outride Riding for Focus program.

== Accreditations and associations ==
AIM is a member of the National Association of Independent Schools (NAIS), The Pennsylvania Association of Independent Schools (PAIS), The Association of Delaware Valley Independent Schools (ADVIS), AIM is a Wilson Accredited Partner and two of its AIM Pathways teacher training courses are accredited by the IDA (International Dyslexia Association) as Center for Effective Reading Instruction certified teacher training.

== Athletics ==
AIM Academy has teams for basketball, soccer, cross country, golf, lacrosse, tennis, and mountain biking and competes in the Penn-Jersey League.
