= Main Street station (SEPTA) =

Railway station in Norristown, Pennsylvania

Main Street
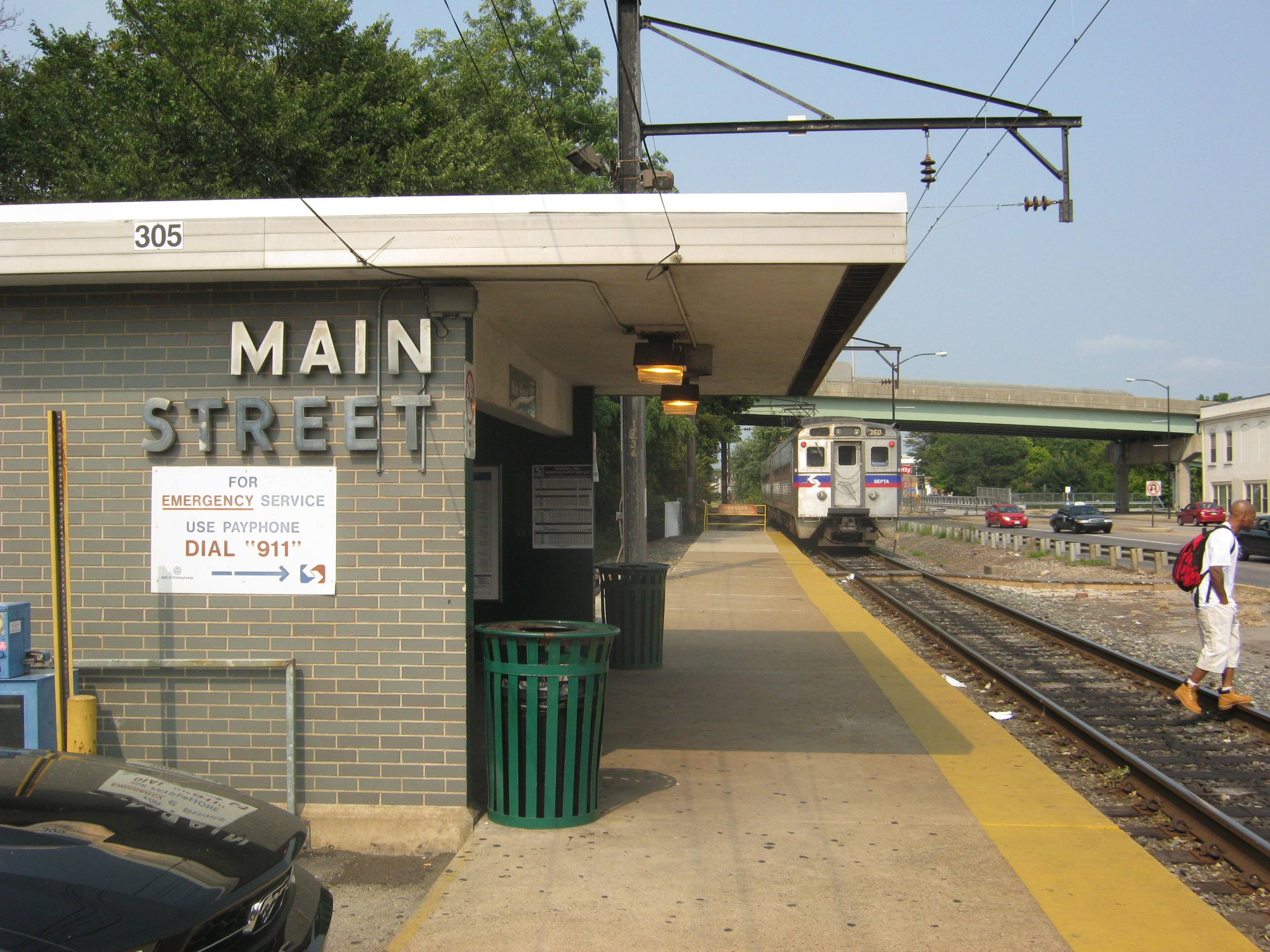

General information
- Location: 305 West Main Street; Norristown, Pennsylvania
- Coordinates: 40.1170°N 75.3488°W
- Owner: SEPTA
- Line: Norristown Branch
- Platforms: 1 side platform
- Tracks: 1
- Connections: SEPTA Suburban Bus: 90, 91, 93, 131

Construction
- Parking: 92 spaces
- Accessible: No

Other information
- Fare zone: 3

History
- Opened: December 30, 1873

Services
Preceding station	SEPTA	Following station
Norristown–Elm Street Terminus	Manayunk/Norristown Line	Norristown toward Penn Medicine Station
Former services
Preceding station	Lehigh Valley Transit Company	Following station
Elm Street via Rink station toward Allentown	Liberty Bell High Speed Line Until 1951	Lafayette Street toward 69th Street
Preceding station	Reading Railroad	Following station
Elm Street Terminus	Norristown Branch	Norristown toward Philadelphia
Location

Main Street station is a SEPTA Regional Rail station in Norristown, Pennsylvania, United States. It serves the Manayunk/Norristown Line. It is one of the two stations on the short electrified branch to Elm Street in Norristown. The station has 76 parking spaces. It is located at Main and Markley Streets. In FY 2013, Main Street station had a weekday average of 189 boardings and 181 alightings.

== History ==
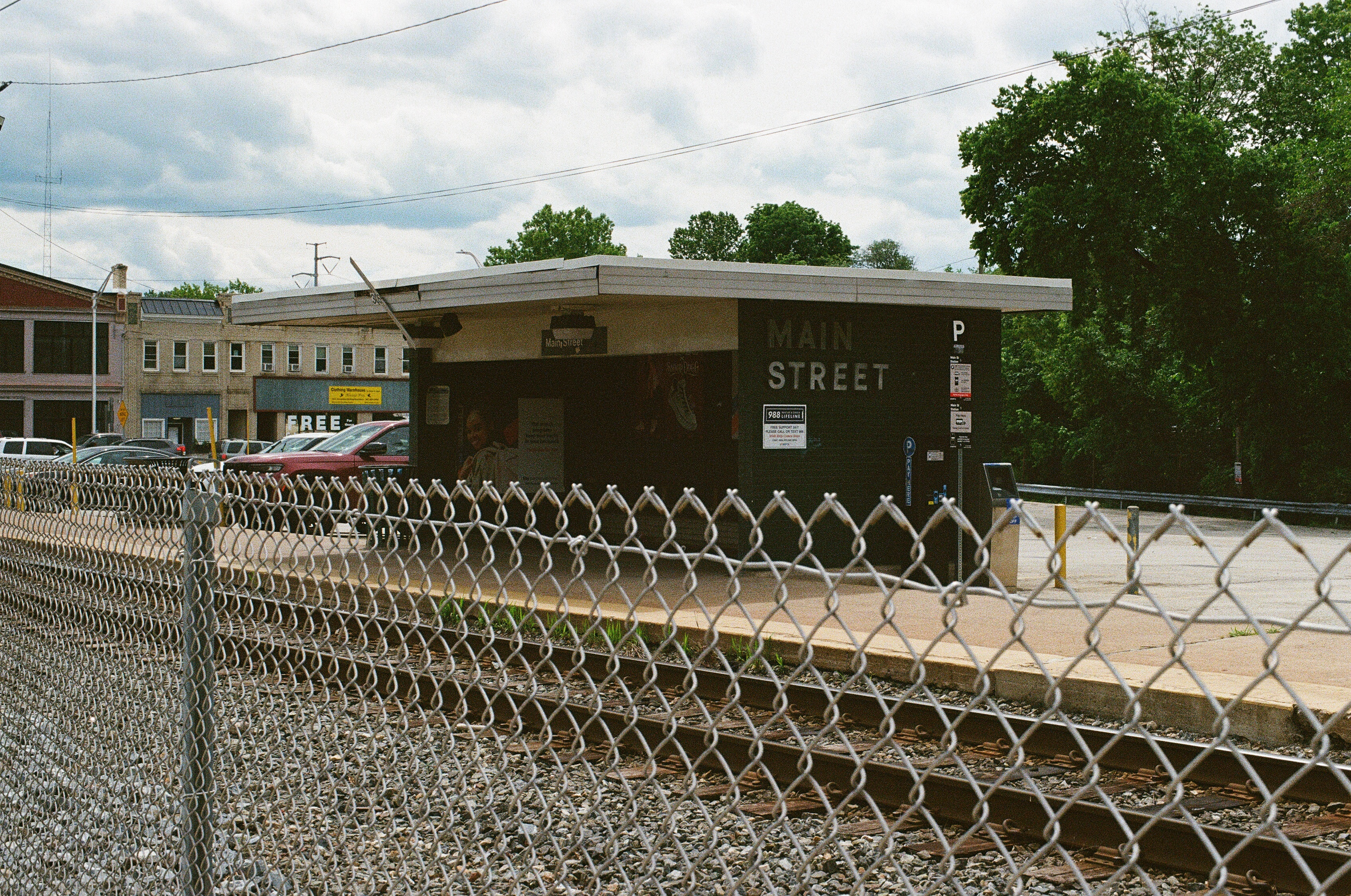
The station in Summer 2025

The Stony Creek Railroad completed the Stony Creek Branch from Lansdale to Norristown on December 30, 1873. Its Norristown depot was located at Main and Markley. The connection south to the Norristown Branch opened in 1880. Main Street was also the last Lehigh Valley Transit Company stop on the Liberty Bell Limited (also known as the Liberty Bell High Speed Line) from Allentown to Philadelphia, turning onto Mount Airy Street going towards what is now the Norristown Transportation Center (formerly the Lafayette Street station) and formerly connected with the Norristown High Speed Line.
