= Spring Mill, Pennsylvania =

Unincorporated community in Pennsylvania, US

- Unincorporated community
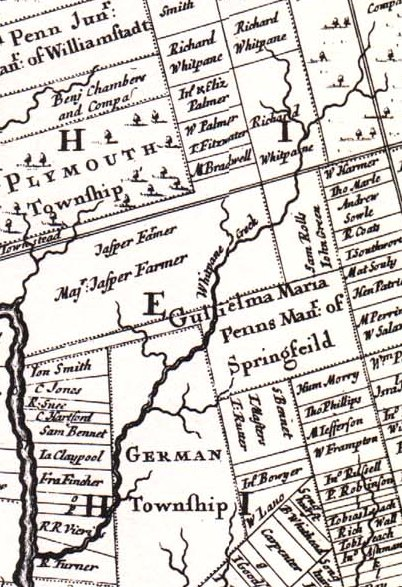
- Detail of Thomas Holme's 1687 map of Pennsylvania. Spring Mill is located along the left border, above the bend in the Schuylkill River.

- Location within the state of Pennsylvania Spring Mill, Pennsylvania (the United States)
- Coordinates: 40°04′29.784″N 75°17′6.97″W
- Country: United States of America
- State: Pennsylvania
- County: Montgomery
- Township: Whitemarsh
- Time zone: UTC-5 (EST)
  - Summer (DST): UTC-4 (EDT)
- ZIP codes: 19428
- Area code: 610

Spring Mill is an unincorporated community in Whitemarsh Township, Montgomery County, Pennsylvania, United States.

Located along the Schuylkill River, it lies between the community of Miquon and the Borough of Conshohocken. Conshohocken's southeastern border cuts diagonally across the street grid – from 12th Avenue, south of Righter Street, to approximately where Cherry Street meets the river.

"Spring Mill" was first a gristmill, built sometime between 1697 and 1704. The mill lent its name to Spring Mill Creek and the surrounding area. The mill burned in 1967, and its stone ruins were demolished. The miller's house survives, and is listed on the National Register of Historic Places.

Spring Mill Station was established by the Reading Railroad circa 1880. The modern station is part of the SEPTA Manayunk/Norristown Line. Located along the river at North Lane, it is subject to periodic flooding.

The Schuylkill River Trail passes through the community. Spring Mill shares Conshohocken's 19428 zip code.

Spring Mill until recently was the most populous village in the township, but owing to the demolition of its furnaces and several manufacturing establishments, its prosperity has been impaired. It is situated on the east side of the Schuylkill, with two railroads having double tracks passing through it from Philadelphia. It contains at present four stores, one hotel, two clay-works, a grist-mill, several mechanic shops and about fifty houses. The census of 1880 gives seven hundred and eighty-eight inhabitants; if this is no typographical error, it is entirely too high; the number of houses will not admit of half this population. Mr. Hitner has sold his two furnaces here to the Schuylkill Valley Railroad Company to give them room for improvements. The village received its name from several copious springs of water near by, the principal ones being five or six in number. They are all situated within an area of half an acre, and flow into one stream, which after a course of a quarter of a mile, empties into the Schuylkill. In this distance it has sufficient power to propel the whole year round the grist-mill mentioned, which was built here before 1715, and then owned by David Williams, next by Robert Jones. Thomas Livezey, in January 1812, advertised it for rent, stating that it was affected by "neither frost nor drought." Mr. Hitner's furnaces were erected here in 1844 and 1853, with an estimated capacity to produce annually twelve thousand tons of iron. John Meconkey advertised the tavern and ferry here for sale in December 1803, stating that the house was thirty-five by eighteen feet, two stories high, with an ice-house attached, and that the ferry had the advantage of not being fordable at any time of the year. Edge Hill crosses the Schuylkill just below the village, and continues up the other side of the river to West Conshohocken, where it turns to the southwest. The river is quite narrow where it flows through the hill and rises on both sides to an elevation of upwards of two hundred and fifty feet, contributing to the beauty of the scenery. Its flourishing neighbor, Conshohocken, bids fair to absorb the entire place, it being no easy matter now to a stranger to tell where the one begins and the other ends. The post-office here is called William Penn, and was established before 1876. — History of Montgomery County (1884).

== Landmarks ==
- "Mount Joy," Peter Legaux Mansion (c.1735), northeastern corner of East Hector Street and North Lane. NRHP-listed. Built by the third owner of the gristmill.
- Miller's House at Spring Mill (c.1770), North Lane, south of East Hector Street. NRHP-listed. The now-demolished gristmill stood east of the house, along Spring Mill Creek.
- Spring Mill Café, 164 Barren Hill Road. Housed in an 1831 former general store.
- Lee Tire and Rubber Company (1909), 1100 East Hector Street. NRHP-listed. Now the Spring Mill Corporate Center.
- Spring Mill Fire Company #1, 1210 East Hector Street.
- Spring Mill County Park, south side of East Hector Street, between North Lane and Barren Hill Road.
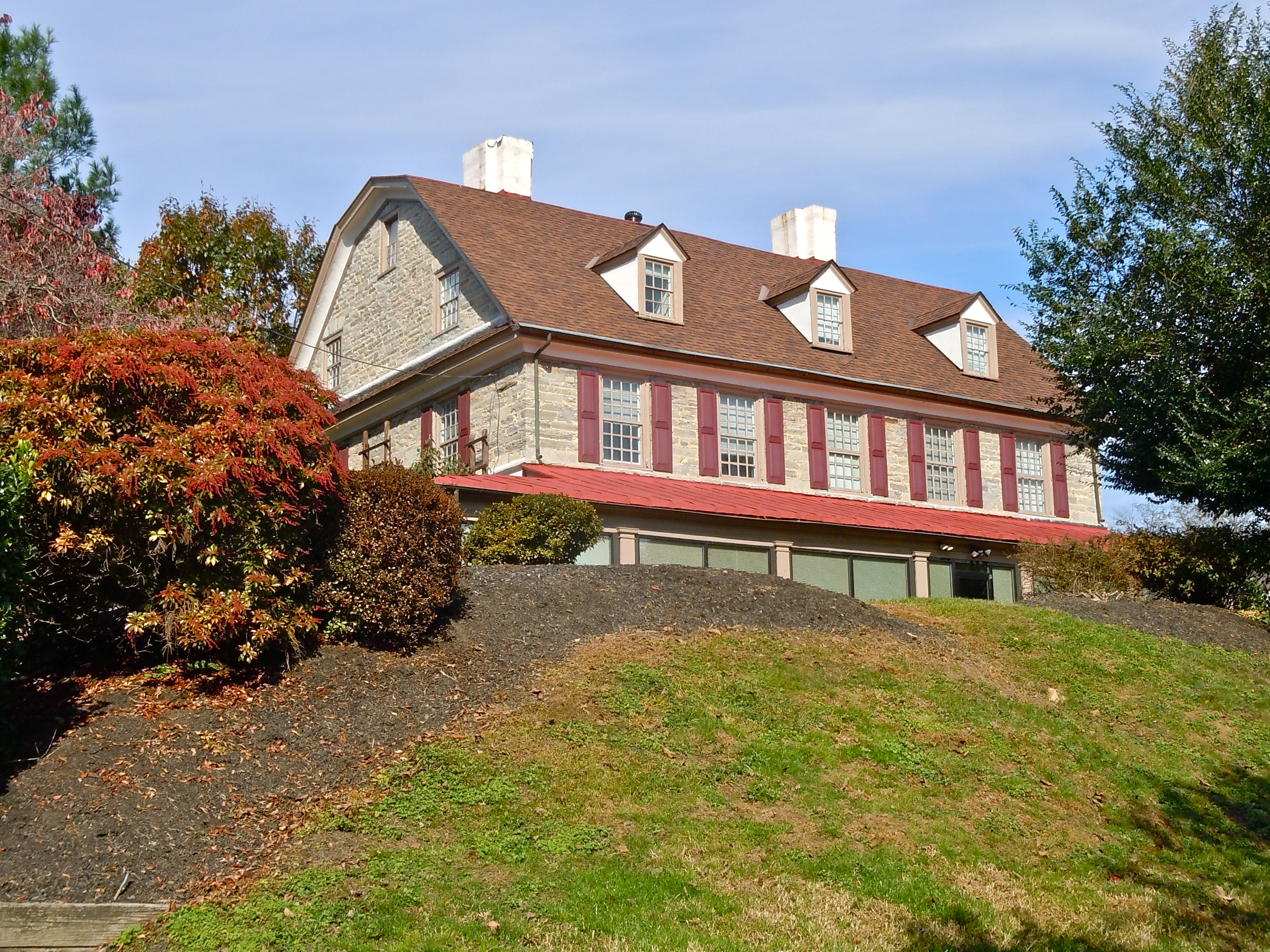
"Mount Joy," Peter Legaux Mansion (c. 1735).

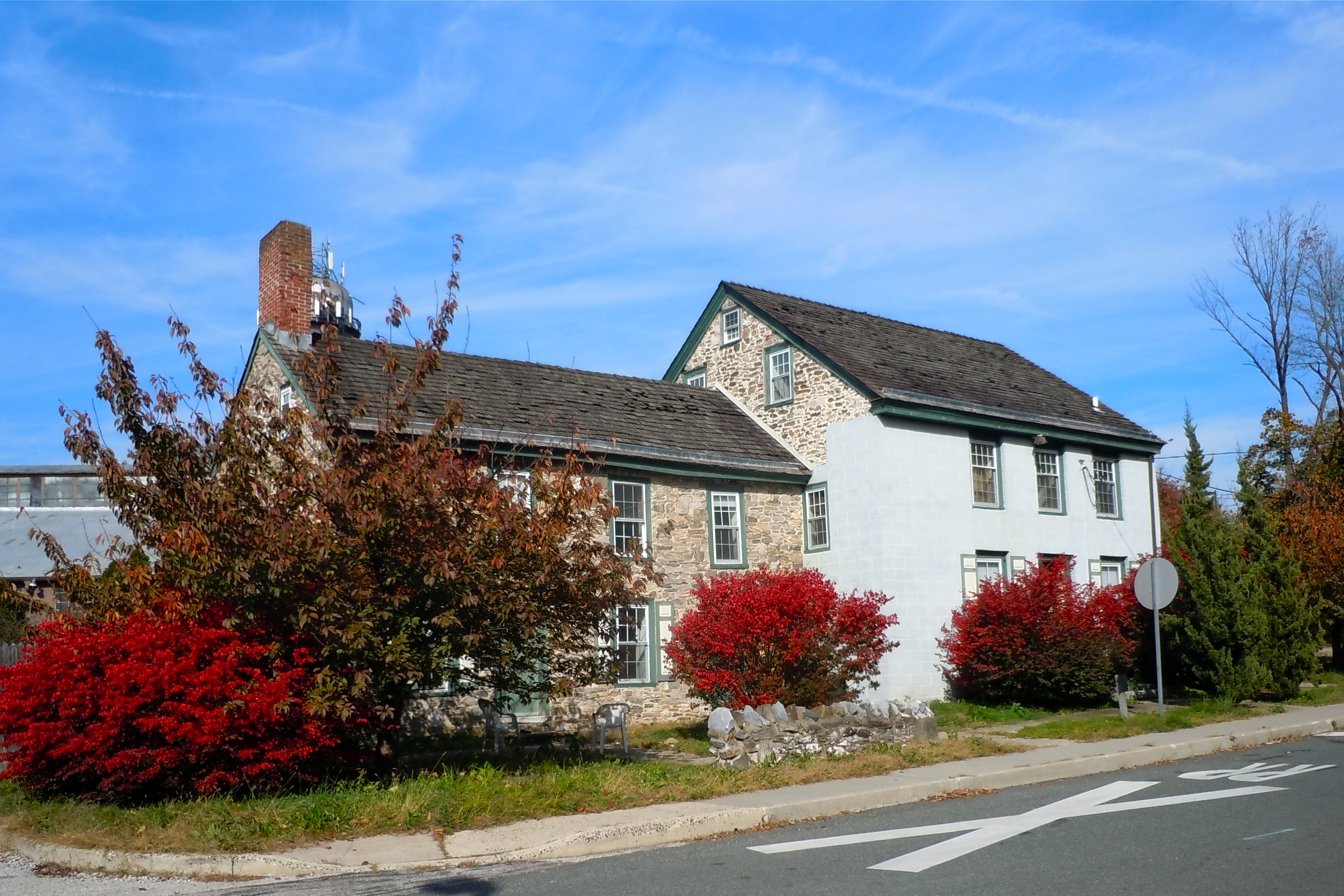
Miller's House at Spring Mill (c. 1770).

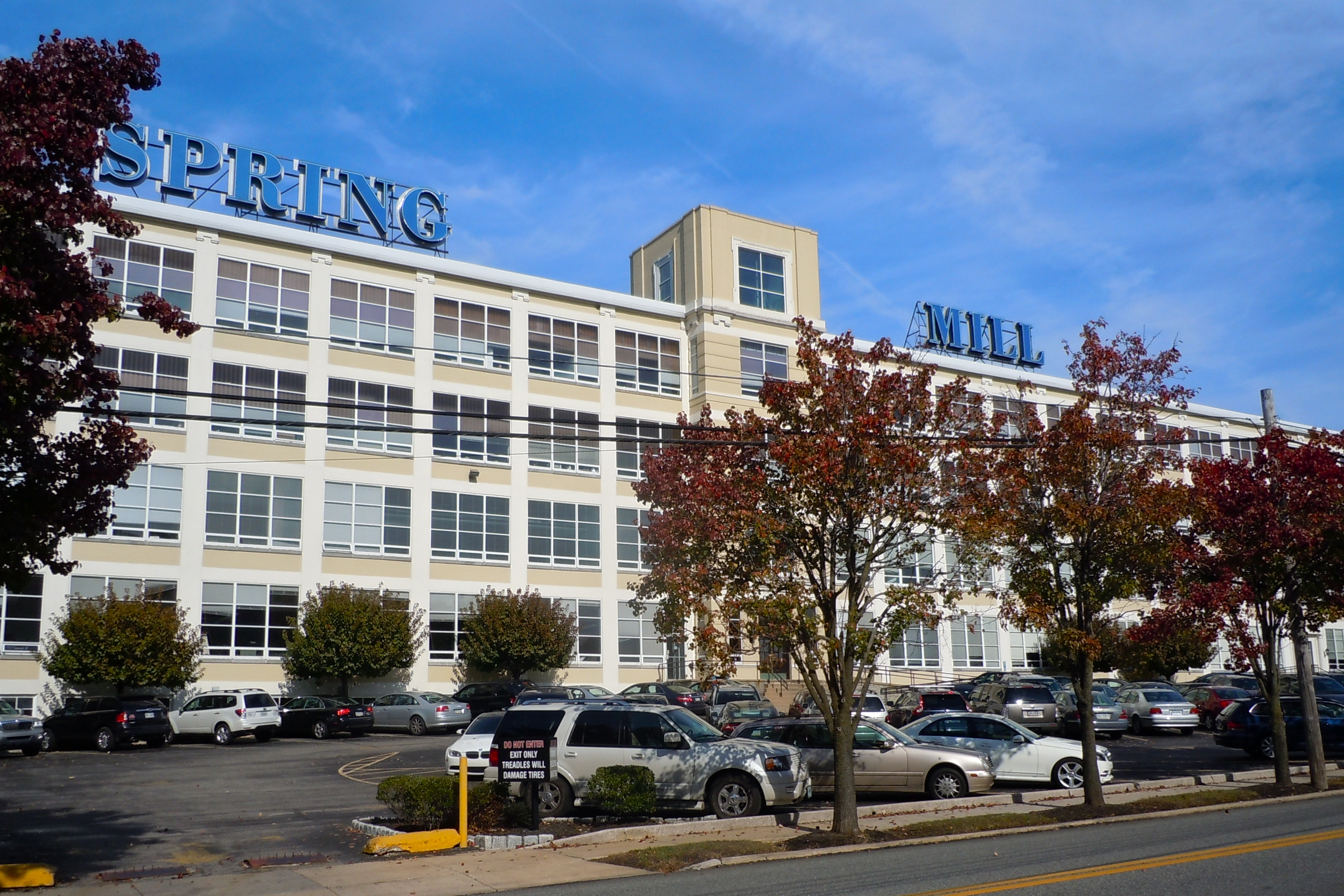
Lee Tire and Rubber Company (1909). Now the Spring Mill Corporate Center.

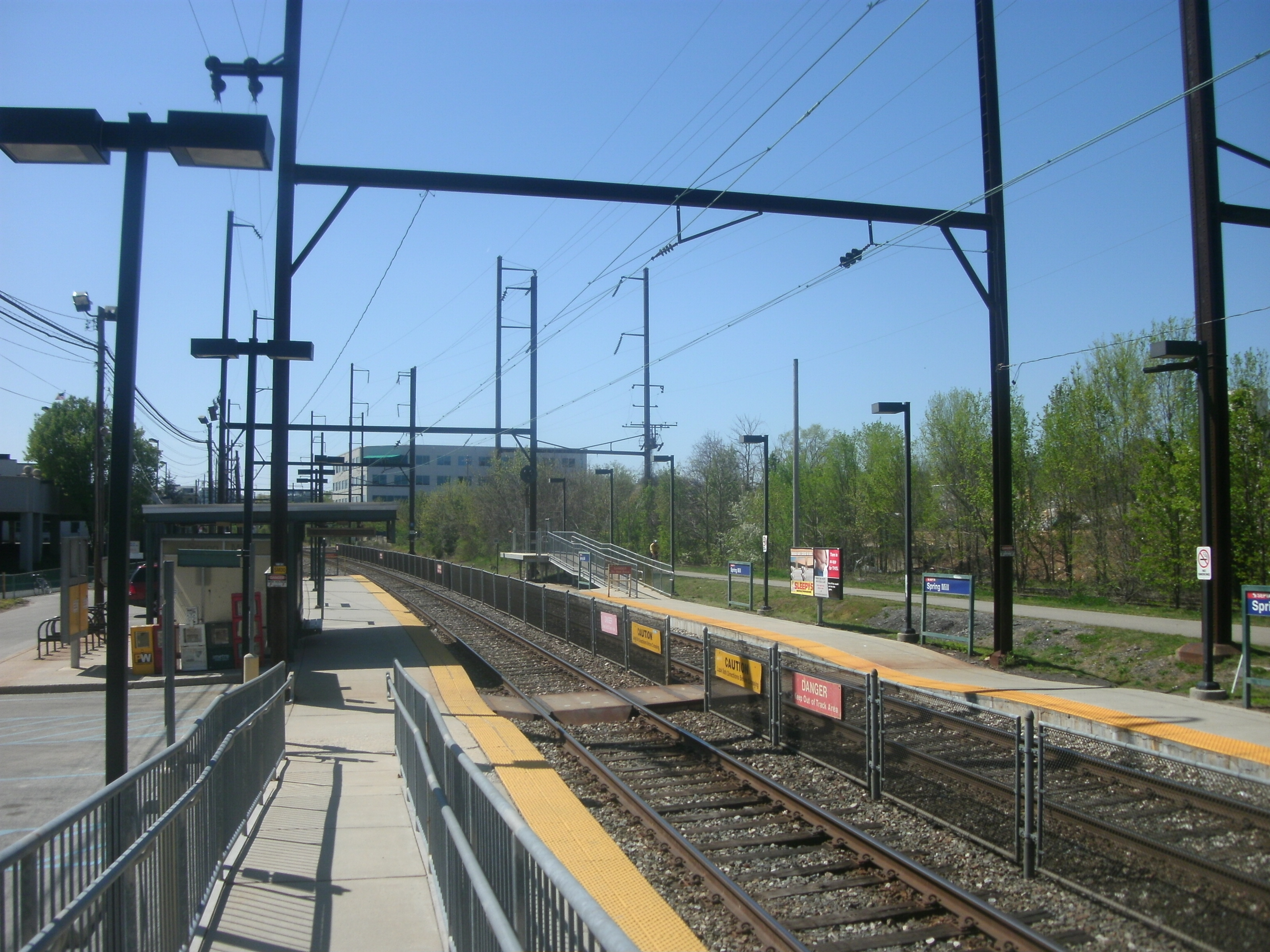
Spring Mill Station.
