= Miller's House at Spring Mill =

Historic house in Pennsylvania, United States

- U.S. National Register of Historic Places
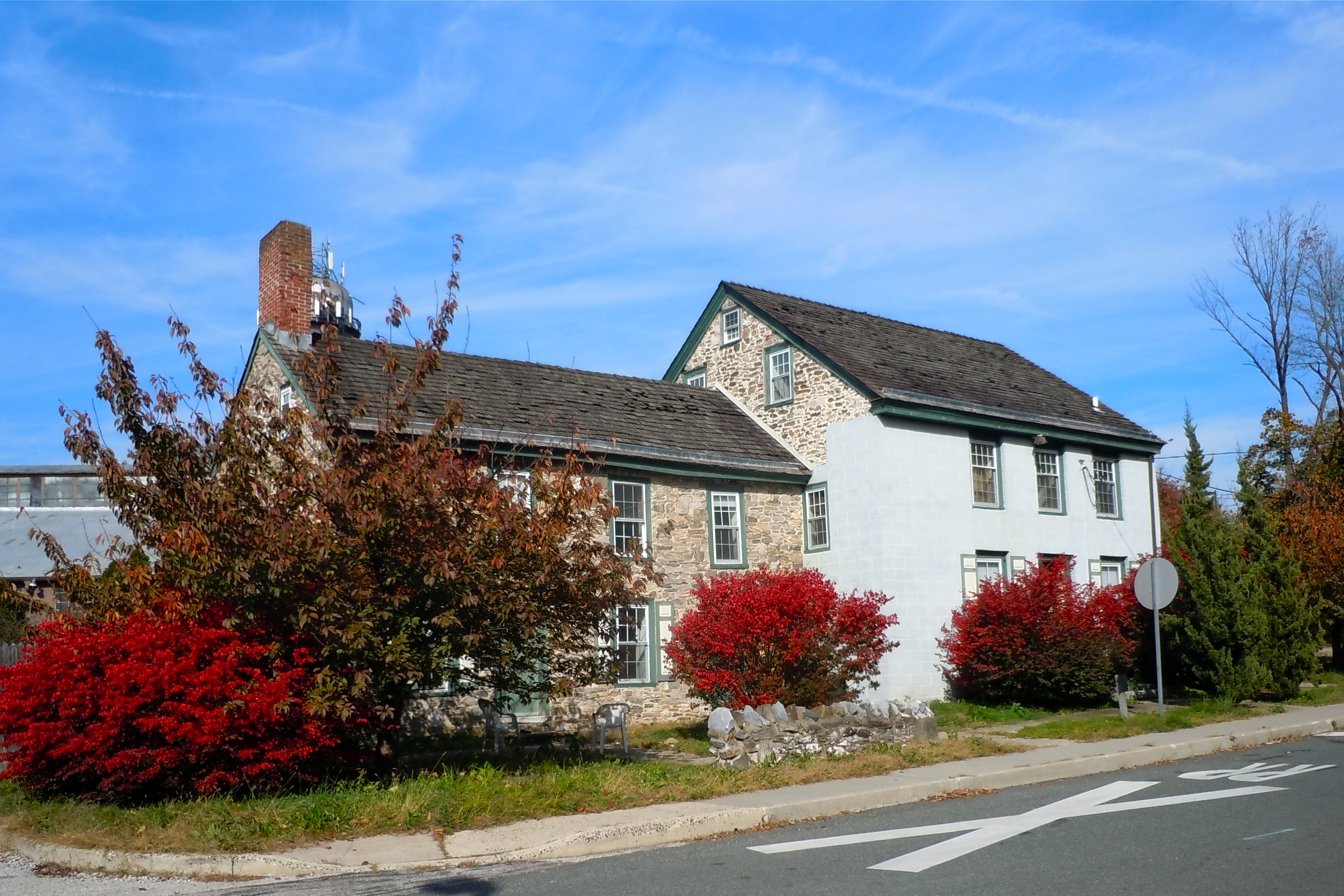
- Miller's House at Spring Mill, November 2011

- Location within Pennsylvania Location within the United States
- Location: North Lane and Hector Street, Whitemarsh, Pennsylvania
- Coordinates: 40°4′29.784″N 75°17′6.97″W
- Area: 0.4 acres (0.16 ha)
- Built: c. 1770, c. 1820
- Architectural style: Colonial, Georgian
- NRHP reference No.: 89002281
- Added to NRHP: January 4, 1990

The Miller's House at Spring Mill is an historic building in the Spring Mill section of Whitemarsh, Montgomery County, Pennsylvania, United States. Located roughly two hundred feet (61 m) from where Spring Mill Creek empties into the Schuylkill River, it is situated approximately a one-quarter mile (400 m) southeast of the Borough of Conshohocken.

The house was added to the National Register of Historic Places in 1989.

== History and architectural features ==
This historic house was built circa 1770, with an addition built sometime around 1820. It has a 2½-story, three-bay, stuccoed, gneiss-stone, main section with a gable roof and a four-bay vernacular-stone addition. This Colonial-era house features vernacular, Georgian-style architectural details. It was built as the residence for the miller/owner of the formerly-adjacent gristmill.

"Spring Mill" was in operation by 1704, and gave its name to the creek and the surrounding area. It stood on the opposite side of North Lane from the house, along Spring Mill Creek. It was destroyed by fire in 1967.

The current resident is "The Tricycle Café & Bike Shop"., a bicycle and coffee shop.
