= Spring Mills =

Spring Mills may refer to:

- Spring Mills, New Jersey, an unincorporated community in Hunterdon County, New Jersey
- Dawlis Mill–Spring Mills Historic District, listed on the NRHP in Hunterdon County, New Jersey
- Spring Mills, New York, a hamlet in SE Independence, New York
- Spring Mills, Pennsylvania, a census-designated place in Centre County, Pennsylvania
- Spring Mills, Virginia, an unincorporated community in Appomattox County, Virginia
- Spring Mills, West Virginia, an unincorporated community in Berkeley County, West Virginia
  - Spring Mills Historic District, a national historic district located in Berkeley County, West Virginia

== See also ==
- Spring Mill (disambiguation)
- Springs Global, parent of the former Springs Mills, Inc.
- Springs Mills Building, a 21-story office tower located in Manhattan, New York City
