= Manayunk/Norristown Line =

SEPTA Regional Rail line

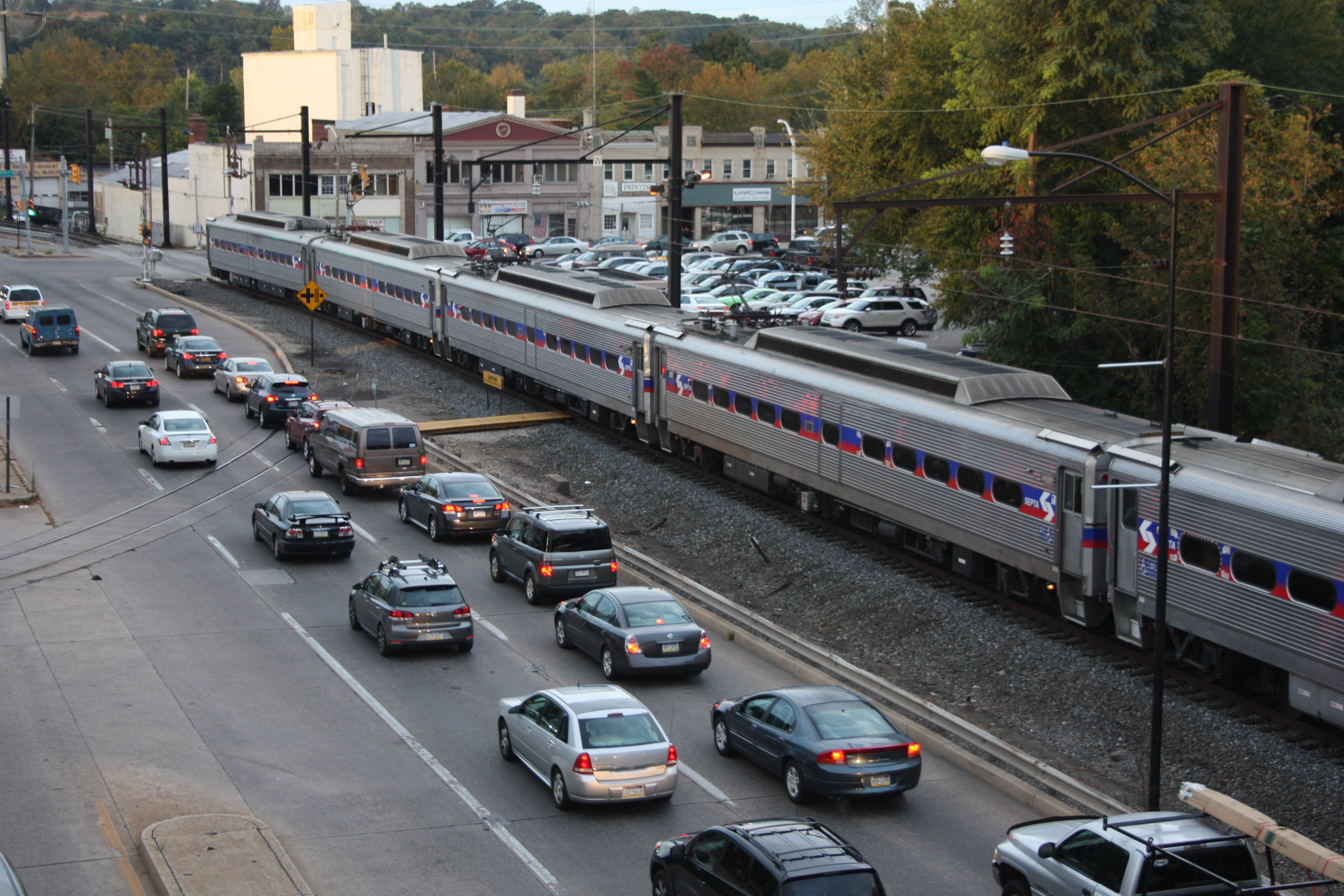
- A Manayunk/Norristown train at Main Street station in Norristown, Pennsylvania

Overview
- Service type: SEPTA Regional Rail commuter service
- Current operator: SEPTA
- Ridership: 8,770 (FY 2025)

Route
- Termini: Penn Medicine Station; Norristown–Elm Street
- Stops: 17
- Distance travelled: 18.1 mi (29.1 km)
- Lines used: Norristown Branch; SEPTA Main Line; West Chester Branch

Technical
- Rolling stock: Electric multiple units
- Electrification: Overhead line, 12 kV 25 Hz AC

The Manayunk/Norristown Line is a commuter rail service in Southeastern Pennsylvania between Center City Philadelphia and Norristown, and one of the 13 lines in SEPTA's Regional Rail network. In FY 2024, it had the highest operating ratio (27%) on the SEPTA Regional Rail network.

== Route ==
Manayunk/Norristown Line trains originate at and take the West Chester Branch to reach 30th Street Station. From there, they use the Center City Commuter Connection of the SEPTA Main Line, making all stops between 30th Street Station and North Broad station. From North Broad, trains use the Norristown Branch, traveling along the east bank of the Schuylkill River through Philadelphia's East Falls and Manayunk neighborhoods and Conshohocken before reaching Norristown. At the Norristown Transportation Center, commuters can transfer to SEPTA surface buses or the Norristown High Speed Line to 69th Street Transportation Center. From the Norristown Transportation Center, trains run along the west side of Markley Street (US 202) to Norristown–Main Street and Norristown–Elm Street. Until 1981, additional passenger service continued from Norristown over the former Reading main line to Pottstown, Reading, and Pottsville.

As of July 2026, most weekday Manayunk/Norristown Line trains terminate at 30th Street Station with limited trains continuing along the Wilmington/Newark Line or the Media/Wawa Line. All weekend Manayunk/Norristown Line trains continue to the Airport Terminal stations on the Airport Line.

== History ==

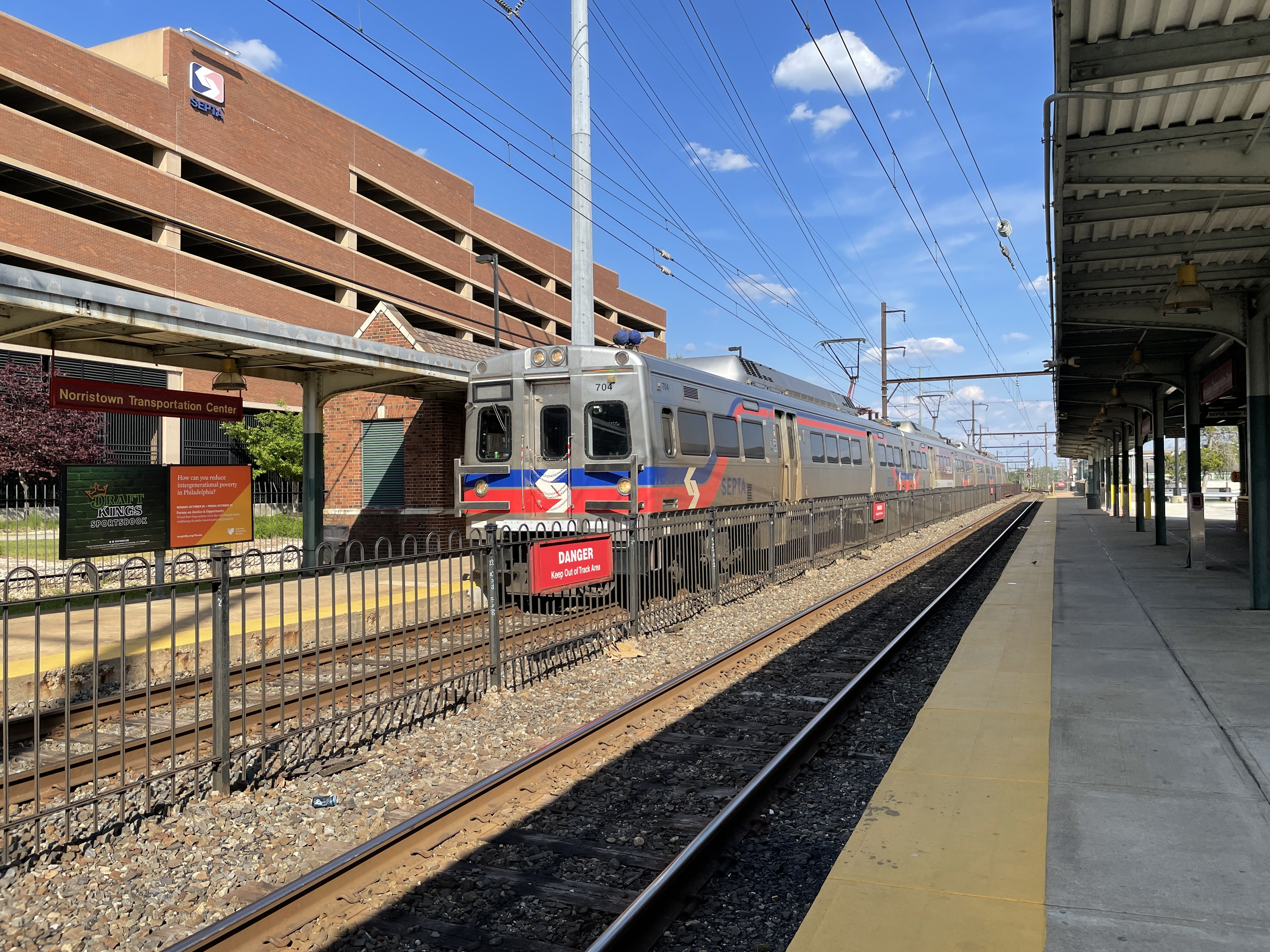
An outbound Manayunk/Norristown Line train at Norristown Transportation Center

The Manayunk/Norristown Line is a continuation of the Reading Company's suburban services on the Norristown Branch from Philadelphia to Norristown, Pennsylvania. Electrified service to Norristown and Chestnut Hill East began on February 5, 1933. Steam (and later diesel)-operated intercity services continued to operate beyond Norristown. By the 1960s Budd Rail Diesel Cars handled most of the Reading's diesel services, although the Reading's EMD FP7 locomotives, displaced from the Crusader, saw regular use on the Philadelphia–Reading run. SEPTA discontinued services beyond Norristown on July 26, 1981.

Between 1984 and 2010 the route was designated R6 Norristown as part of SEPTA's diametrical reorganization of its lines. Manayunk/Norristown Line trains operated through the city center to the Ivy Ridge Line (later Cynwyd) on the ex-Pennsylvania side of the system. The R-number naming system was dropped on July 25, 2010. SEPTA undertook a series of operational and physical improvements of the Norristown Branch beginning in 2013, culminating in the activation of positive train control on August 15, 2016.

On April 9, 2020, service on the line was suspended due to the COVID-19 pandemic, though Temple University and North Broad stations were still being served by other rail services. Service resumed on June 28, 2020. On September 1–2, 2021, the remnants of Hurricane Ida caused severe flooding along the Schuylkill River, with the Manayunk/Norristown Line between Miquon and Norristown flooded and damaged. As a result, service along the line was suspended. Service between Center City Philadelphia and Spring Mill resumed on September 7 while service along the entire length of the line to Norristown resumed on September 13.

=== Proposed extensions beyond Norristown ===
Like the Cynwyd Line, the Manayunk/Norristown Line was slated to become part of the planned new Schuylkill Valley Metro, but was to serve the King of Prussia Mall complex and the former Pennsylvania Railroad's Trenton Cut-Off line to Frazer. This was referred to by planners as the "Cross-County Segment." An extension of the Manayunk/Norristown Line, called the Norristown Extension, to Wyomissing was later proposed, with funding to come through new tolls on U.S. Route 422.

As of mid-2018, the borough of Phoenixville is studying the restoration of SEPTA train service by extending the Manayunk/Norristown Line using old Reading Line track past Norristown, currently used for freight trains by Norfolk Southern along its Harrisburg Line. In 2018, a panel led by the Greater Reading Chamber Alliance pushed for an extension of the Manayunk/Norristown Line to Reading, with service terminating either at the Franklin Street Station in Reading or in Wyomissing. The proposed extension would utilize existing Norfolk Southern freight railroad tracks. Before service can be implemented, a study would need to take place.

In 2020, the Pennsylvania Department of Transportation (PennDOT) finalized a study on the feasibility of extending passenger train service from Norristown to Reading along the Norfolk Southern freight line. The proposed extension is projected to cost $818 million, which includes buying the trains and paying Norfolk Southern to use the line. The service is projected to have an annual operating cost of between $18 million and $25 million. Stations will be located in Reading (Franklin Street Station), Birdsboro, Pottstown, Royersford, Phoenixville, Valley Forge, and Norristown (Norristown Transportation Center); from where the train will follow the existing Manayunk/Norristown Line to Philadelphia. As the section between Reading and Norristown is not electrified, the service will either require dual mode locomotives or the extension of electrification beyond Norristown in order to provide a one-seat ride between Reading and Philadelphia; another option would be to operate diesel-powered trains between Reading and Norristown that would offer a transfer to electric-powered trains at Norristown for service to Philadelphia. In addition, a third track would need to be constructed between Reading and Norristown in order to accommodate both passenger service and Norfolk Southern freight trains. The proposal calls for between 6 and 9 daily round trips to Reading and has a projected weekday ridership between 3,400 and 6,400 by 2030. Following the PennDOT feasibility study, a feasibility study by Norfolk Southern needs to be conducted and the proposal needs to be added to the PennDOT rail plan, which would allow for Federal Railroad Administration grants to be used for studies of the proposed service.

As part of the process of implementing passenger train service from Norristown to Reading, county commissioners from Berks, Chester, and Montgomery counties will create the Tri-County Passenger Rail Committee, which will consist of three members named by each county.

Rail service between Reading and Philadelphia along the Norfolk Southern line is included in Amtrak's service vision for 2035.

== Stations ==
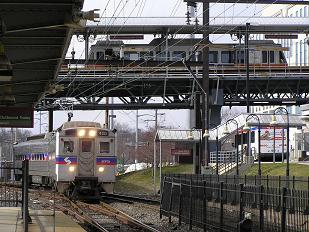
The Norristown Transportation Center is a major hub

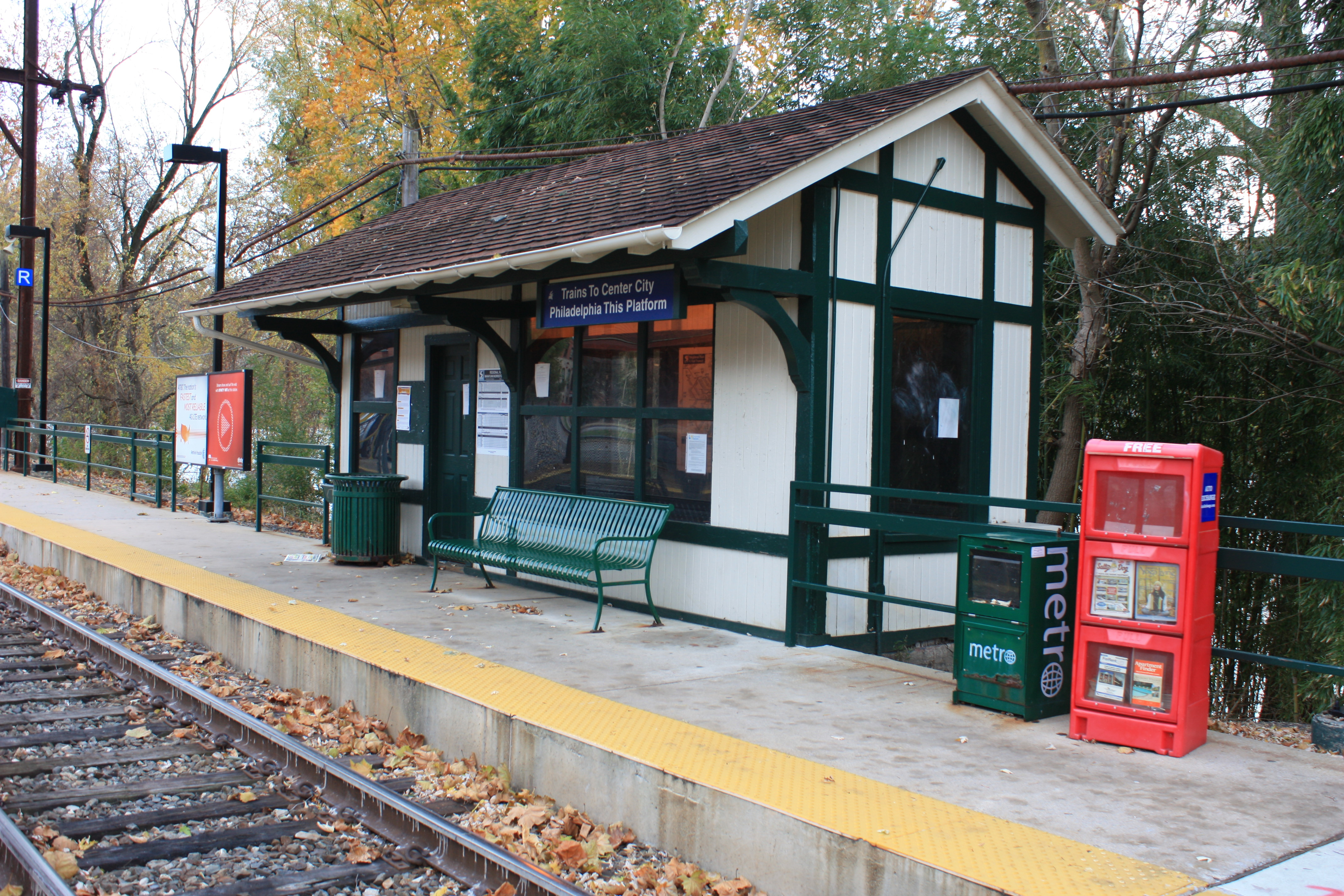
Miquon station

The Manayunk/Norristown Line makes the following station stops after leaving the Center City Commuter Connection; stations indicated with a gray background are closed.

Zone	Location	Station	Miles (km) from Center City	Opened	Closed	Connections / notes
C	Callowhill, Philadelphia	Spring Garden Street			November 6, 1984	Located on the former line to Reading Terminal.
C	Temple University	Temple University	2.1 (3.4)			SEPTA Regional Rail: all lines
1	Glenwood, Philadelphia	North Broad	2.9 (4.7)			SEPTA Regional Rail: SEPTA Metro: SEPTA City Bus: 4, 16, 54
1	Allegheny West, Philadelphia	Allegheny	4.0 (6.4)			SEPTA City Bus: 33, 60
1	East Falls, Philadelphia	East Falls	5.5 (8.9)			SEPTA City Bus: K
2	Wissahickon, Philadelphia	Wissahickon	6.4 (10.3)			SEPTA City Bus: 9, 27, 61, 65
2	Manayunk, Philadelphia	Manayunk	7.6 (12.2)			SEPTA City Bus: 61
2	Roxborough, Philadelphia	Ivy Ridge	8.4 (13.5)	August 25, 1986		SEPTA City Bus: 61
2	Roxborough, Philadelphia	Shawmont	9.4 (15.1)		November 10, 1996	
2	Miquon	Miquon	10.7 (17.2)			
3	Conshohocken	Spring Mill	12.3 (19.8)			
3	Conshohocken	Conshohocken	13.5 (21.7)			SEPTA Suburban Bus: 95, 97
3	Conshohocken	Ivy Rock	15.3 (24.6)		1978	
3	Conshohocken	Mogees	15.9 (25.6)		October 4, 1992	
3	Norristown	Norristown T.C.	17.2 (27.7)			SEPTA Metro: SEPTA Suburban Bus: 90, 91, 93, 96, 97, 98, 99, 131
3	Norristown	Norristown–Main Street	17.7 (28.5)			SEPTA Suburban Bus: 90, 91, 93, 131
3	Norristown	Marshall Street	17.9 (28.8)		1959	
3	Norristown	Norristown–Elm Street	18.1 (29.1)			

=== Former diesel service ===
Prior to July 26, 1981, RDC diesel trains operated north of Norristown to Reading and Pottsville. Until 2011, SEPTA had considered restoring service as far as Reading as part of the Schuylkill Valley Metro project. These plans are currently on hold. The following is a list of stations formerly served by SEPTA.

Zone	Station	Miles (km) from Reading Terminal	Date opened	Date closed
4	Valley Forge Park			
4	Valley Forge	21.5 (34.6)		
5	Phoenixville	27.7 (44.6)		
5	Royersford	32.0 (51.5)		
5	Linfield	34.7 (55.8)		March 26, 1978
6	Pottstown	39.1 (62.9)		
7	Birdsboro	49.5 (79.7)		
8	Reading (Franklin Street)	58.1 (93.5)		
8	Leesport	66.3 (106.7)		
8	Mohrsville	68.6 (110.4)		
8	Shoemakersville	70.0 (112.7)		
8	Hamburg	75.3 (121.2)		
9	Auburn	83.5 (134.4)		
10	Schuylkill Haven	89.1 (143.4)		
10	Pottsville	93.6 (150.6)		

== Ridership ==
Between FY 2013–FY 2019 yearly ridership on the Manayunk/Norristown Line ranged between 2.9 million–3.3 million before collapsing during the COVID-19 pandemic. (Note: Data for individual lines is not available for FY 2020.)
