= Elm Street station =

SEPTA Regional Rail station

Elm Street
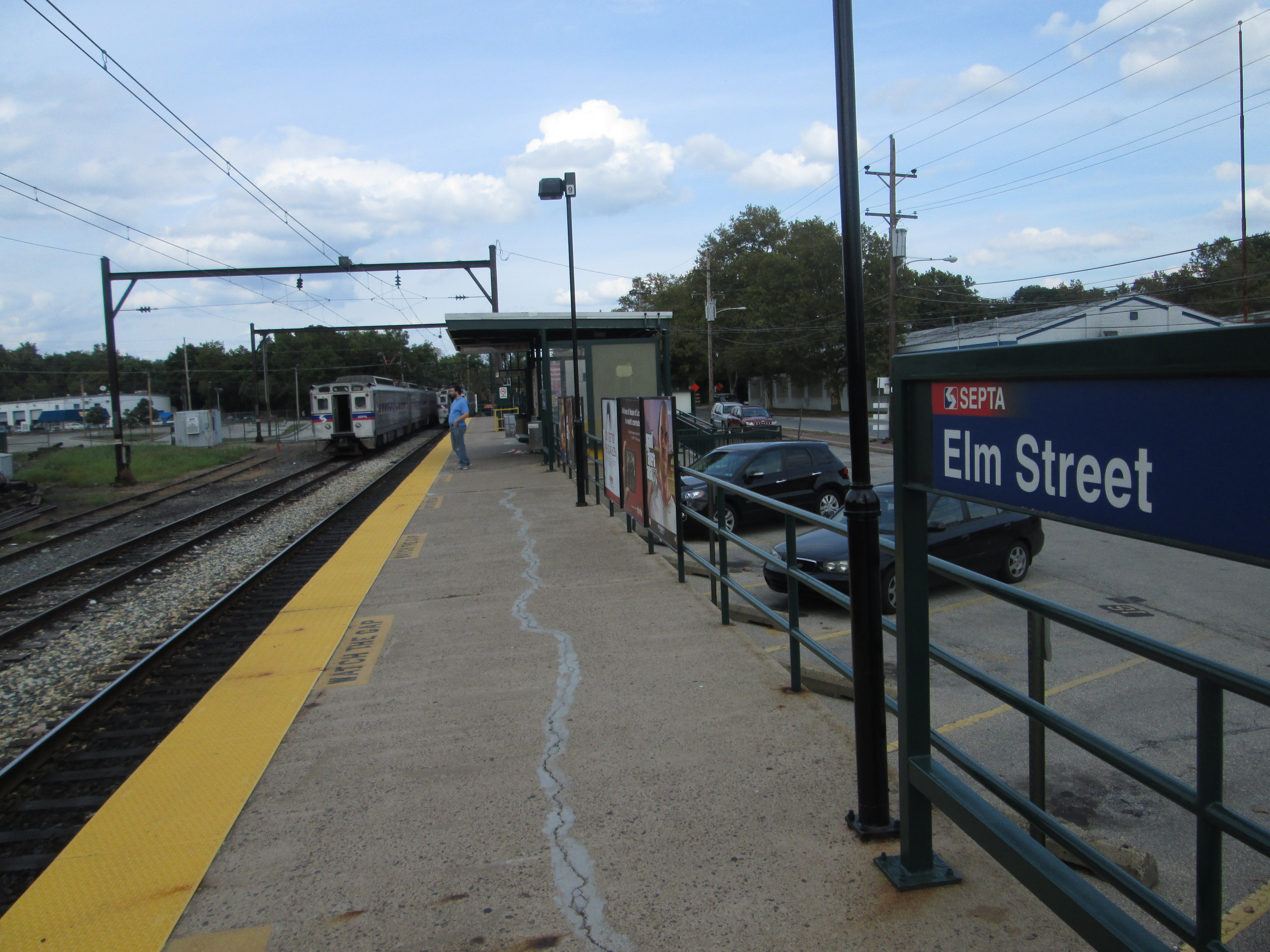
- The Elm Street station seen from the lone platform in September 2013. The yard at Elm Street is visible in the distance.

General information
- Location: 793 Markley Street, Norristown, Pennsylvania 19401
- Coordinates: 40.1227°N 75.3450°W
- Owner: SEPTA
- Line: Norristown Branch
- Platforms: 1 side platform
- Tracks: 2

Construction
- Parking: 246 spaces
- Accessible: Yes

Other information
- Fare zone: 3

Passengers
- 2017: 300 boardings 254 alightings (weekday average)
- Rank: 90 of 146

Services
Preceding station	SEPTA	Following station
Terminus	Manayunk/Norristown Line	Norristown–Main Street toward Penn Medicine Station
Former services
Preceding station	Lehigh Valley Transit Company	Following station
Lansdale via Washington Square, Acorn, and Broad Street stations toward Allentown	Liberty Bell High Speed Line Until 1951	Main Street toward 69th Street
Preceding station	Reading Railroad	Following station
Terminus	Norristown Branch	Main Street toward Philadelphia
Terminus	Stony Creek Branch	Hartranft toward Lansdale
Location

Elm Street station is a SEPTA Regional Rail station in Norristown, Pennsylvania. Located at Elm and Markley Streets, it is the last stop on the Norristown section of the Manayunk/Norristown Line. It is one of three stations in Norristown, the other two being Main Street and Norristown Transit Center. It includes a 219-space parking lot. In FY 2013, Elm Street station had a weekday average of 300 boardings and 257 alightings. The freight-only Stony Creek Branch passes the station to the west.

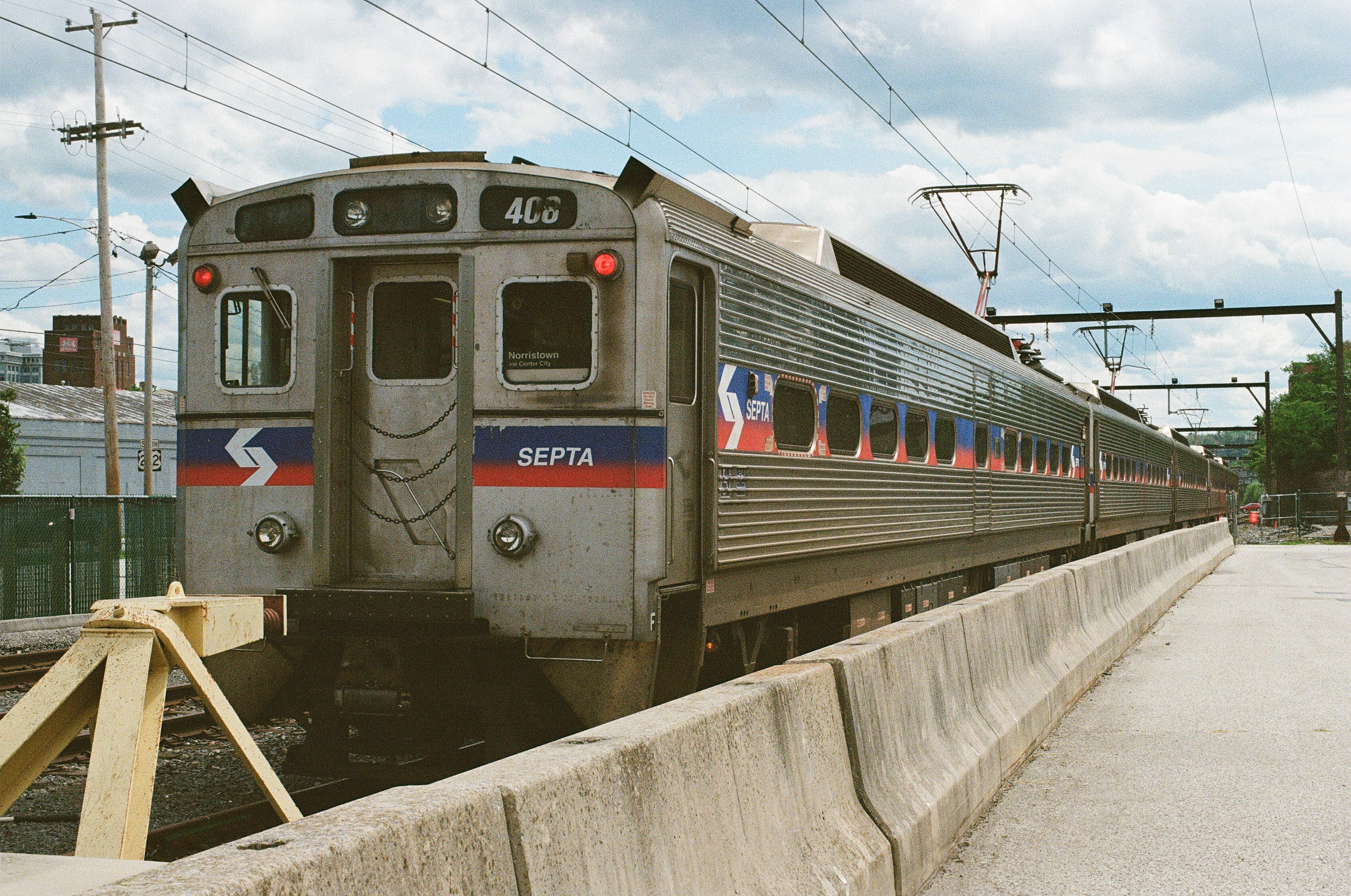
A Silverliner IV parked at Elm Street station
