= Norristown Branch =

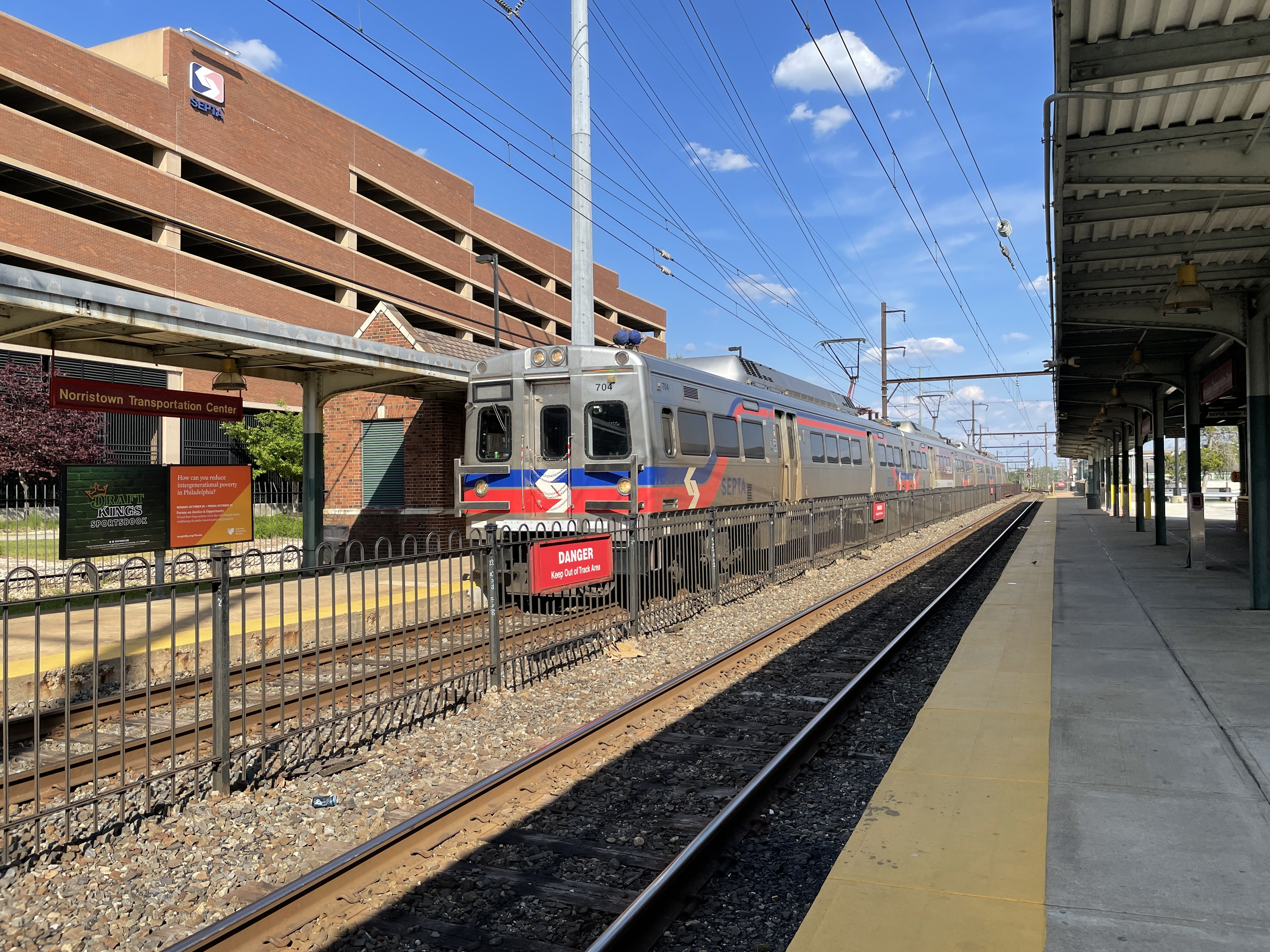
- An outbound Manayunk/Norristown Line train on the Norristown Branch at Norristown Transportation Center

Overview
- Owner: SEPTA

Service
- Services: Manayunk/Norristown Line

History
- Opened: 18 October 1834

Technical
- Line length: 14.6 mi (23.5 km)
- Track gauge: 1,435 mm (4 ft 8 1/2 in) standard gauge
- Electrification: 12 kV 25 Hz overhead catenary

The Norristown Branch is a railway line in Pennsylvania. It runs 14.6 miles (23.5 km) from a junction with the SEPTA Main Line in North Philadelphia to Norristown, Pennsylvania. It was originally built by the Philadelphia, Germantown and Norristown Railroad (PG&N) in 1834, and was a part of the Reading Company system from 1870 until 1976. Today it is owned by SEPTA and hosts the Manayunk/Norristown Line commuter rail service.

== History ==
The Philadelphia, Germantown and Norristown Railroad completed its initial line between Philadelphia and Germantown in 1832. The geography of the Wissahickon Creek frustrated plans to build directly from Germantown to Norristown, so the company built west from what is now 16th Street Junction in North Philadelphia. This line reached Manayunk on October 18, 1834, and Norristown on August 15, 1835. The line followed the east bank of the Schuylkill River and made no crossing of it.

The Philadelphia and Reading Railroad extended its main line down the west bank of the Schuylkill in 1838. The Reading served Bridgeport, across the Schuylkill from the PG&N's terminus at Norristown, but no physical connection existed. This was remedied in 1851 when the Swedes Ford Bridge Company, a lessee of the PG&N, constructed a railway and road bridge between the two locations. This allowed the two railroads to interchange traffic, and some passenger trains of the Reading began using the PG&N depot at Ninth Street and Green Street.

The Philadelphia and Reading Railroad leased the Philadelphia, Germantown and Norristown on December 1, 1870. The company continued to exist on paper, and remained the owner of the line between 16th Street Junction and Norristown, although control now rested with the Reading. The Stony Creek Railroad, controlled by the North Pennsylvania Railroad, had built south from Lansdale to Norristown, terminating at Main and Markley, the present site of Norristown–Main Street. This line opened in 1874. The Reading, through the Norristown Junction Railroad, built a connection between the two lines in 1880.

Another significant change came in 1903 and opening of a new bridge across the Schuylkill to replace the original connection at Swedes Ford. This new connecting line diverged from the Norristown Branch just west of the former PG&N station in Norristown, crossed Barbadoes Island, and made a connection with the Reading main line. The Reading electrified the branch from 16th Street Junction to Elm Street, on what had been part of the Stony Creek Railroad, in 1933. With the Reading Company's final bankruptcy in 1976, the Norristown Branch was conveyed to Conrail and then SEPTA.

Early in 2013, SEPTA began to undertake major operational improvements and physical rehabilitation on branch. Central to this project is the replacement of the 80-year-old wayside automatic block signal system with one that displays only in the operating cab, and operates in both directions on both tracks, thereby allowing greater operational flexibility. Two new remotely controlled interlockings are being constructed to facilitate bidirectional operation, one at Miquon, the other in Norristown between the main station and the Ford Street crossing. An electrified storage track is also being constructed at Miquon to allow for temporary turnback of trains at that station, as the line is periodically subjected to flooding from the Schuylkill River around Spring Mill and Conshohocken. Ongoing replacement of the line's overhead catenary, most of which is 80 years old, will continue along with the signal replacement. Also occurring in conjunction with these projects are the replacement of crossties, renewal of grade crossing surfaces, and trimming of brush and trees alongside the right-of-way. SEPTA activated PTC on the Norristown Branch on August 15, 2016.
