= Linfield station =

Former train station in Pennsylvania

Linfield
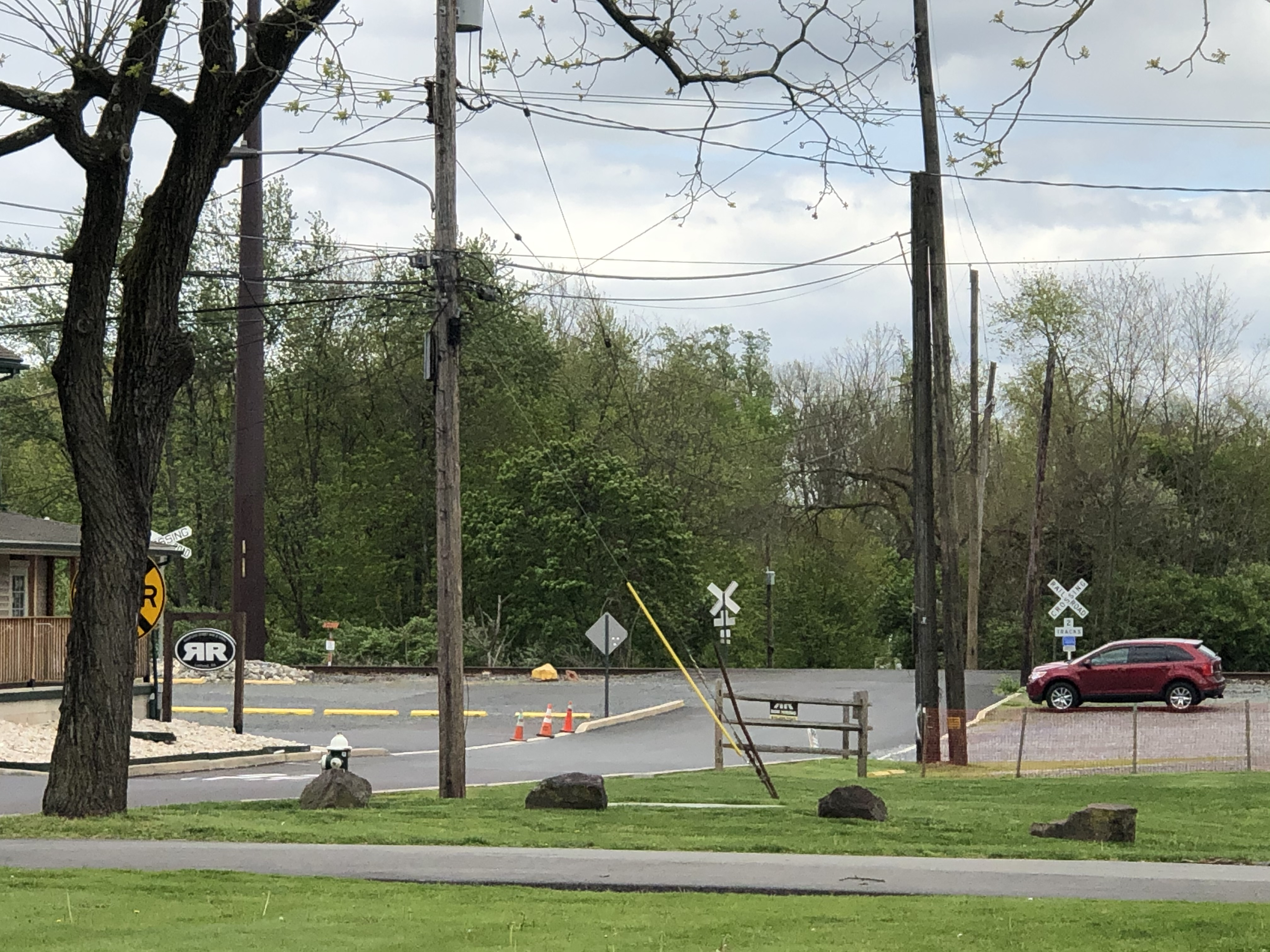
- Location of Linfield station

General information
- Coordinates: 40.210239°N 75.566285°W
- System: Former SEPTA regional rail station
- Platforms: 1 side platform
- Tracks: 2

Construction
- Accessible: No

History
- Opened: 1877
- Closed: March 26, 1978

Former services
Preceding station	SEPTA	Following station
Pottstown toward Pottsville	Pottsville Line	Royersford toward Reading Terminal
Preceding station	Reading Railroad	Following station
Sanatoga toward Pottsville	Main Line	Royersford toward Philadelphia
Location

Linfield station was a train station in Royersford, Pennsylvania. It served as a station for the Reading Company's Main Line until it closed. It was also known as Limerick Station when the current village of Linfield had the same name.
