= Spring Garden Street station =

Former railway station in Philadelphia

Spring Garden Street
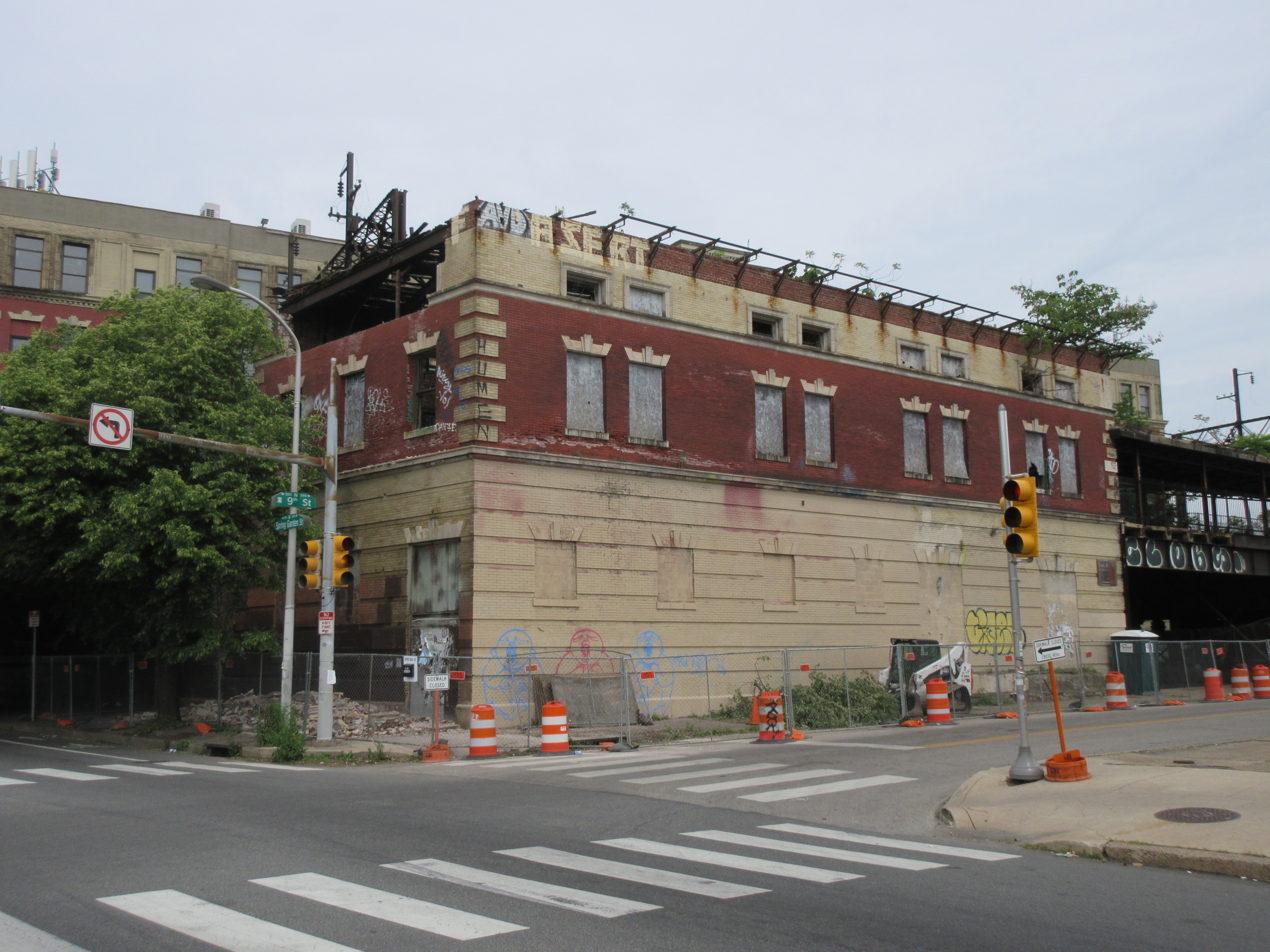
- The abandoned station in May 2021

General information
- Coordinates: 39.961943°N 75.153057°W
- Line: Reading Viaduct (Ninth Street Branch)

History
- Opened: January 29, 1893
- Closed: November 6, 1984
Former services (SEPTA)
Preceding station	SEPTA	Following station
Reading Terminal Terminus	Bethlehem Line	Temple University toward Allentown
Reading Terminal Terminus	Chestnut Hill East Line	Temple University toward Chestnut Hill East
Reading Terminal Terminus	Newtown Line	Temple University toward Newtown
Reading Terminal Terminus	Manayunk/Norristown Line	Temple University toward Norristown–Elm Street
Reading Terminal Terminus	Lansdale/Doylestown Line	Temple University toward Doylestown
Reading Terminal Terminus	Warminster Line	Temple University toward Warminster
Reading Terminal Terminus	West Trenton Line	Temple University toward Newark Penn Station
Pottsville Line did not stop here
Former services (Reading)
Preceding station	Reading Railroad	Following station
Philadelphia Terminus	Main Line	Columbia Avenue toward Pottsville
Philadelphia Terminus	Bethlehem Branch	Columbia Avenue toward Bethlehem
Philadelphia Terminus	Chestnut Hill Branch	Girard Avenue toward Chestnut Hill
Philadelphia Terminus	New York Branch	Columbia Avenue toward Bound Brook
Philadelphia Terminus	Norristown Branch	Columbia Avenue toward Elm Street
Location

Spring Garden Street station was a train station in the Poplar neighborhood of Philadelphia, United States. It was built by the Reading Railroad and located on the Reading Viaduct. Service to Spring Garden Street ended in 1984 with the opening of the Center City Commuter Connection, which bypassed the Reading Terminal, and the building was demolished in 2021.

== History ==
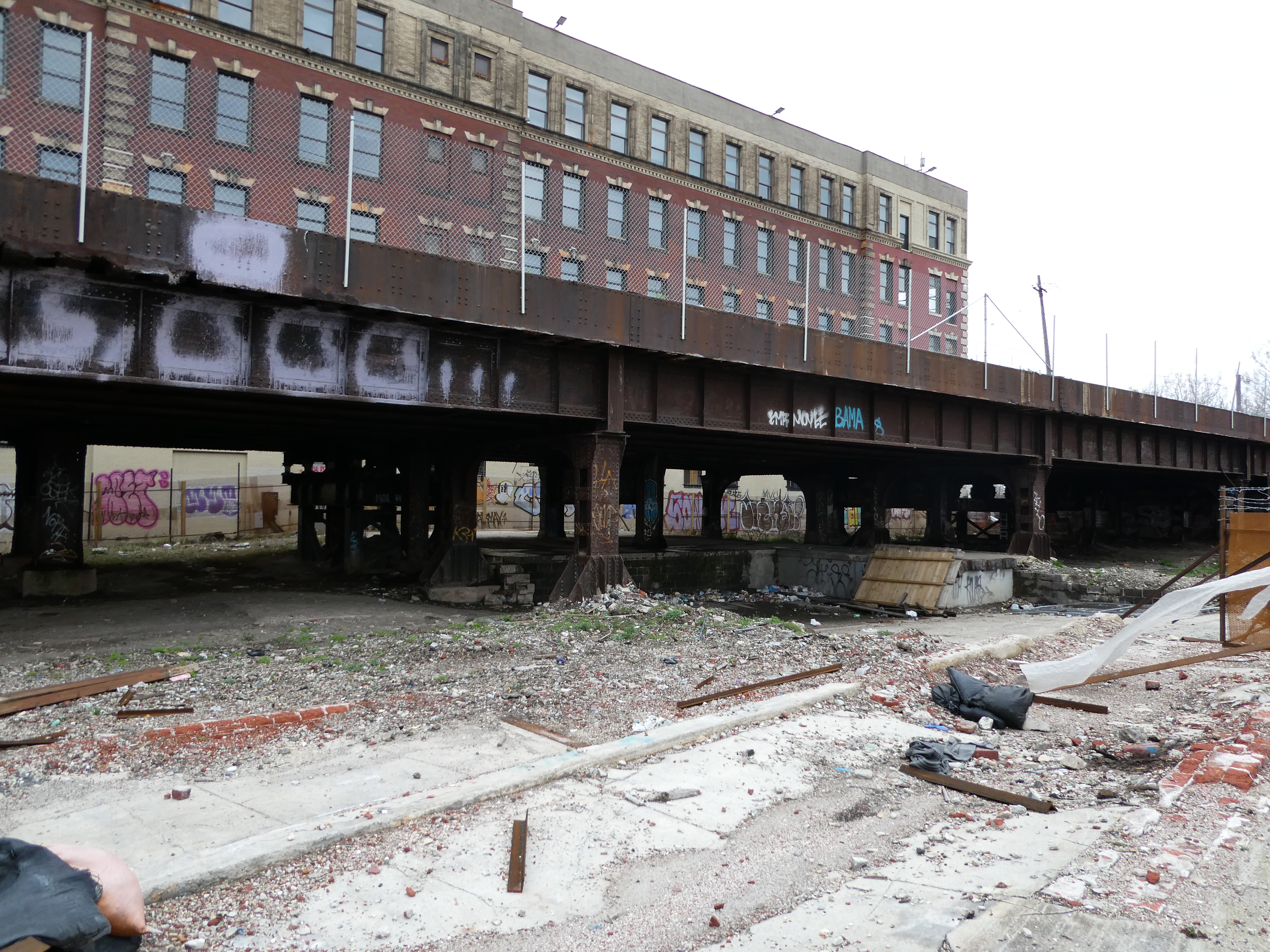
The demolished station in March 2022

Spring Garden Street was built adjacent to the old Philadelphia, Germantown and Norristown Railroad depot at Ninth and Green, which had opened in 1851. Ninth and Green had been the primary Philadelphia terminal of the Philadelphia and Reading Railroad since 1879 and the Reading had outgrown the facility. To replace it, the Reading constructed the Reading Terminal on Market Street, roughly 1 mile (1.6 km) to the south. Reading Terminal was linked to the existing railway line by a new elevated route carried by the Reading Viaduct. Spring Garden Street was built to serve the elevated route. Both it and Reading Terminal opened on January 29, 1893, although the Spring Garden Street station building was not completed and tickets had to be purchased at Ninth and Green. Ninth and Green would remain open as a freight-only building until 1909, when it was demolished to permit additional track elevation.

Spring Garden Street remained in use until 1984, when the new Center City Commuter Connection opened. In March 2021, Reading International, the successor company to the Reading Company, filed paperwork to demolish the building. Arts & Crafts Holdings – a real estate development company – and nonprofit Scioli Turco sought a conservatorship over the building. Reading International handles the company's legacy properties and rights-of-ways. Nevertheless, Philadelphia's Department of Licenses & Inspections issued a permit to Reading International to demolish the station. Demolition began in May 2021.
