= Royersford station =

Railway station in Royersford, Pennsylvania

Royersford
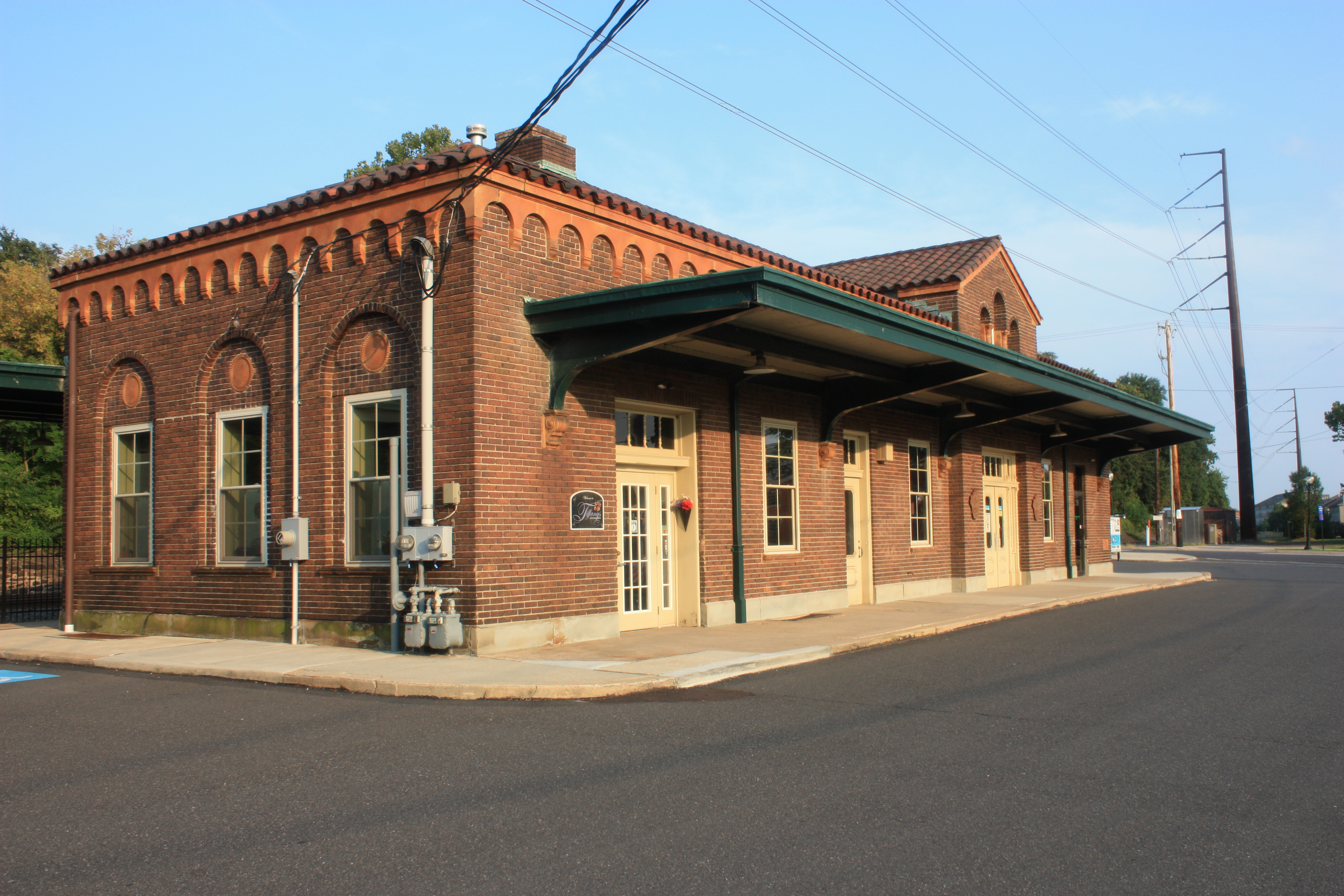
- Royersford station, built in 1931

General information
- Location: 147 Main Street; Royersford, Pennsylvania
- Coordinates: 40.1107°N 75.3216°W
- System: Former SEPTA regional rail station
- Owner: "Pretzel Depot"
- Platforms: 1 side platform
- Tracks: 2

Construction
- Accessible: No

History
- Closed: July 26, 1981

Former services
Preceding station	SEPTA	Following station
Linfield Closed 1978 toward Pottsville	Pottsville Line	Phoenixville Closed 1981 toward Reading Terminal
Preceding station	Reading Railroad	Following station
Linfield toward Pottsville	Main Line	Mingo toward Philadelphia
Location

Royersford station is a former train station in Royersford, Pennsylvania. It is located on Main Street. It was originally built by the Reading Railroad, and later served the SEPTA diesel service line extending from the Norristown section of the Manayunk/Norristown Line to Pottsville. It was taken out of service in 1981, when SEPTA cancelled the diesel service.
