= Reading Viaduct =

Park and viaduct in Philadelphia, Pennsylvania

Reading Viaduct / The Rail Park
- Rail Park in 2024
- Interactive map of Reading Viaduct / The Rail Park
- Type: Elevated urban linear park; public park
- Location: Philadelphia, Pennsylvania, U.S.
- Coordinates: 39.96°N 75.159°W
- Opened: June 14, 2018
- Status: Open

The Reading Viaduct, also called The Rail Park, is a disused elevated rail line in the Callowhill district of Philadelphia, Pennsylvania, that has been partly transformed into a rail trail. The viaduct opened on January 29, 1893, and originally led to Reading Terminal in Center City Philadelphia. It was abandoned in 1984 after Philadelphia's Center City Commuter Tunnel opened. In 2010, the Center City District and a new community organization, Friends of the Rail Park, began to evaluate options to convert the abandoned viaduct into an elevated park. Phase 1 of the park opened on June 14, 2018.

== History ==
=== Railroad use ===
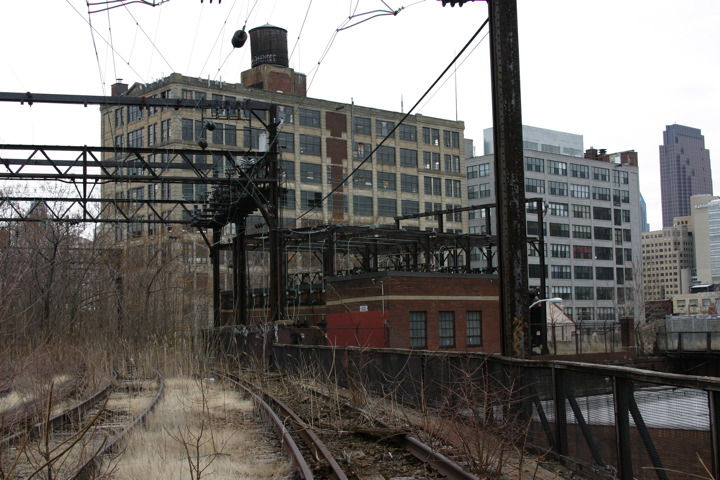
Reading Viaduct before transformation, 2005

The Philadelphia and Reading Terminal Railroad was incorporated on April 13, 1888, leased by the Philadelphia and Reading Railway on May 1, 1891, and soon began construction. The viaduct was built by the Reading Company as an approach to the then-new Reading Terminal. The viaduct and terminal opened on January 29, 1893. The viaduct heads north from Reading Terminal and at Callowhill Junction, forks, with the Ninth Street Branch formally merging with the current SEPTA Main Line. The viaduct cuts through the street grid at a diagonal angle, creating several irregularly shaped lots. The primary section of the viaduct, the Ninth Street Branch, has four tracks.

In 1984, the Reading Terminal closed, and Philadelphia's Center City Commuter Tunnel opened. The southern section of the viaduct, south of Vine Street, was razed in 1990 to make way for the Pennsylvania Convention Center. The rest of the viaduct still exists, as it was too cumbersome to demolish the structure. Additionally, the viaduct was full of pollutants that had to be removed before the structure could be demolished or repurposed.

The viaduct includes a 1,000-foot-long (300 m) westward branch known as the City Branch. The City Branch diverges from the Ninth Street Branch at Callowhill Junction, traveling toward the former Reading Company main line at Belmont Junction. West of 13th Street, the City Branch descends into an open cut known as the Cut, which was operated by the Philadelphia and Reading Railroad. The Cut was used until 1992; the final freight customer on the Cut was The Philadelphia Inquirer.

=== The Rail Park ===
==== First phase ====
By the 1990s, the Reading Company's successor firm Reading International Inc. had offered to give the Philadelphia government $2–3 million to take over the viaduct. The city government did not accept this offer. In the 2000s, there were suggestions to convert the Reading Viaduct to a rail trail. This effort was led by two local artists, John Struble and Sarah McEneaney, who in 2004 formed a nonprofit called Friends of the Rail Park. Students at the University of Pennsylvania School of Design suggested converting the viaduct into a rail trail similar to the Promenade Plantee in Paris. The success of New York City's High Line, a similar rail trail which opened in 2009, encouraged further efforts to convert the Reading Viaduct to a park. Although gates had been installed to prevent access to the decrepit viaduct, people still trespassed anyway, leaving debris and garbage there. Planning for the park accelerated in 2009 after the Center City District joined the project. The district's leader, Paul Levy, commissioned a study that found that it would cost $36 million to convert the viaduct into a park, versus $50 million to demolish it. In addition, Reading International owed $1.4 million in unpaid taxes and was required to conduct environmental remediation.

In 2010, the Center City District and Friends of the Rail Park began to evaluate options to convert the abandoned viaduct into an elevated park. They also began raising money for the planned park. The next year, the planned park was included in a master plan for Philadelphia. However, residents of the nearby Chinatown neighborhood preferred demolishing the viaduct, as they feared that it would lead to gentrification. The Callowhill Reading Viaduct Neighborhood Improvement District was proposed to raise money for streetscape improvements around the viaduct, but the district was not created due to local opposition. The Philadelphia city and Pennsylvania state governments agreed in 2014 to provide money for the conversion of the Reading Viaduct into a park; the city initially allocated $1.8 million to the project. In 2015, the Center City District received another $1 million from the Philadelphia government. After the city proposed acquiring the spur from Broad to Callowhill Street, the City Planning Commission approved the acquisition in May 2015.

Bryan Hanes was hired to design the first phase of the park, and the Philadelphia Art Commission approved designs in June 2015. The first phase of the project was originally planned to cost $9.6 million. The commonwealth of Pennsylvania provided a $3.5 million grant in September 2016, which covered all remaining funding shortfalls. Construction began on the Rail Park's first phase on October 31, 2016. The Rail Park's first phase added a boardwalk, benches, landscaping, and swings. The park's opening was delayed after workers discovered severe deterioration to the bridge that carried the park and Noble Street above 13th Street. The first phase opened to the public on June 14, 2018, having cost $10.3 million or $11 million. The city's mayor Jim Kenney predicted that the park would encourage development in the area. The Rail Park began hosting public art festivals in 2019, starting with the Site/Sound festival that October.

==== Second phase ====
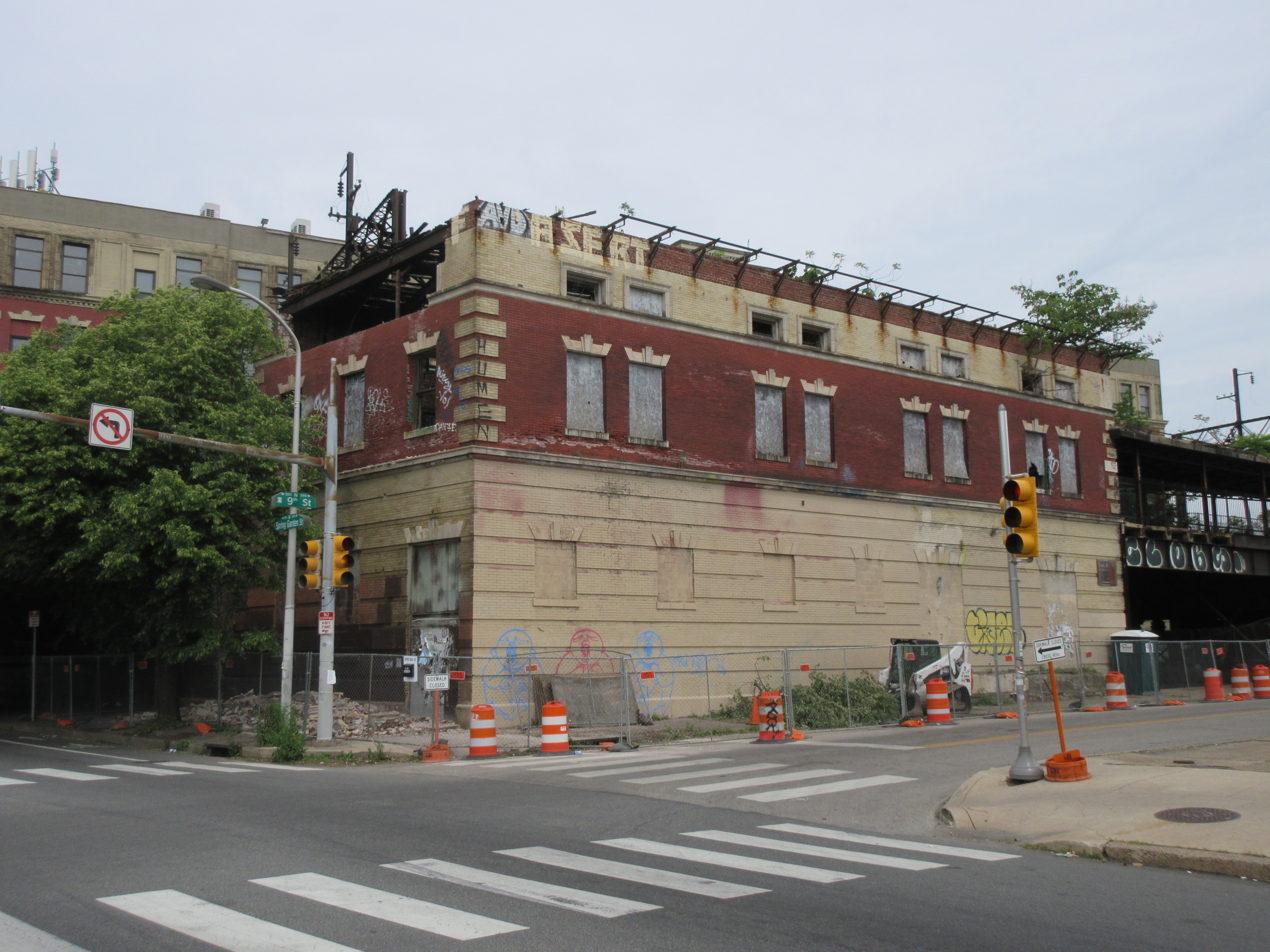
The Spring Garden Street station was located on the viaduct before being demolished in 2021.

Supporters of the Rail Park were raising $60 million for the second phase, including environmental work and land acquisition. This was complicated by the fact that the route had never been formally abandoned; this meant that the viaduct could theoretically be reopened for rail service at any time, even though it had been partially demolished. The old Spring Garden Street station, along the northern section of the viaduct, was razed in 2021. Work on the second phase stalled for several years, and the abandoned Ninth Street Branch portion was used as an illegal dumping ground. In June 2022, Philadelphia City Council member Mark Squilla proposed legislation that would authorize the city to acquire the rest of the viaduct from Reading International.

By 2024, Reading International wanted $50 million to sell the unused part of the viaduct, a figure the Philadelphia government was unwilling to pay. The William Penn Foundation gave a $2 million grant in August 2024, and the federal government provided another $2 million for the park's second phase in January 2025, allowing design to proceed. In addition, the commonwealth of Pennsylvania agreed to provide $475,000 for the project, and additional funds were being raised from private sources. The second phase could connect with the proposed "Stitch", a highway cap above the Vine Street Expressway.

The city government petitioned the Surface Transportation Board (STB) to declare the viaduct abandoned, which would allow the city to acquire it via condemnation and expand the park. In September 2025, the STB ruled that the viaduct, which had been neglected by Reading International for decades, was in fact abandoned and is no longer a railroad under federal jurisdiction. This allowed the city to move toward condemning the property so it could be renovated for public use.

== Approaches ==
The main line of the Philadelphia and Reading Railway (originally the Philadelphia and Columbia Railroad and Northern Liberties and Penn Township Railroad) came into Philadelphia on the southwest side of the Schuylkill River and crossed at a point northwest of downtown (this line is now used only by freight). It then passed into a tunnel under Pennsylvania Avenue and turned east just north of Callowhill Street. The original alignment turned south along Broad Street, with a passenger station at Broad and Vine. The line continued east past Broad Street for freight to the Delaware River, using Willow Street. The passenger station was later moved to half a block east of Broad Street, on the old freight line. The spur from the viaduct was built just east of this station.

The other Reading line, originally the Philadelphia, Germantown and Norristown Railroad, and now used for passenger service by SEPTA, ran north on 9th Street from the east-west line on Willow Street. Its passenger station was at Ninth and Green, again where the new viaduct merged with the old alignment.

== Park description ==
The Rail Park's first phase stretches from Callowhill Street to Noble Street, along the former City Branch, measuring 0.25 miles (0.40 km) long. To the west, it is accessed from Noble Street, where that road and the former City Branch cross 13th Street on a bridge; this is the park's ADA-accessible entrance. The bridge over 13th Street contains several planters. The rest of the park has wooden benches, trees, and raised gardens. There is also a mural on the viaduct, in addition to industrial-looking steel frames with swing sets. At the east end of the park's first phase, there is a staircase descending to Callowhill Street between 12th and 11th streets; a steel gate separates the park from the rest of the abandoned viaduct. The park is open between 7 a.m. and 10 p.m. each day.

The Friends of the Rail Park's original plans called for renovating not only the Ninth Street Branch section of the viaduct from Vine Street to Fairmount Avenue, but also the City Branch to Girard Avenue. The Ninth Street Branch section, known simply as "The Viaduct", extends about 0.5 miles (0.80 km) and creates a "V" shape with the City Branch. West of the first phase is the Cut, an open cut from Broad Street to the Rodin Museum at 22nd Street. This connects with the Tunnel, which extends further west to Brewerytown and the Philadelphia Zoo.

== Gallery ==
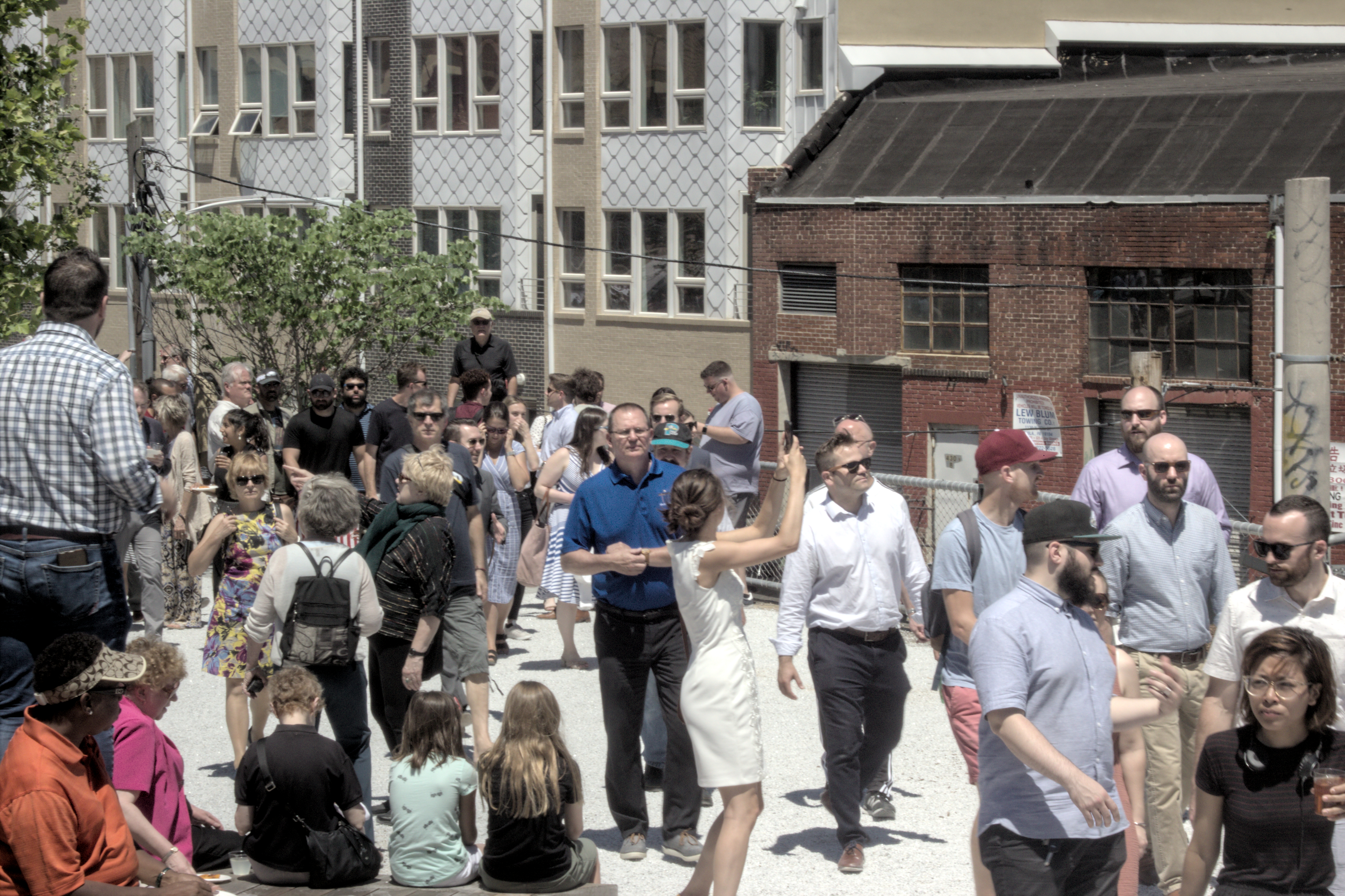
Rail Park opening day on June 14, 2018

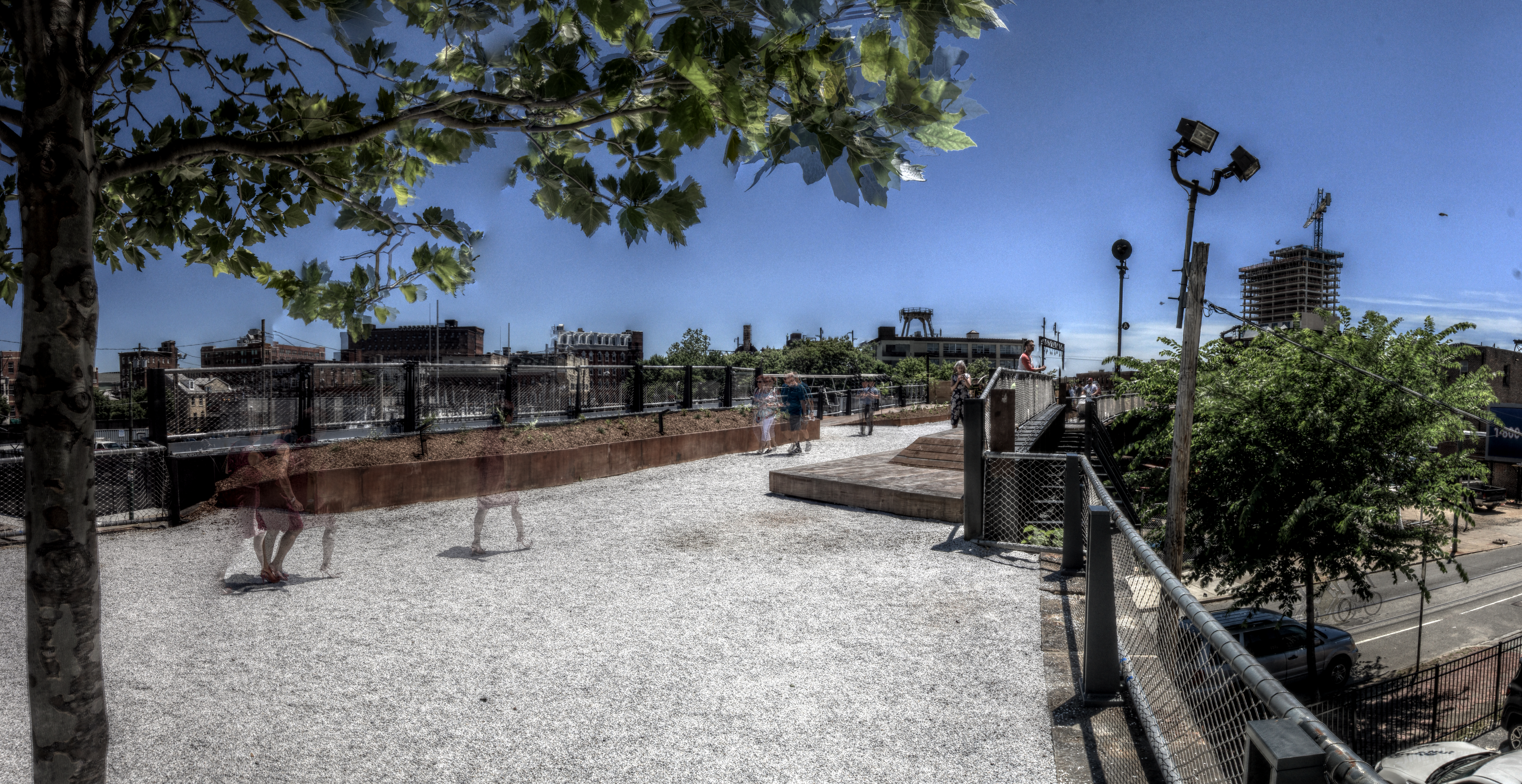
Rail Park in 2018

Rail Park in 2022

Rail Park in 2022

Rail Park in 2024

Rail Park in 2024

== See also ==
- 30th Street Station
- Chinese Wall (Philadelphia)
- Bloomingdale Trail, a converted elevated line in Chicago
- Dequindre Cut, a converted below-grade line in Detroit
