= Reading electric multiple units =

Classes EPA, EPB, EPC, ECA, ECB, ECC
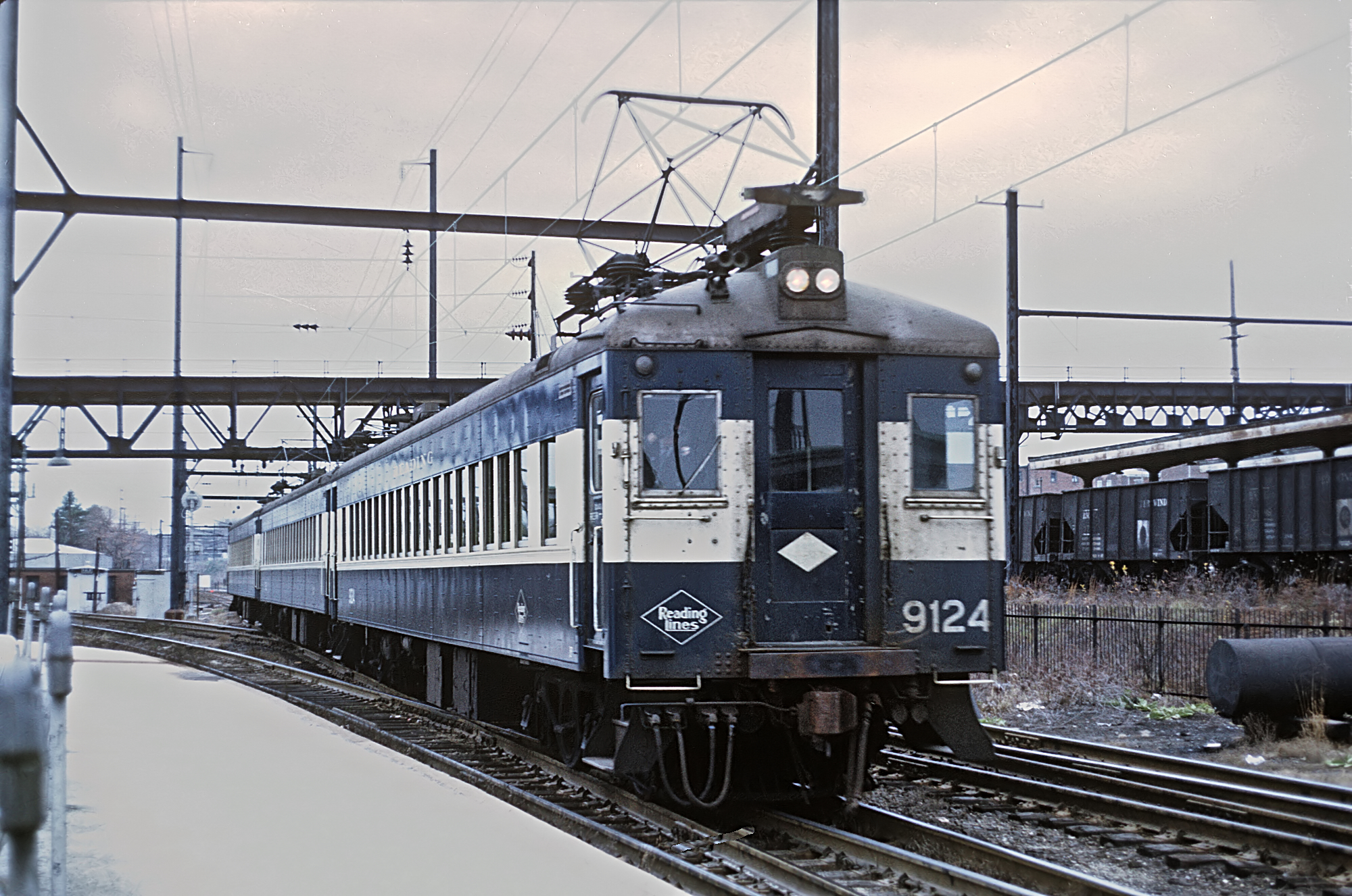
- Reading Company No. 9124 arrives in Norristown, Pennsylvania in 1968
- In service: 1931–1990
- Manufacturers: American Car and Foundry; Bethlehem Steel
- Built at: Harlan and Hollingsworth (Bethlehem)
- Refurbished: 1964–1965
- Number built: 100 (Bethlehem); 8 (ACF)
- Fleet numbers: 800–896 (coaches); 300–308 (coach/baggage); 363–364 (coach/RPO)
- Capacity: 38–86
- Operators: Reading Company; Conrail; SEPTA

Specifications
- Car body construction: Carbon steel
- Car length: 72 ft 11 1/2 in (22.2 m)
- Width: 10 ft 2 1/2 in (3.1 m)
- Height: 15 ft 6 in (4.7 m)
- Maximum speed: 70 mph (112.7 km/h)
- Weight: 127,000 lb (58,000 kg)-129,000 lb (59,000 kg) (Bethlehem); 158,300 lb (71,800 kg) (ACF)
- Traction motors: 2 × Westinghouse 423 or 2 × GE 620 (Bethlehem); 4 × GE 620 (ACF)
- Power output: 550–600 hp (410.1–447.4 kW) (Bethlehem); 1,100 hp (820.3 kW) (ACF)
- Electric system: 12 kV 25 Hz
- Current collection: Pantograph
- Bogies: Commonwealth or Taylor
- Coupling system: Sharon-type knuckle couplers
- Track gauge: 4 ft 8 1/2 in (1,435 mm)

The Reading electric multiple units were a fleet of electric multiple units operated by the Reading Company on its Philadelphia commuter rail lines. The majority were constructed by Bethlehem Steel in 1931–1933; American Car and Foundry delivered additional cars in 1949. Some cars, rebuilt in 1964–1965 and christened "Blueliners", remained in service with Conrail and later the SEPTA until 1990. Several have been preserved.

== Design ==
=== Bethlehem Steel ===
Bethlehem Steel produced a total of 100 cars composed of three types: coaches, baggage-coaches, and baggage-coach-RPO. Each car carried the same dimensions: 72 feet 11 1/2 inches (22.2 m) long, 10 feet 2 1/2 inches (3.1 m) wide, and 15 feet 6 inches (4.7 m) high. The coaches weighed between 127,400–129,000 pounds (57,787.7–58,513.4 kg); the various baggage-coach combines between 125,000–127,000 pounds (56,699.0–57,606.2 kg).

Power was supplied via overhead lines to two traction motors built by either Westinghouse or General Electric (GE). Maximum power output (over one hour) ranged from 275 to 300 horsepower (205.1 to 223.7 kW). In normal operation speed was limited to 70 miles per hour (112.7 km/h), although a maximum of 80 miles per hour (128.7 km/h) was possible.

The coaches, designated EPA (Nos. 800–860) and EPB (Nos. 861–888), carried a total of 86 passengers. The nine coach-baggage cars, designated ECA (Nos. 300–306) and ECB (Nos. 307–308) seated 62 each, while the two baggage-coach-RPOs, designated ECC, seated 38. A single restroom was located at the vestibule end.

=== American Car and Foundry ===
Externally the eight motor cars that American Car and Foundry (ACF) built were similar to the older Bethlehem Steel cars. The primary difference was that they carried four traction motors instead of two and could develop 1,100 horsepower (820.3 kW). Another important difference was the use of an oil-cooled transformer. As was common for the period the coolant contained polychlorinated biphenyl (PCBs); it was not until the 1960s that PCBs were phased out because of their toxicity. The presence of PCBs in the transformers led to the premature retirement of the ACF cars in lieu of a rebuild. At 158,300 pounds (71,800 kg) the cars were significantly heavier than the Bethlehem-built cars.

== History ==
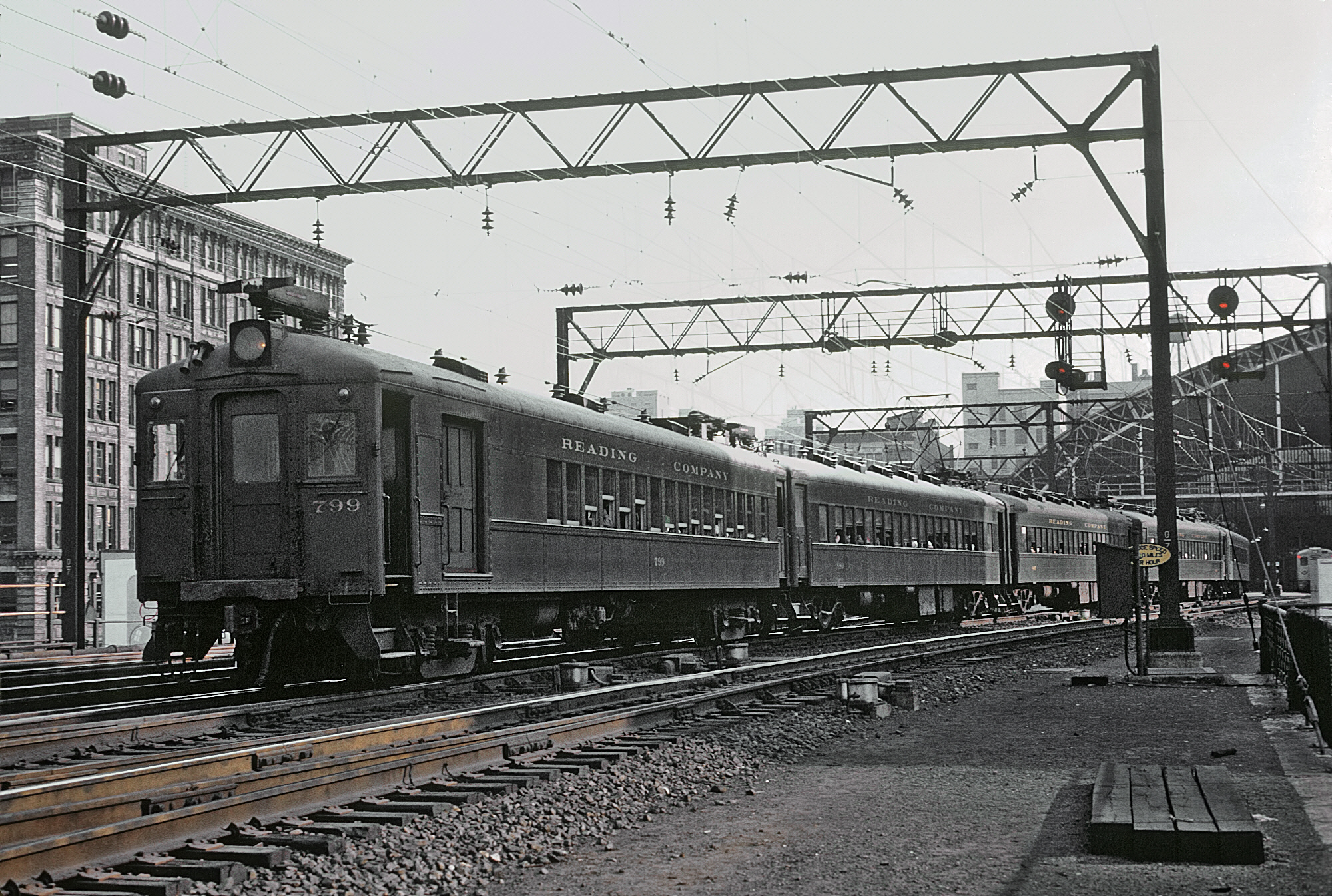
A set of electric multiple units outside the Reading Terminal in 1964. Unpowered trailer No. 799 is in the foreground.

The Reading undertook the electrification of its Philadelphia commuter lines in the late 1920s. The first lines electrified were the Ninth Street Branch, New Hope Branch as far as Hatboro (extended to Warminster in 1974), the Bethlehem Branch as far as Lansdale, the Doylestown Branch, and the New York Branch to West Trenton. To protect this service the Reading ordered 89 electric multiple units from Bethlehem Steel: 61 coaches, seven baggage-coaches, and two baggage-coach-RPOs. These were supplemented by twenty unpowered coach trailers converted from existing coaches. The new electrified services began operation on July 26, 1931.

The Reading extended electrification to the Norristown Branch and Chestnut Hill Branch in 1933. For this service the Reading ordered 30 additional cars from Bethlehem Steel, identical to the first batch: 28 coaches and two baggage-coaches. Following World War II Reading bought eight more coaches, this time from American Car and Foundry. They were paired with eight unpowered coach trailers converted from existing coaches. The new equipment arrived in 1949.

Between 1963–1965 the Reading completely rebuilt 38 of the cars. These were designated RER and popularly known as "Blueliners" from their distinctive white-and-blue livery. The rebuilt cars were renumbered into the 9101–9138 range. Un-rebuilt cars were known colloquially as "Reading 'green' cars" as they remained in their original livery. Both the green cars and the Blueliners continued running under Conrail and SEPTA; a set of Blueliner cars formed the final train to leave Reading Terminal in 1984. Blueliners were also the last cars to operate to West Chester in 1986 when service on the West Chester Branch was cut back to Elwyn. SEPTA retired the last of its Blueliners from revenue service in 1990.
