= Linfield, Pennsylvania =

Unincorporated village in Pennsylvania, U.S.

Village of Linfield
- Unincorporated Village
- Location of Linfield in Pennsylvania Village of Linfield (the United States)
- Coordinates: 40°12′36″N 75°34′013″W
- Country: United States
- State: Pennsylvania
- County: Montgomery
- Elevation: 141 ft (43 m)
- Time zone: UTC-5 (EST)
  - Summer (DST): UTC-4 (EDT)
- ZIP Code: 19468
- Area code: 610
- Website: www.limerickpa.org

Linfield is an unincorporated village, part of Limerick Township in Montgomery County, Pennsylvania, United States. It is located approximately 35 miles northwest of Philadelphia, along the Schuylkill River.

Located on the Reading Railroad line to Philadelphia, Linfield was the industrial hub of Limerick Township into the 1960s. Kinseys Distillery, Sanitary Corporation of America, and Trinley Mill provided the industrial base for the area.

== History ==
The area called Linfield was originally known as Limerick Station, named for the former Linfield station. In 1884 there was an attempt to incorporate the area as a borough. The Continental Army marched through Linfield during the Philadelphia Campaign of 1777.

== Geography ==
Linfield is located at 40°12′36″N 75°34′13″W (40.2101520, -75.5701920). The village lies on the northern banks of the Schuylkill River across from Parker Ford.

== Politics and government ==
The village is part of the Fourth Congressional District represented currently by Madeleine Dean, the 146th State House District represented currently by Joe Ciresi, and the 44th State Senate District represented currently by Katie Muth.

== See also ==
- Parker Ford, Pennsylvania
