= Pottsville Line =

Former SEPTA Regional Rail service

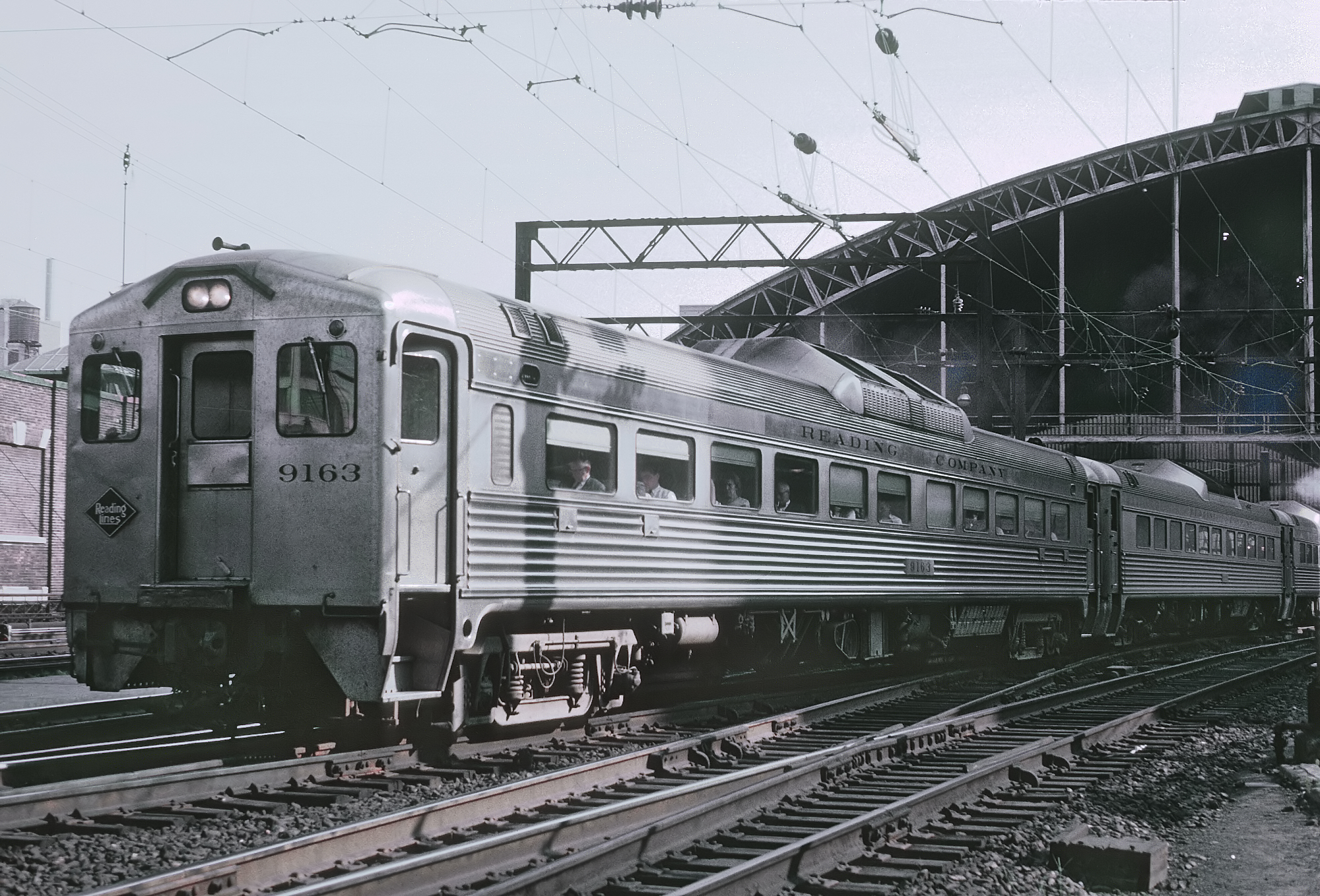
- A Reading Company Budd Rail Diesel Car leaves Reading Terminal in 1964

Overview
- Status: Discontinued
- Last service: 26 July 1981

Route
- Average journey time: 2 hours 30 minutes
- Lines used: Reading main line; Norristown Branch; Ninth Street Branch

Technical
- Rolling stock: Budd Rail Diesel Cars

The Pottsville Line was a commuter rail service in the Philadelphia metropolitan area, connecting Pottsville, Reading, and Pottstown with Philadelphia. It was the last vestige of passenger service on the former Reading main line. The service lasted into the SEPTA era and was discontinued in 1981. SEPTA continues to operate Manayunk/Norristown Line commuter trains between Philadelphia and Norristown.

== Route ==
Trains originated at Pottsville, at the northern end of the Reading main line and 93.6 miles (150.6 km) from the Reading Terminal in Philadelphia. Major intermediate stops included Reading, Pottstown, and Phoenixville. At Norristown, trains left the main line and crossed the Schuylkill River, joining the electrified Norristown Branch. Pottsville trains skipped most intermediate stops, stopping only at Norristown-De Kalb and North Broad Street before reaching Reading Terminal.

== History ==
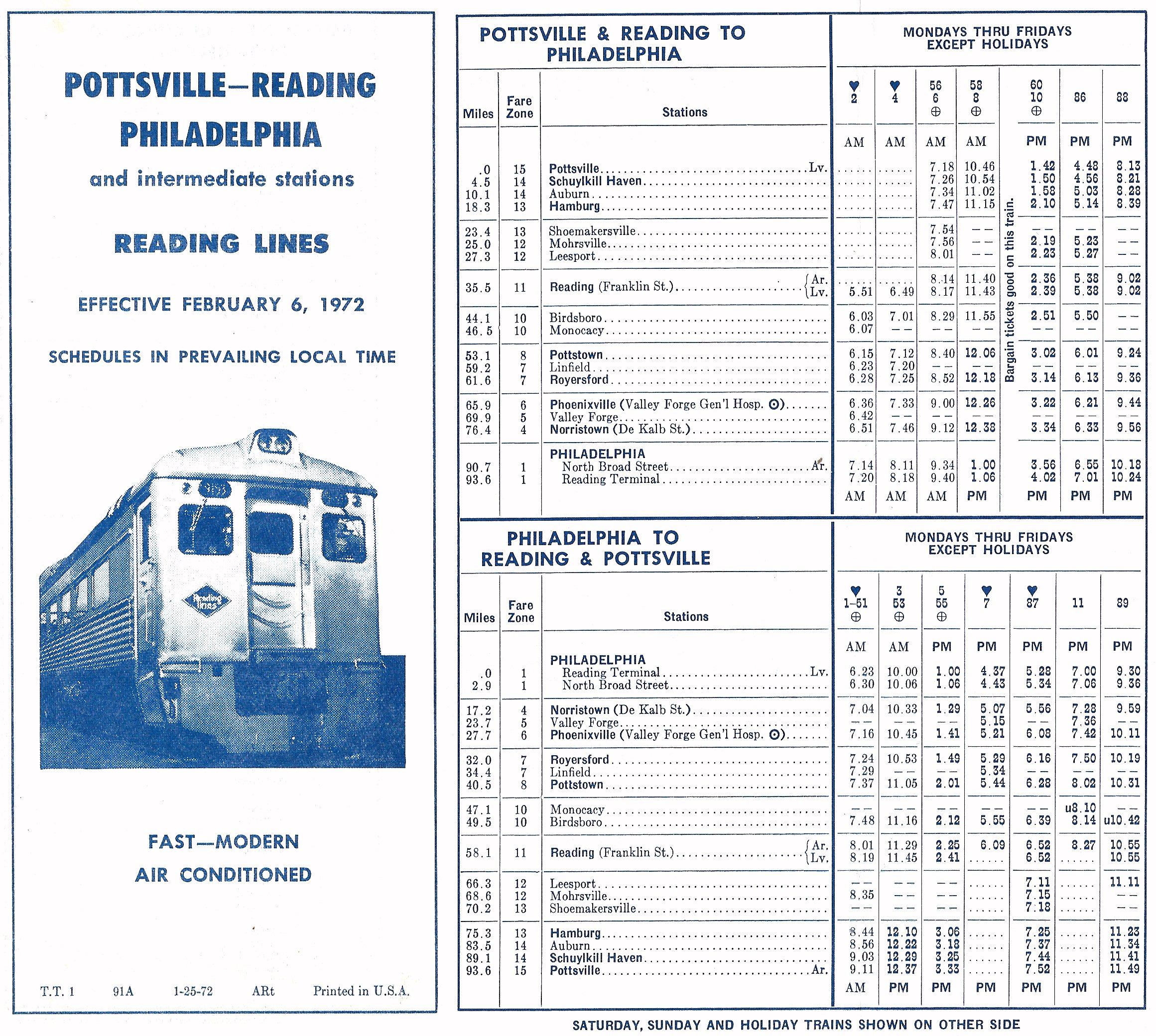
Passenger Timetable (eff. 1972-02-06) for Reading Lines service along the Pottsville Line between Pottsville, Penn. via Reading, Penn. to Philadelphia

The Reading's electrified territory ended at Norristown; the Great Depression curtailed plans to extend electrification up the main line. Electrification and multiple unit operation permitted more frequent service to Norristown. At the end of the 1970s service operated at 30 minute headways, compared to seven round-trips per day to Reading or Pottsville.

When Amtrak was forming in 1970–1971, the Reading determined that its longer-distance trains qualified as commuter trains and stayed out of the system. (Note: The Interstate Commerce Commission had defined various criteria for assessing whether a train qualified as a "commuter train," including the character of the operation and ridership and the distance traveled.) Public subsidy of the trains began in the late 1960s. Conrail replaced the Reading as the operator of the service after the latter's bankruptcy. SEPTA subsidized operations within its five-county area; practically speaking, no further than Pottstown. Federal and state subsidies made up the difference.

The Pottsville line was one of four diesel routes that were part of the SEPTA network at the end of the 1970s. (Note: The others were the Bethlehem/Quakertown service, extending from Lansdale, the former Wall Street and Crusader trains to Newark, and the shuttles on the Newtown Branch.) Most trains ran with Budd Rail Diesel Cars; SEPTA also had three EMD FP7 locomotives and a set of coaches. The Pottsville service faced several challenges:

1. The section between Pottstown and Pottsville lay outside SEPTA's five-county area. Funds to operate that part of the service had to be drawn from state and federal sources, or from entities within Berks and Schuylkill County.
2. The diesel-powered equipment was aging and increasingly unreliable.
3. The Center City Commuter Connection, begun in 1978, would open in 1984. The tunnel would link the ex-Pennsylvania Railroad and ex-Reading parts of the commuter rail network, transforming operations. It would also lead to the closure of the Reading Terminal, and the end of direct diesel service to Philadelphia.

A change in Pennsylvania state law, effective at the start of 1981, significantly reduced the subsidy for SEPTA services outside the five-county area. SEPTA estimated the combined shortfall for the Bethlehem and Pottsville trains at $2 million. Berks and Schuylkill counties refused to subsidize the service, and SEPTA initially planned to truncate service at Pottstown, the last station within the five-county area. Through operation to Philadelphia would be replaced by a rail shuttle to Norristown. A final attempt to preserve service, with the Pennsylvania Department of Transportation (PennDOT) providing subsidies and the Berks Area Reading Transportation Authority (BARTA) acting as operator, foundered when BARTA rejected the arrangement.

Service north of Pottstown ended on July 1, 1981. SEPTA, in the middle of a major funding dispute with Conrail, discontinued the Pottstown shuttles on July 26, 1981, as part of broader system cutbacks.

== Restoration proposals ==
Since the end of the Pottsville trains there have been various proposals for restoring service over the former Reading main line:

- the Schuylkill Valley Metro, which contemplated service between Philadelphia and Reading using the former Reading main line and parts of the abandoned ex-Pennsylvania Railroad Schuylkill Branch. The project failed to obtain funding was canceled in 2006.
- Amtrak, as part of its "Amtrak Connects US", proposed restoring Philadelphia to Reading service using the main line and bypassing the Norristown Branch. The proposal was announced in 2021 and received funding from the Federal Railroad Administration in 2023.
