= Ninth Street Branch =

Railway line in Pennsylvania

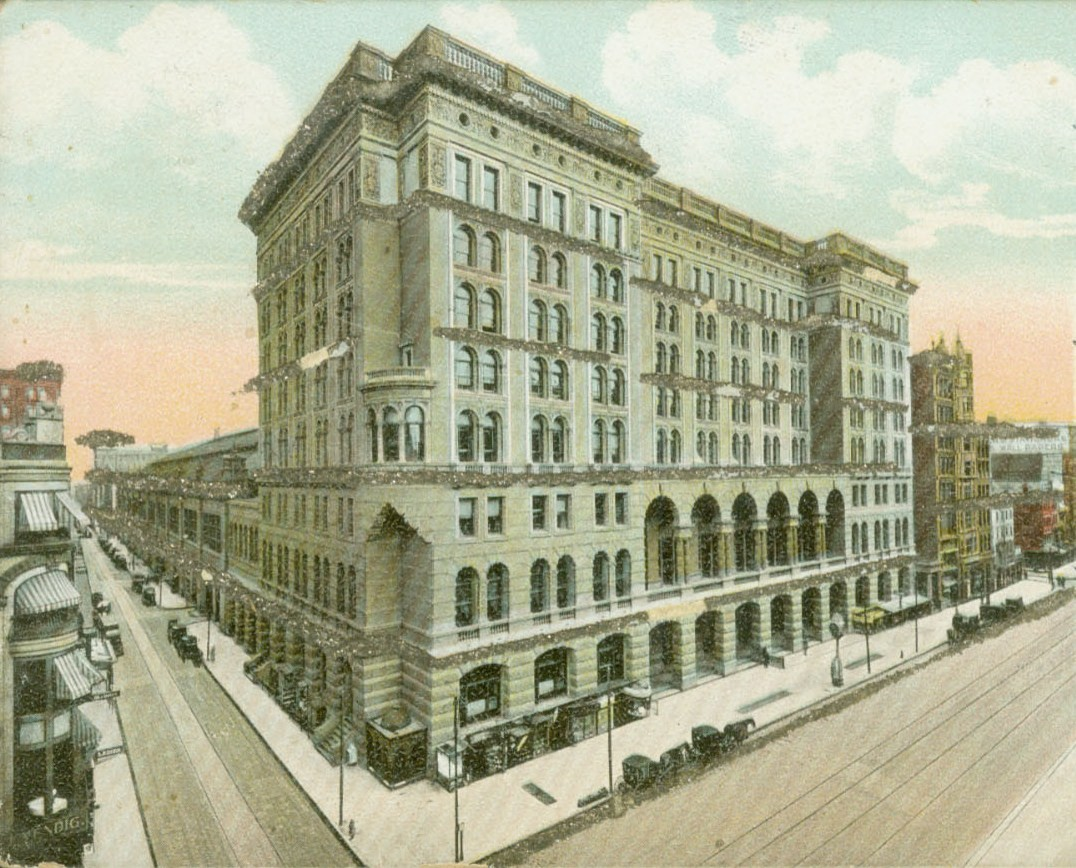
- The Reading Terminal in 1906

Overview
- Status: Conveyed to Conrail and SEPTA
- Owner: Reading Company
- Locale: Philadelphia
- Termini: Reading Terminal; Tabor Junction

History
- Opened: 6 June 1832
- Branch fully elevated: January 1, 1911
- Electrification: July 26, 1931
- Closed: 12 November 1984

Technical
- Line length: 7.0 mi (11.3 km)
- Number of tracks: 4
- Character: Fully elevated and grade-separated
- Track gauge: 4 ft 8 1/2 in (1,435 mm) standard gauge
- Electrification: 12 kV 25 Hz overhead line

The Ninth Street Branch was an elevated railway line in Philadelphia, Pennsylvania. It was operated by the Reading Company; ownership was split between the Reading and its subsidiary the Philadelphia, Germantown and Norristown Railroad. It was a four-tracked main line beginning at the Reading Terminal, the Reading's terminus in Philadelphia, and extending north into the city to a junction with the Bethlehem Branch. After the final bankruptcy of the Reading, the line passed to Conrail and later SEPTA. The portion south of the Temple University station was abandoned in 1984 with the opening of the Center City Commuter Connection and is now known as the Reading Viaduct; the portion north is now part of the SEPTA Main Line.

== Route ==
The line originated at the Reading Terminal, an elevated railway station which opened in 1893. As the line continued north along the Reading Viaduct, the City Branch, a freight-only route, diverged almost immediately. Four tracks continued north to the North 16th Street Junction with the Norristown Branch. At Wayne Junction the Chestnut Hill Branch diverged and the Ninth Street Branch narrowed to two tracks. At Newtown Junction, between Logan and Tabor, the New York Short Line (originally the Newtown Branch) diverged. At Tabor Junction, just beyond Tabor, the branch joined the Bethlehem Branch. Up until the final conveyance to Conrail in 1976 the Philadelphia, Germantown and Norristown owned the portion between North Broad Street and Tabor Junction, while the Reading Company owned the line south from North Broad Street to the Reading Terminal.

== History ==
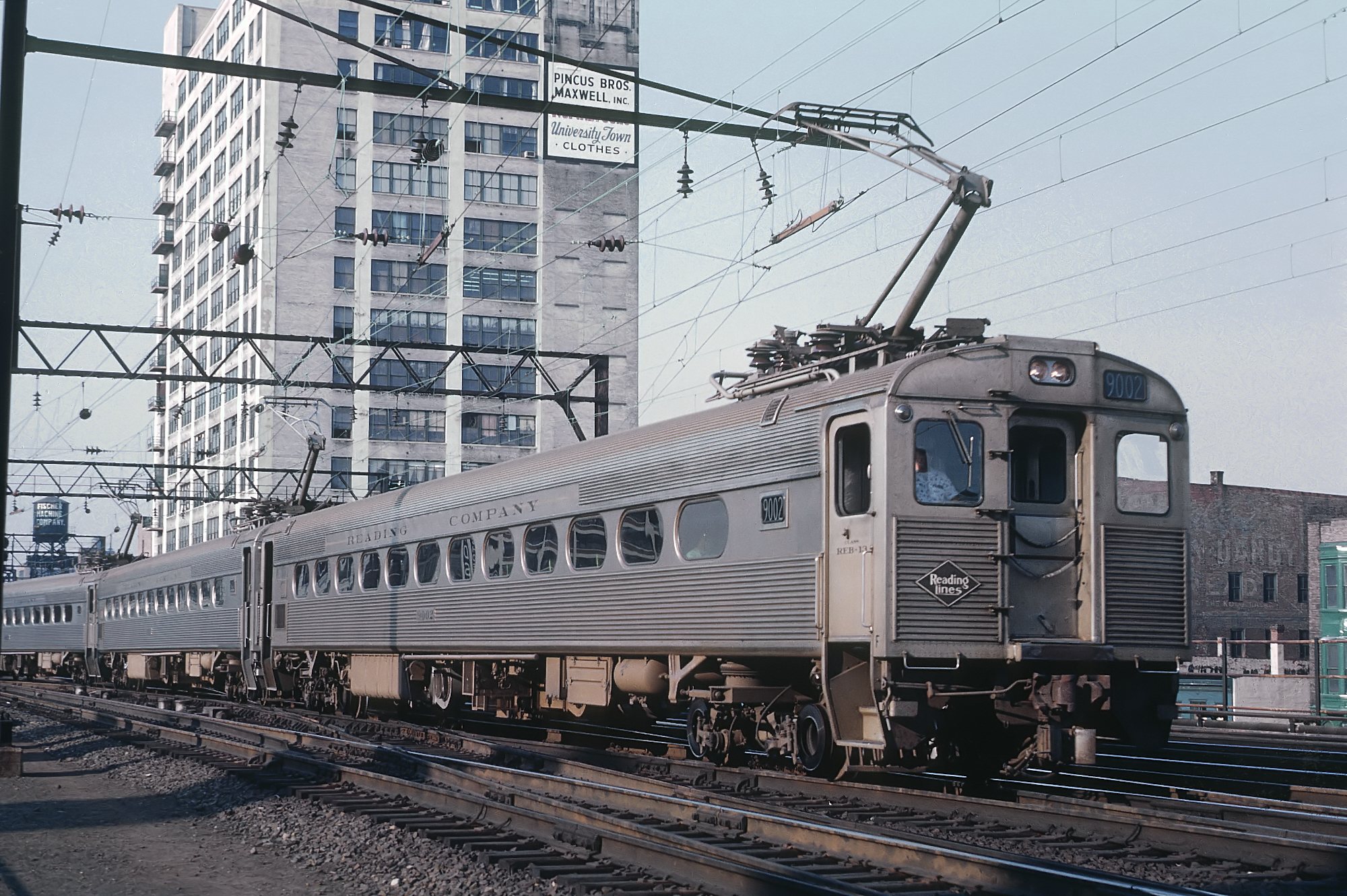
A Reading Silverliner II on the Ninth Street Branch in 1964

The first part of what came to be called the Ninth Street Branch was the Philadelphia, Germantown and Norristown Railroad's line between Philadelphia and Germantown, which opened on June 6, 1832. The Philadelphia and Reading Railroad, forerunner of the Reading Company, leased the PG&N on December 1, 1870. The P&R's primary Philadelphia depot was then at Broad and Callowhill, but it began routing some trains to the PG&N's depot at Ninth and Green as well.

The Reading leased the North Pennsylvania Railroad in 1879, adding the North Pennsylvania's substantial network of suburban Philadelphia lines and what became the New York Branch–the North Penn's New York–Philadelphia line. Also in 1879 the Reading constructed the Tabor Branch from Wayne Junction, where the PG&N's original line continued toward Germantown, to the North Penn's Bethlehem Branch at Tabor Junction. This permitted the Reading to route New York-bound trains over the PG&N as well. Finally, at the urging of the City of Philadelphia, the Reading consolidated its passenger options on the PG&N route. The Reading constructed the Reading Terminal, a new elevated terminal at Twelfth and Market. An elevated line connected the terminal to the existing line at Ninth and Green. The extension opened on January 29, 1893.

The line north of Ninth and Green remained at street level and its grade crossings saw numerous accidents. Again at the urging of the city, and after the route acquired the derisive sobriquet "Death Alley", the Reading elevated the entire branch. Work began on October 3, 1907 and was completed on January 1, 1911. During the late 1920s the Reading implemented a 12 kV 25 Hz overhead electrification on its Philadelphia commuter lines which originated from the Reading Terminal. Electric service began on July 26, 1931.

=== Partial closure ===
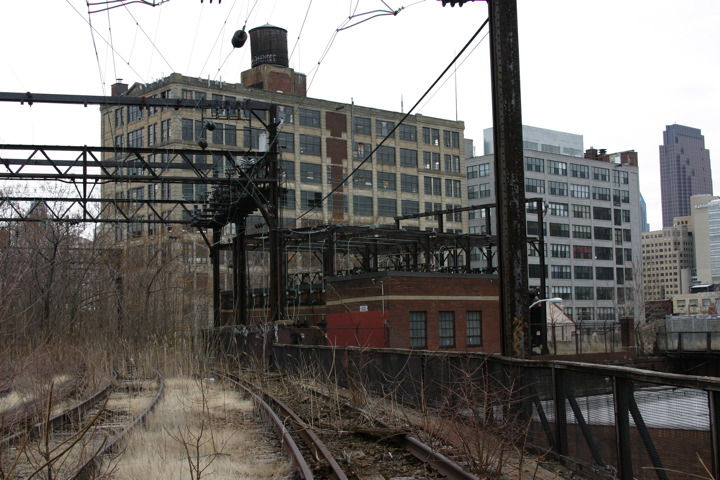
Abandoned railroad tracks of the Reading Viaduct

The Reading Company and its subsidiaries were incorporated into Conrail; the Ninth Street Branch was designated to Conrail as part of the United States Railway Association's "Final System Plan". Under Conrail the branch remained as it had been under the Reading, but change was coming. Discussed for decades, the Center City Commuter Connection opened November 12, 1984. This tunnel, which diverged from the Ninth Street Branch south of Temple University, permitted trains on the Reading commuter lines to access the former Pennsylvania Railroad lines via Suburban Station. Reading Terminal and Spring Garden Street were closed. The former Ninth Street Branch between Temple University and Tabor Junction is now part of the SEPTA Main Line, while the abandoned elevated line is known as the Reading Viaduct.
