= Reading Terminal =

Former rail station in Philadelphia

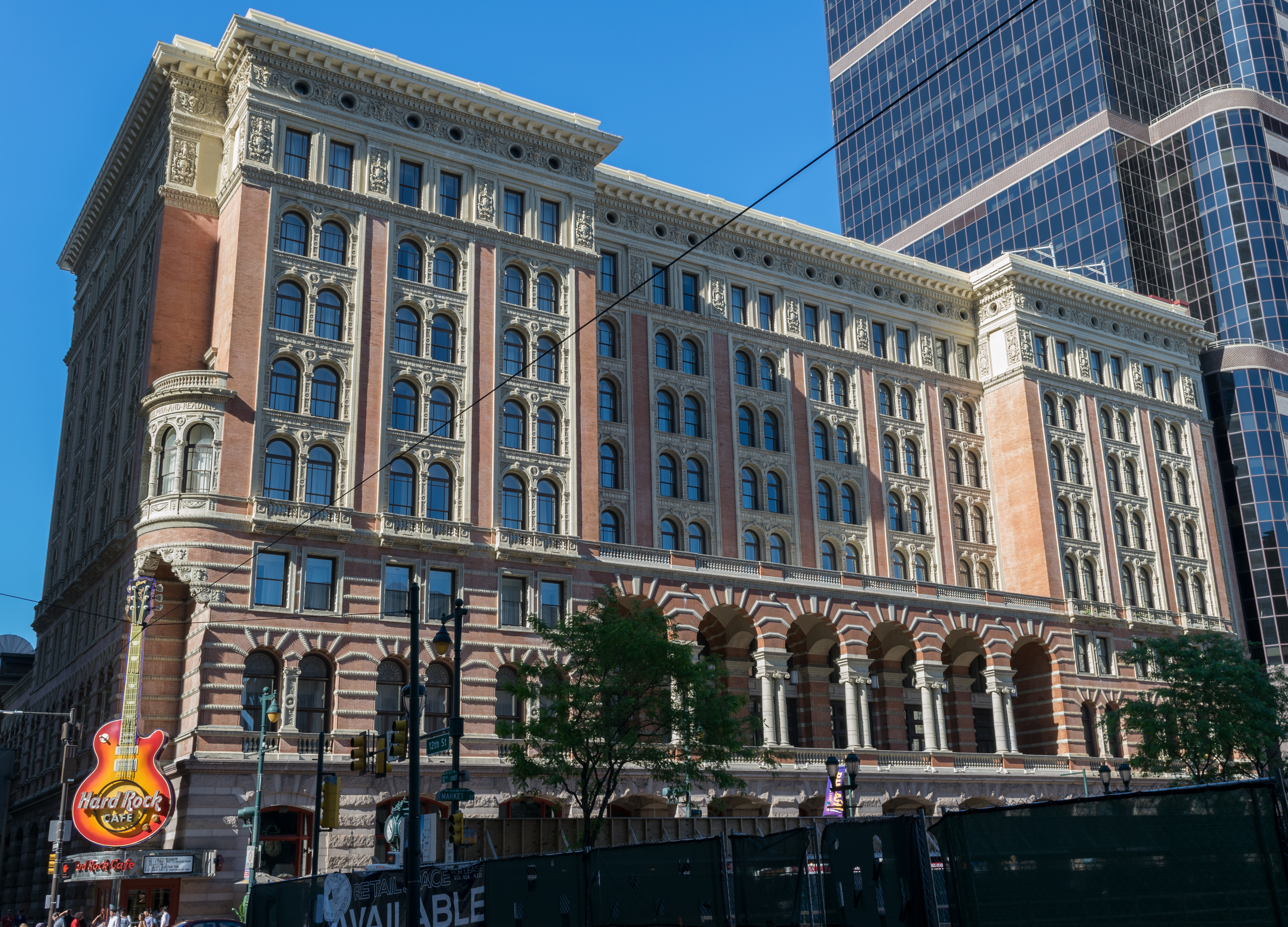

General information
- Location: 1115–1141 Market Street, Philadelphia, Pennsylvania 19107, U.S.
- System: Former SEPTA regional rail station
- Line: Ninth Street Branch
- Connections: SEPTA at Jefferson Station and 11th Street

Construction
- Accessible: No

History
- Opened: January 29, 1893
- Closed: November 6, 1984
Former services (SEPTA)
Preceding station	SEPTA	Following station
Terminus	Bethlehem Line	Spring Garden Street toward Allentown
Terminus	Chestnut Hill East Line	Spring Garden Street toward Chestnut Hill East
Terminus	Newtown Line	Spring Garden Street toward Newtown
Terminus	Manayunk/Norristown Line	Spring Garden Street toward Norristown–Elm Street
Terminus	Lansdale/Doylestown Line	Spring Garden Street toward Doylestown
Terminus	Pottsville Line	North Broad Street toward Pottsville
Terminus	Warminster Line	Spring Garden Street toward Warminster
Terminus	West Trenton Line	Spring Garden Street toward Newark Penn Station
Preceding station	Conrail	Following station
Terminus	Crusader and Wall Street 1976–1981	Spring Garden Street toward Newark
Former services (Reading / B&O)
Preceding station	Reading Railroad	Following station
Terminus	Main Line	Spring Garden Street toward Pottsville
Terminus	Bethlehem Branch	Spring Garden Street toward Bethlehem
Terminus	Chestnut Hill Branch	Spring Garden Street toward Chestnut Hill
Terminus	Frankford Branch	North Broad Street toward Frankford
Terminus	Newtown Branch	Wayne Junction toward Newtown
Terminus	New Hope Branch	Wayne Junction toward New Hope
Terminus	New York Branch	Spring Garden Street toward Bound Brook
Terminus	Norristown Branch	Spring Garden Street toward Elm Street
Preceding station	Baltimore and Ohio Railroad	Following station
Terminus	Philadelphia – Jersey City Local	Wayne Junction toward Jersey City
- Reading Terminal and Trainshed
- U.S. National Register of Historic Places
- U.S. National Historic Landmark
- Pennsylvania state historical marker
- Interactive map of Reading Terminal and Trainshed
- Location: 1115–1141 Market St., Philadelphia, Pennsylvania
- Coordinates: 39°57′9.41″N 75°9′34″W
- Built: 1891–1893
- Architect: Wilson Brothers & Company (train shed); Francis H. Kimball (headhouse)
- NRHP reference No.: 72001170

Significant dates
- Added to NRHP: June 30, 1972
- Designated NHL: December 8, 1976
- Designated PHMC: September 10, 2003
Location

The Reading Terminal (/ˈrɛdɪŋ/ RED-ing) is a complex of buildings that includes the former Reading Company main railroad station located in the Market East section of Center City Philadelphia, Pennsylvania, United States. It comprises the Reading Terminal Headhouse, Trainshed, and Reading Terminal Market (known for its farmers market and the presence of Pennsylvania Dutch food vendors).

== History ==
=== Construction ===
In 1889, the Philadelphia and Reading Railway decided to build a train depot, passenger station, and company headquarters on the corner of 12th and Market Streets. The move came eight years after the Pennsylvania Railroad opened its Broad Street Station several blocks away at 15th and Market Streets, and one year after the Baltimore and Ohio Railroad opened its 24th Street Station at 24th and Chestnut Streets.

The chosen location was occupied by an open-air market that had been in continuous operation since 1853. After loud complaints and much negotiation, the railroad agreed to purchase the markets for $1 million and move them to a new structure: the Reading Terminal Market, located to the rear (north) of the headhouse at 12th and Filbert Streets. This required the trainshed and all of its tracks to be constructed one story above street level, with trains entering and exiting the station via the Reading Viaduct and Ninth Street Branch.

==== Architecture ====
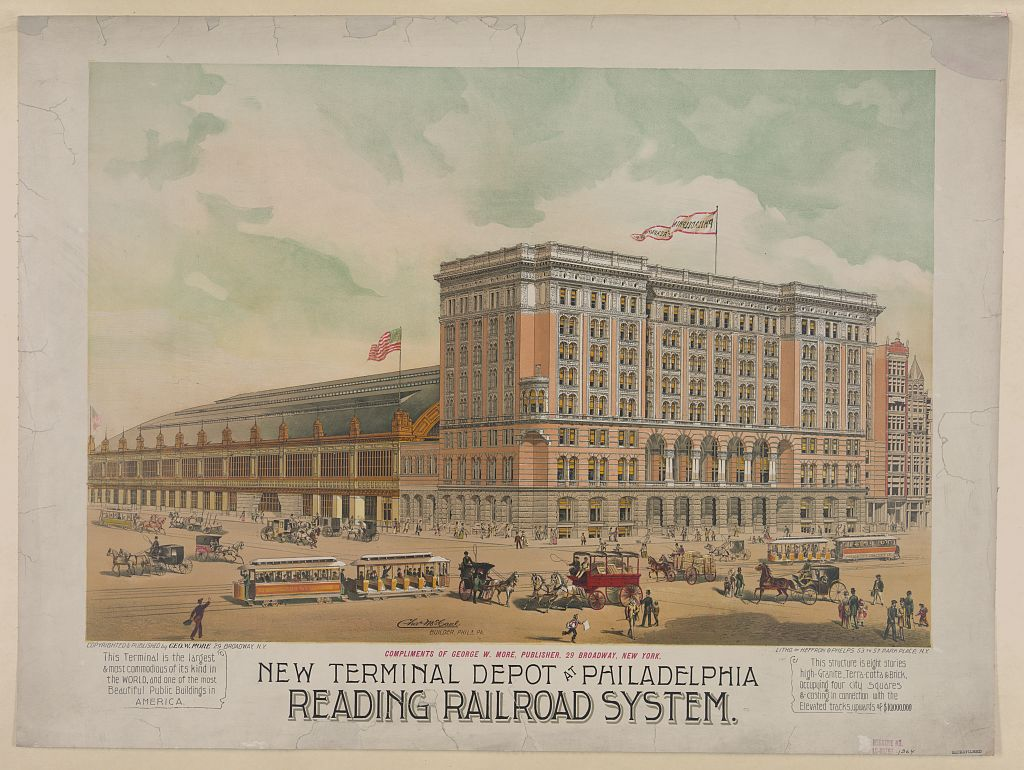
New Terminal Depot at Philadelphia, Reading Railroad System lithograph, circa 1891

The headhouse was designed in 1891 by Francis H. Kimball, and the train shed by Wilson Brothers & Company. Construction began that same year, and the station opened on January 29, 1893. At the time, the trainshed was one of the largest single-span arched-roof structures in the world.

The following year, the Wilson Brothers would build an even larger trainshed three blocks away, for the Pennsylvania Railroad's Broad Street Station. The Reading's trainshed is now the only such structure left in the United States.

The complex was fronted on Market by an eight-story headhouse that housed the passenger station and company headquarters. Built in the Italian Renaissance style, the headhouse has brick bearing walls with cast-iron columns and timber floors. Interior finishes include molded ornamental plaster and marble with cast-iron detailing.

=== Reading Terminal Station ===
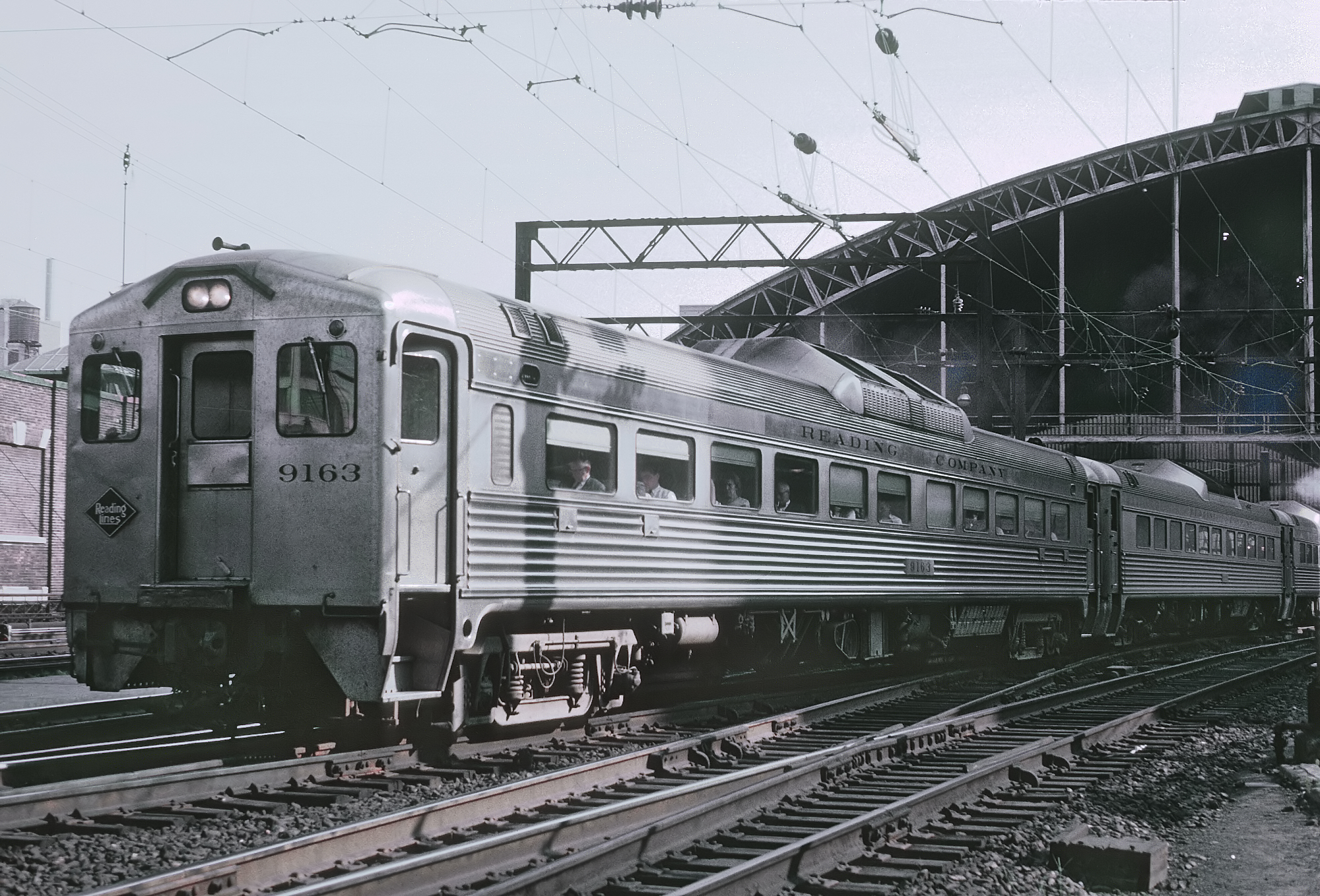
A Reading commuter train departs Reading Terminal, September 1964

Reading Terminal served the railroad's inter-city and regional rail trains, many of which are still running as part of the SEPTA Regional Rail system that connects Center City with outlying neighborhoods and suburbs, especially to the north. Many of those trains would be converted to electric power in a project that began in 1928 and basically completed in 1933, with the Newtown Branch being electrified to Fox Chase in 1966.

Daily traffic peaked during World War II with up to 45,000 daily passengers, then declined in the 1950s with the advance of road and air travel.

Major named inter-city trains in mid-20th century:

- Black Diamond: to Buffalo's Lackawanna Terminal (in partnership with Lehigh Valley Railroad)
- Crusader: to Jersey City (Communipaw Terminal)
- Interstate Express: to Syracuse (in partnership with Lackawanna Railroad)
- King Coal: to Pottsville via Reading
- Maple Leaf: to Toronto via Buffalo (in partnership with Lehigh Valley Railroad)
- Schuykill: to Pottsville via Reading
- Scranton Flyer: to Scranton

The terminal buildings declined with the railroad's fortunes as maintenance budgets were cut. The Reading declared bankruptcy on November 23, 1971. The shed was placed on the National Register of Historic Places in 1972 and was declared a National Historic Landmark in 1976.

In 1976, Conrail took over the freight operations of the Reading and other northeastern lines. The railroad's regional rail service went to SEPTA, the regional transit authority for Philadelphia (though Conrail ran the services under contract from SEPTA until 1983). Still, the Reading retained ownership of its Terminal complex. SEPTA also gained control of the ex-PRR regional lines and consolidated all regional rail service.

The agency then launched the construction of the Center City Commuter Connection, a rail tunnel to connect the former Reading Railroad commuter lines with the former Pennsylvania Railroad commuter lines at Suburban Station, the stub-end terminal of the ex-PRR network, located on the site of the former Broad Street Station. Because the stations were to connect underground—Suburban Station's terminal is located beneath the former PRR headquarters—the Market East Station was built to replace the Reading Terminal with its elevated platforms. The new station is adjacent to and partially under Reading Terminal.

Reading Terminal handled its last train, a specially made-up train using Blueliners from Lansdale, on November 6, 1984. Four days later, after final track connections were made to the Center City Commuter Connection tunnel, rail service on the ex-Reading Lines to and from Center City Philadelphia was via the Market East Station.

=== Later use ===
In the years that followed, the Reading Terminal's fate was uncertain, with various proposals for replacement or adaptive reuse. Its demolition was staved off by a group led by urban-renewal advocate Edmund Bacon, who pointed to its landmark status and its location within the Market Street East Redevelopment Area. This urban-renewal zone stretched along Market Street from City Hall to 6th Street.

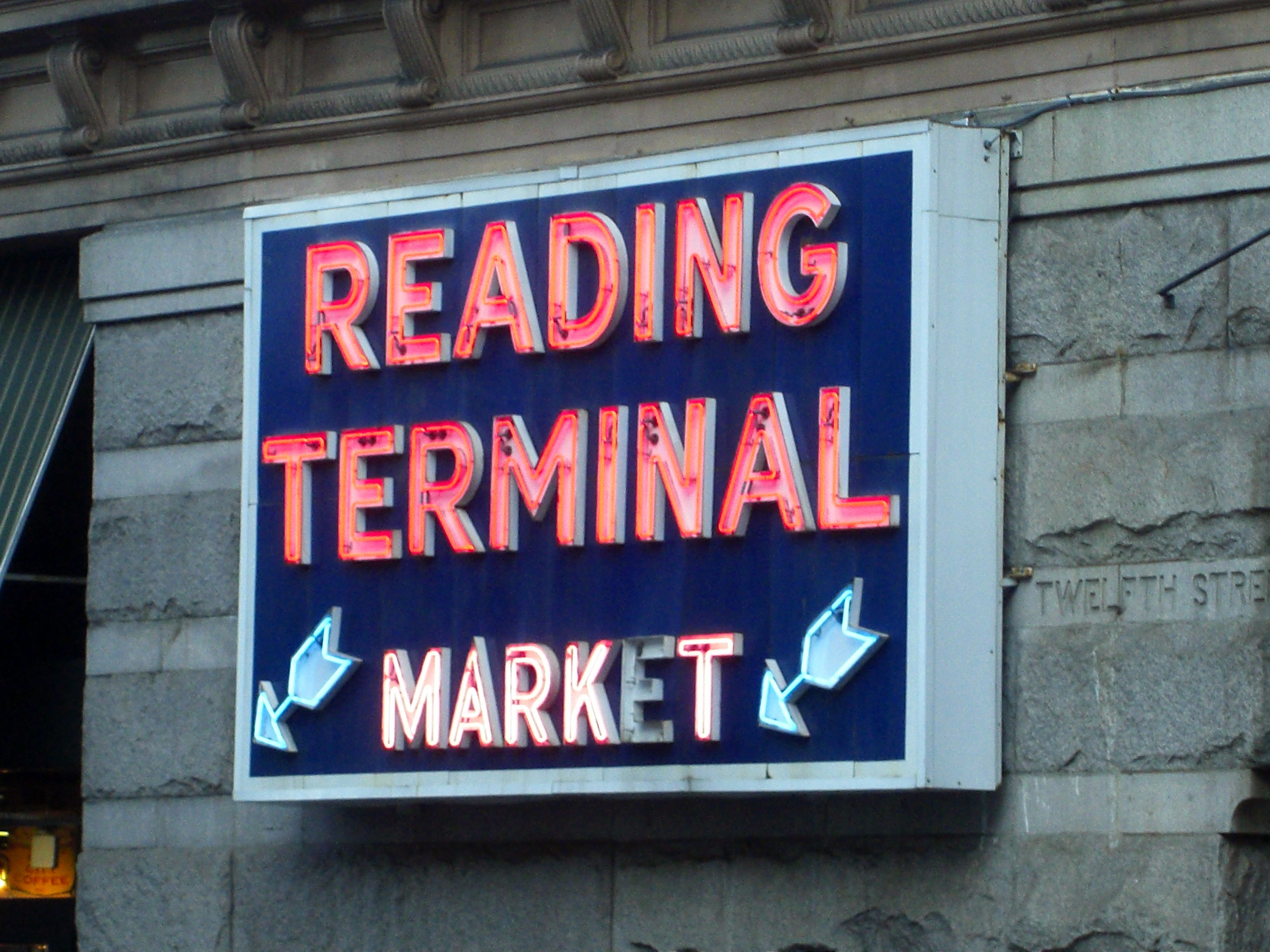
Reading Terminal Market sign

In 1993, the complex was chosen from among four candidates as the site for the new Pennsylvania Convention Center and purchased by the city's Redevelopment Authority of Philadelphia. After renovations completed in 1997, designed by BLT Architects in a joint venture with CLA, the headhouse became the center's main entrance, while the trainshed became its Grand Hall and ballroom, with meeting rooms and a hallway. Originally built to accommodate the offices of the Philadelphia and Reading Railroad, this historic railroad facility (designed by the Wilson brothers, prominent 19th century architects and engineers) is the linchpin of Philadelphia's burgeoning commercial district east of City Hall.

Now renovated and remodeled street and concourse levels of the 175,000 sq ft (16,300 m^{2}) building accommodate a variety of retail and food service operations. The remaining space on the concourse levels of the headhouse became retail space. The former Reading Railroad offices on the headhouse's upper floors were converted to meeting and ballroom facilities. It also contains more than 200 rooms for the adjacent Marriott Hotel, to which it is connected by a skywalk and for which it serves as a secondary entrance.

The Reading Terminal Market was spun off under its own control. A nonprofit corporation was formed in 1994 to manage the market.

== In film ==
Several films have had scenes shot at the terminal, including the 1981 Brian De Palma film Blow Out, the 1995 film Twelve Monkeys, and the 2004 film National Treasure.

== Gallery ==
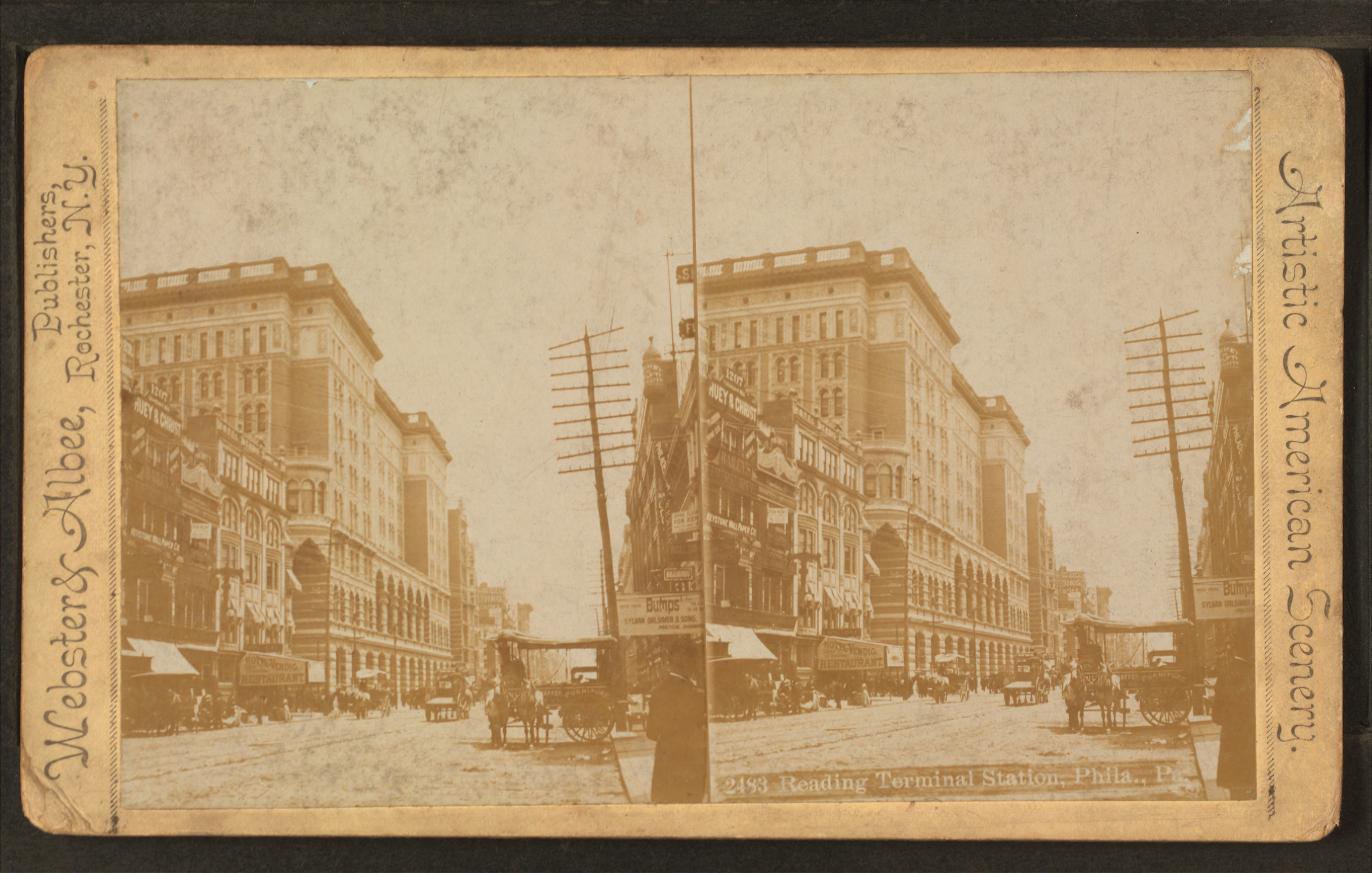
Stereoscopic view of the Headhouse

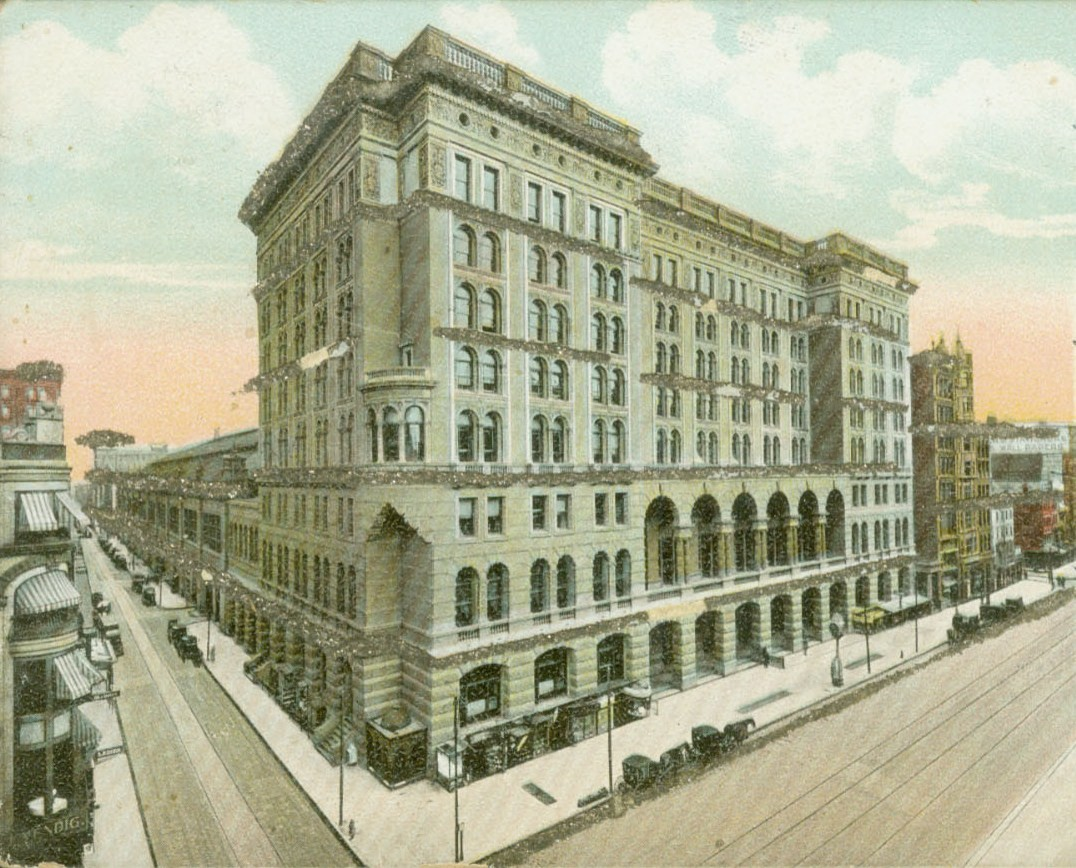
Reading Terminal postcard, 1906

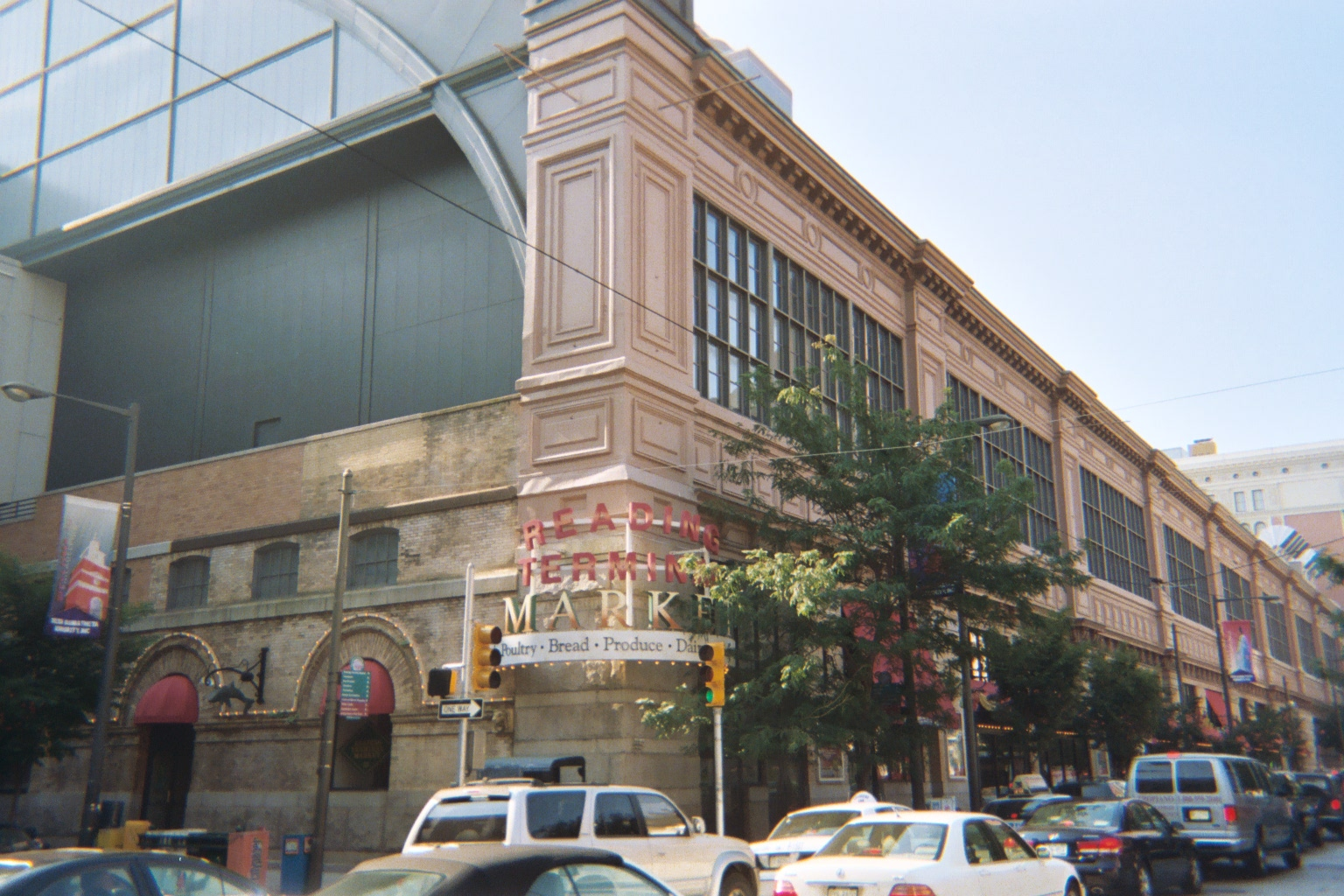
Reading Terminal Market, SE corner 12th & Arch Sts., under the Trainshed

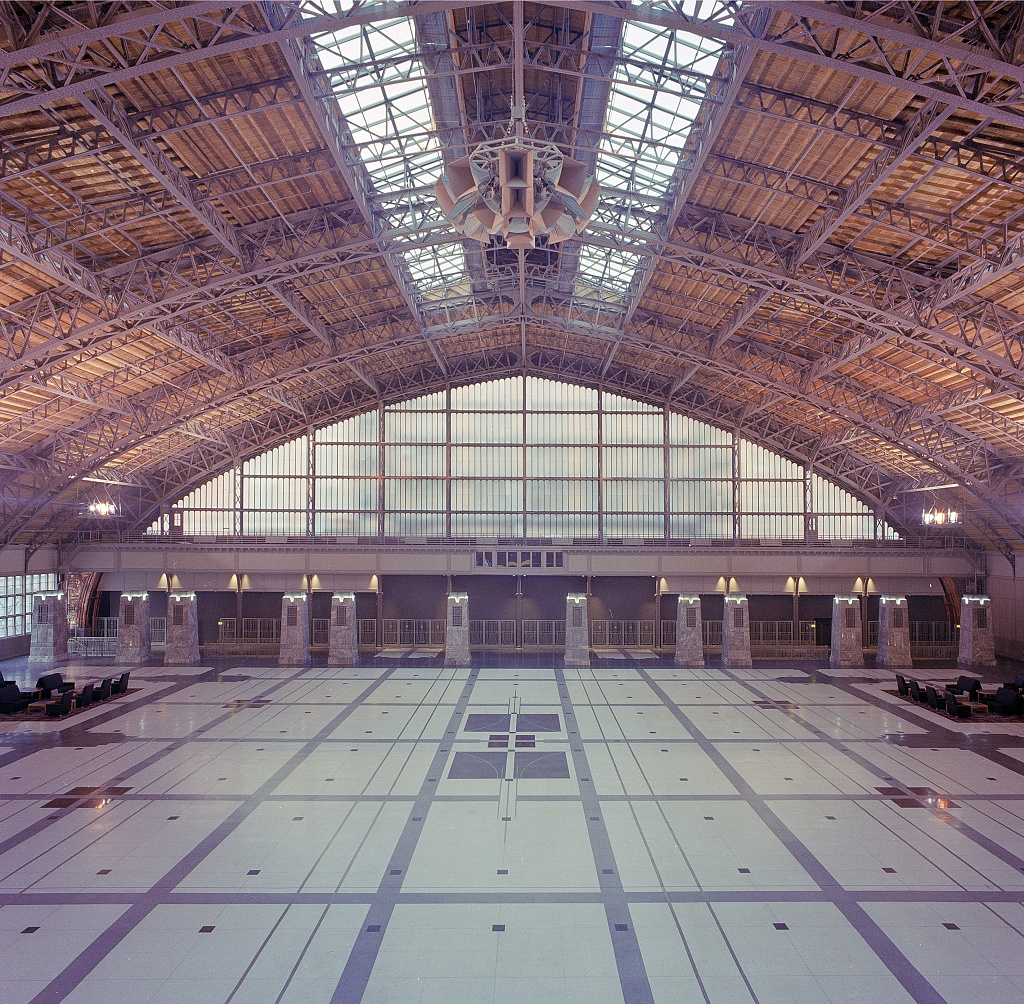
Pennsylvania Convention Center Grand Hall, 1993 occupies the former train shed.

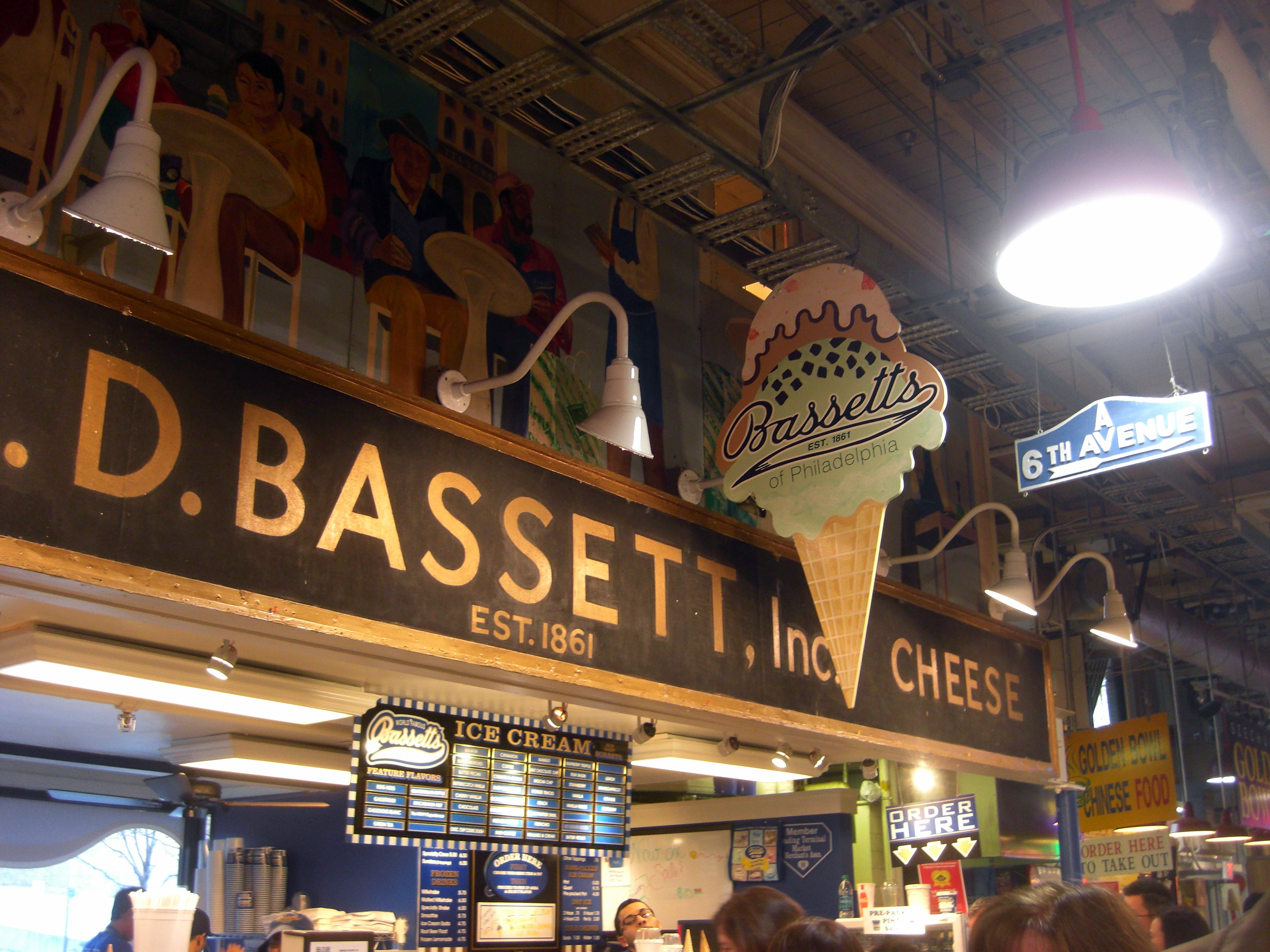
Bassett's Ice Cream stand in the market

== See also ==
- Baltimore & Ohio Railroad station (Philadelphia)
- 30th Street Station
- Broad Street Station (Philadelphia)
- Suburban Station
- List of National Historic Landmarks in Philadelphia
- National Register of Historic Places listings in Center City, Philadelphia
