= Center City Commuter Connection =

Railway tunnel in Center City Philadelphia

Coordinates: 39.953655°N 75.166566°W

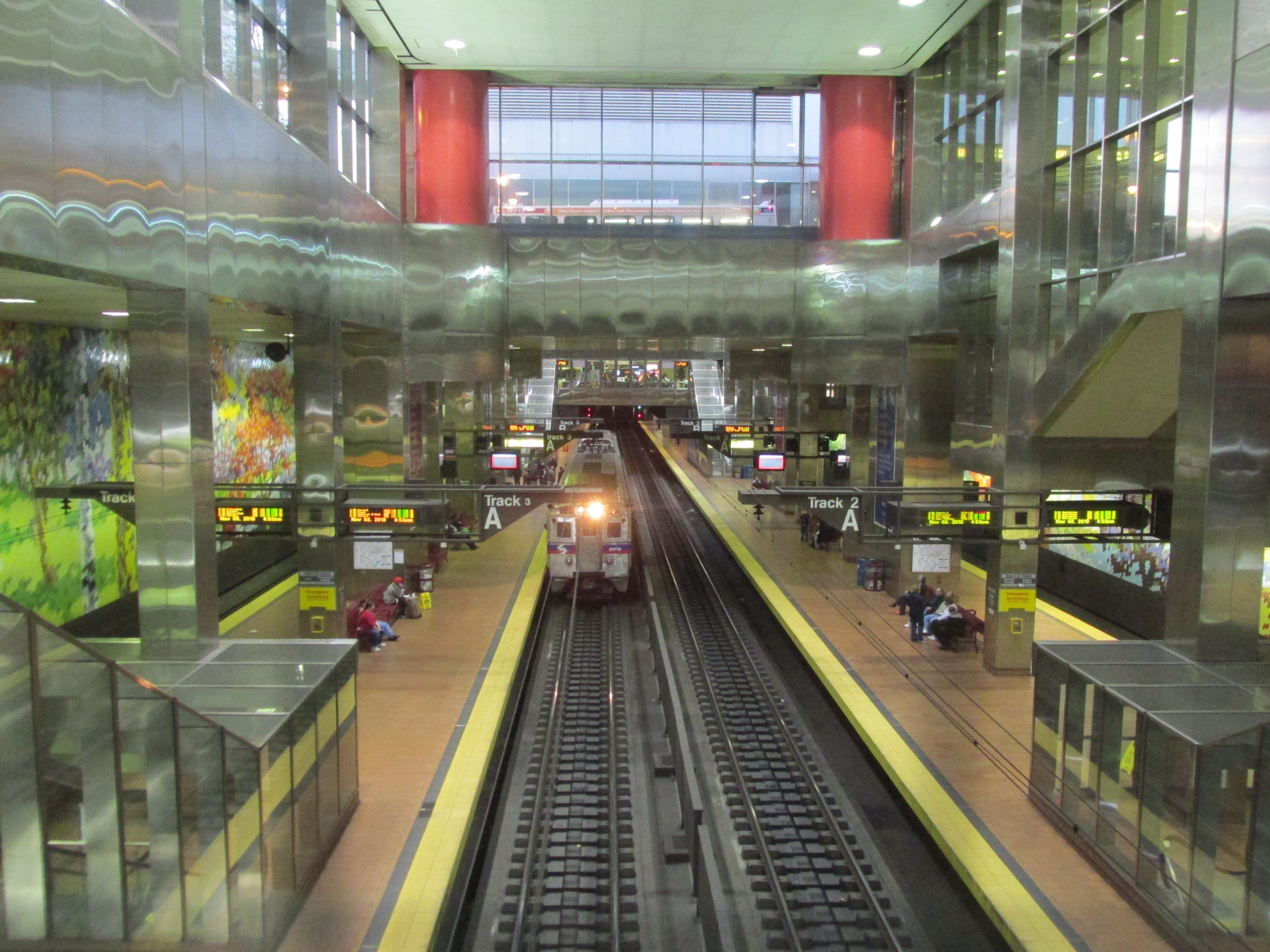
- Train emerging from the Center City Commuter Connection at Jefferson Station

Overview
- Location: Philadelphia, Pennsylvania, U.S.
- System: SEPTA Regional Rail
- Start: Suburban Station, Walnut–Locust station
- End: Portal near 8th and Spring Garden Streets
- No. of stations: 2

Operation
- Work began: June 22, 1978
- Constructed: 1978–1984
- Opened: November 12, 1984
- Operator: SEPTA
- Traffic: Rail
- Character: Passenger

Technical
- Length: 1.8 mi (2.9 km)
- No. of tracks: 4
- Track gauge: 4 ft 8 1/2 in (1,435 mm) standard gauge
- Electrified: Overhead line, 12 kV 25 Hz AC
- Operating speed: 40 mph (64 km/h)

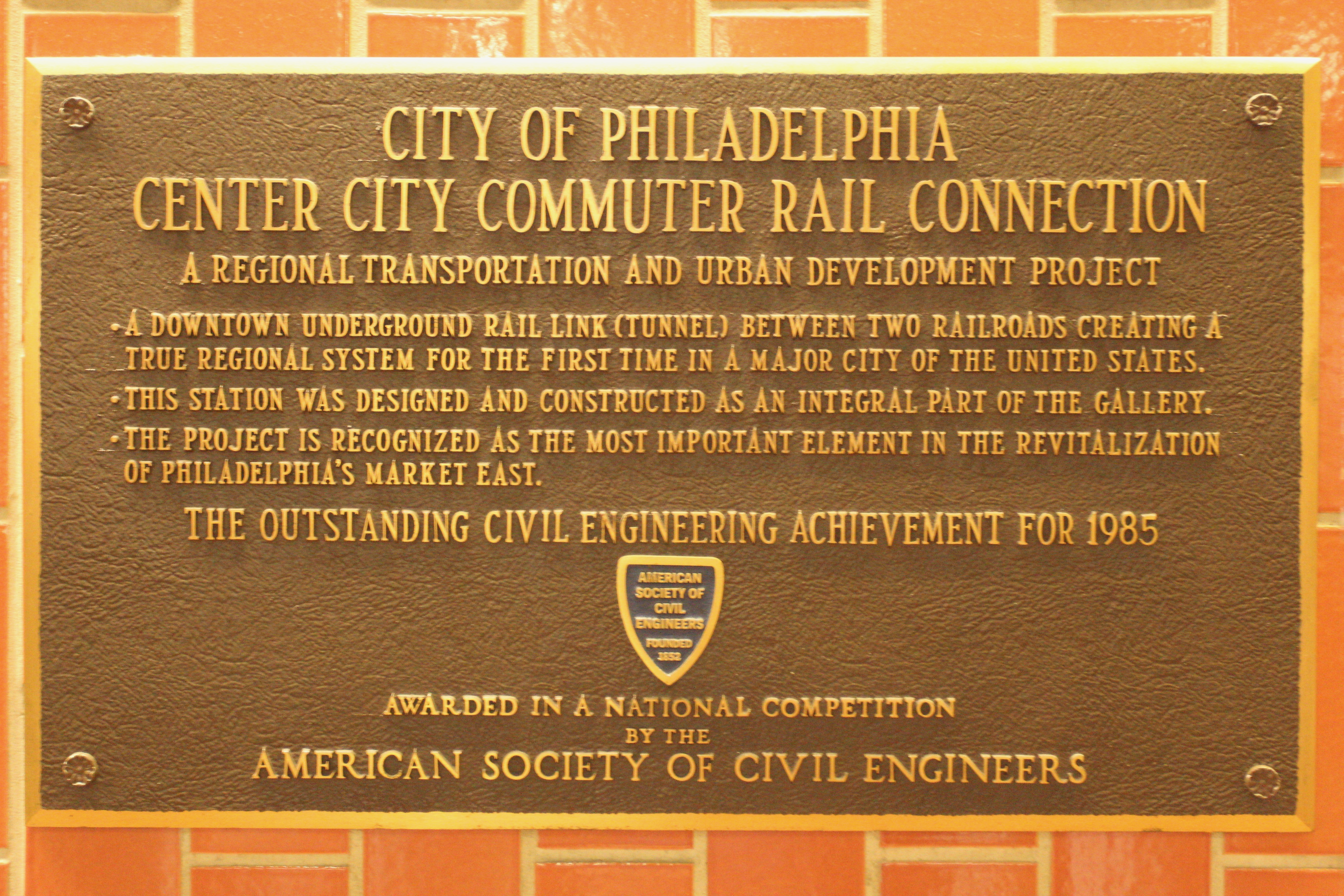
The ASCE plaque in Jefferson Station

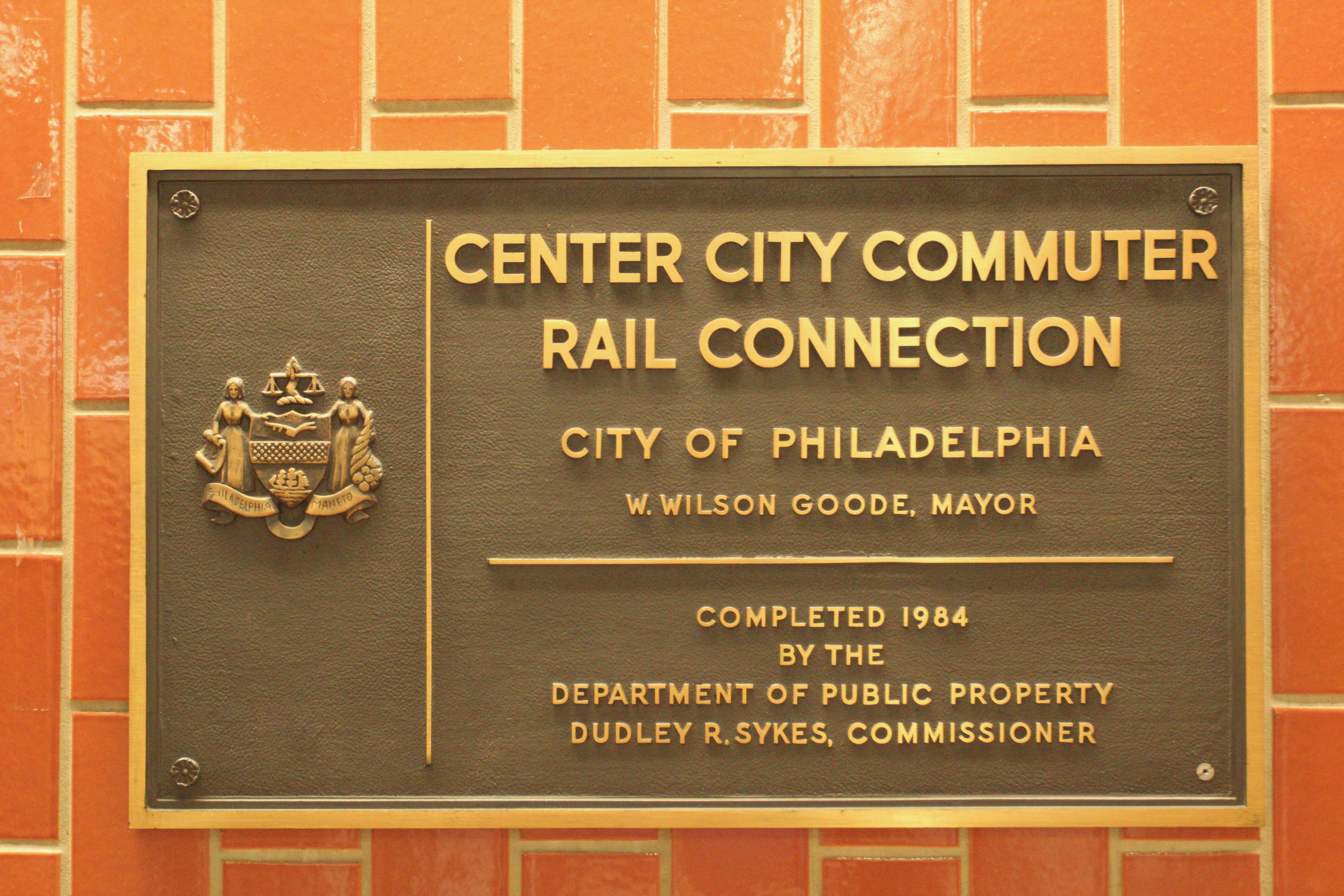
City plaque in Jefferson Station

The Center City Commuter Connection (CCCC), commonly referred to as "the commuter tunnel", is a passenger railroad tunnel in Center City Philadelphia, Pennsylvania. The tunnel was built to connect the stub ends of the two separate regional commuter rail systems, which were originally operated by the Pennsylvania Railroad and the Reading Company, two rival rail companies.

All of the SEPTA Regional Rail lines except for the Cynwyd Line pass completely through the four-track tunnel, which contains two underground stations, Suburban Station and Jefferson Station, and the above-ground upper-level concourse for the east–west commuter lines serving 30th Street Station.

== Planning and development ==
Suburban Station, located at 16th Street and JFK Boulevard, was the underground terminus of the commuter rail lines of the Pennsylvania Railroad (PRR). The Reading Company (RDG) ran trains on an elevated approach above city streets into the Reading Terminal, located at 12th and Market Streets (one block west of where Jefferson Station was built). The connection, the first of its kind in the United States, was built to allow trains to run through Philadelphia's downtown central business district, by uniting the commuter lines of the two rail systems.

R. Damon Childs was a junior land planner with the Philadelphia City Planning Commission when he proposed the CCCC to permit through-routing of the Pennsylvania Railroad and the Reading Railroad suburban lines. There already was a 0.8-mile (1.3 km) subway from 16th Street to 20th Street, a portion of the trackage connecting Suburban Station with 30th Street Station to the west. The tunnel project extended four of Suburban Station's eight tracks 1.7 miles (2.7 km) eastward. The proposed tunnel addition would pass just north of City Hall and then pass over the Broad Street Subway. The tracks would run under Filbert Street, would then curve to the north after 11th Street, pass under the Ridge Avenue Subway spur line, and run northward under 9th Street, ascending to join the Reading embankment near Spring Garden Street. Underground replacement for Reading Terminal—originally to be called 11th Street Station—was part of the Market East redevelopment project. At first the idea seemed preposterous because it required excavation under Philadelphia City Hall, one of the most massive buildings in the world, but it was nevertheless incorporated by Edmund N. Bacon into the city's 1960 Comprehensive Plan.

Groundbreaking for the tunnel project was on June 22, 1978. It took six years to complete at a cost of $330 million (equivalent to $1.6 billion in 2025). Federal funds, through the Federal Transit Administration (then called the Urban Mass Transportation Administration), paid for 80 percent of the project, state funds accounted for 16.66 percent, and city funds covered the remaining 3.33 percent. On April 28, 1984, a free shuttle service began operating between Suburban Station and Market East Station. Trains on the former PRR lines began providing service through the connection to and from Market East on September 3, 1984. The last train from Reading Terminal departed on November 6, 1984. After allowing for final track connections to be made, trains from the former Reading Railroad began using the tunnel on November 10, 1984. The Center City Commuter Connection, the four-track (two tracks in both directions) standard-gauge rail link between Suburban Station and the new Market East Station, formally opened for business on November 12, 1984. The old approach to Reading Terminal was then abandoned. It is still mostly present, and is now known as the Reading Viaduct, being actively converted to a linear park (Phase 1 opened in 2018). The new 11th St has two platforms which are 850 feet (260 m) long and 35 feet (11 m) wide.

Bernard Goldentyer was the CCCC Project Manager for the City of Philadelphia, making him responsible for coordinating the efforts over a dozen different contracts totaling over $250 million. The key to the project was supporting and underpinning Reading Terminal which is a historic structure and keeping all the utilities, including phone lines, in Center City intact while the project was done. In a nod to Chinatown for tolerating the construction, artisans and masons were brought in from China to create the Chinatown Arch.

Approximately 22 trains per hour run per track as of 2014.

== See also ==
- North–South Rail Link, a set of proposals for a similar project in Boston
- Oslo Tunnel, a similar project in Oslo, Norway
- Regional Connector, a similar project for a light rail tunnel in Los Angeles
