= Pottsville station =

Railroad station in Pennsylvania, US

Pottsville
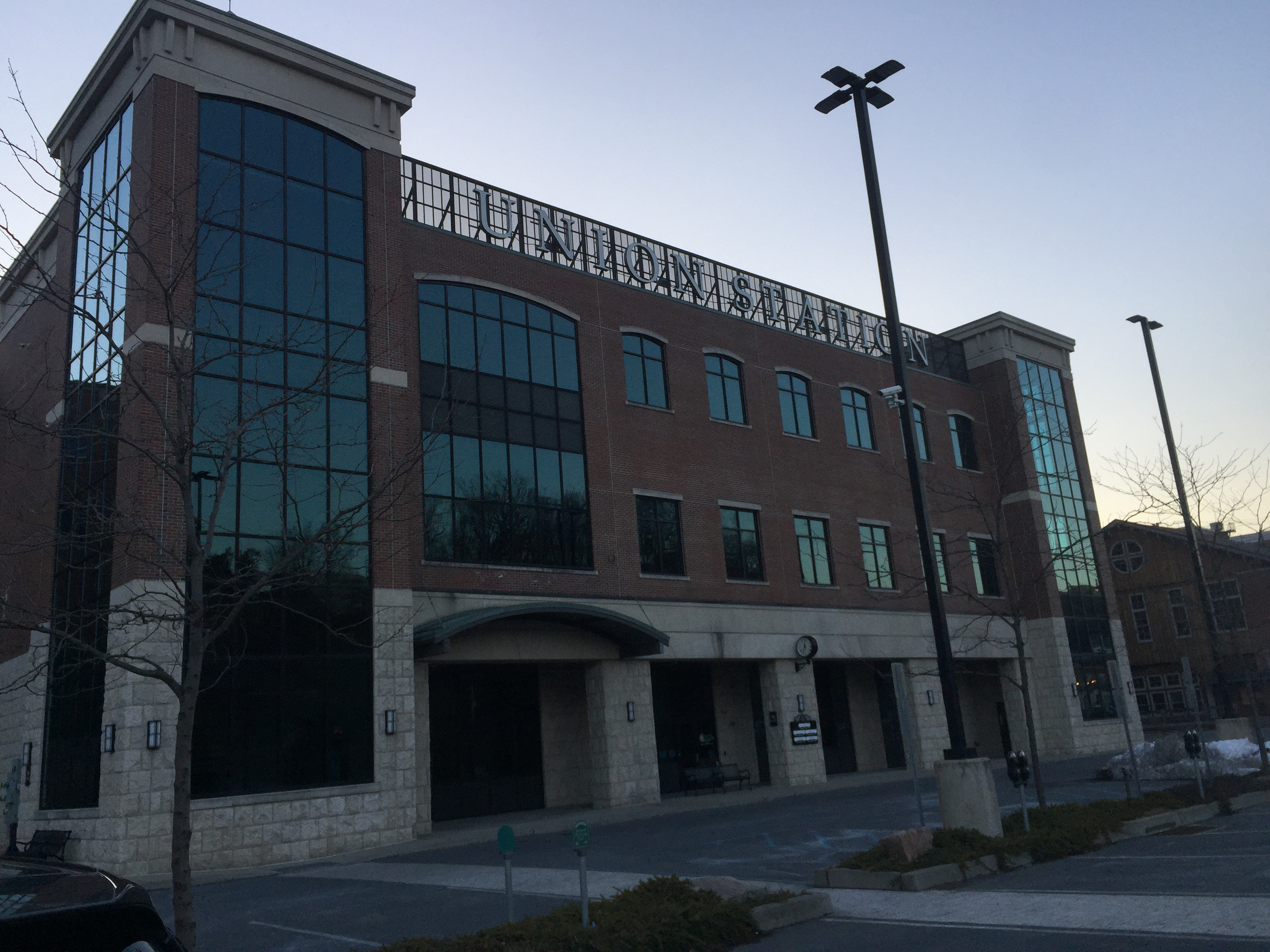
- Pottsville station in 2018

General information
- Location: 300 South Center Street, Pottsville, Pennsylvania
- Coordinates: 40.6833°N 76.1929°W
- System: Former SEPTA regional rail station
- Owner: Reading Blue Mountain and Northern Railroad (heritage railway)
- Platforms: 1 side platform
- Tracks: 2
- Connections: Schuylkill Transportation System

Construction
- Accessible: No

History
- Closed: June 30, 1981

Former services
Preceding station	SEPTA	Following station
Terminus	Pottsville Line	Schuylkill Haven toward Reading Terminal
Preceding station	Reading Railroad	Following station
Terminus	Main Line	Connor toward Philadelphia
Terminus	Schuylkill Valley Branch	Palo Alto toward Tamaqua
Location

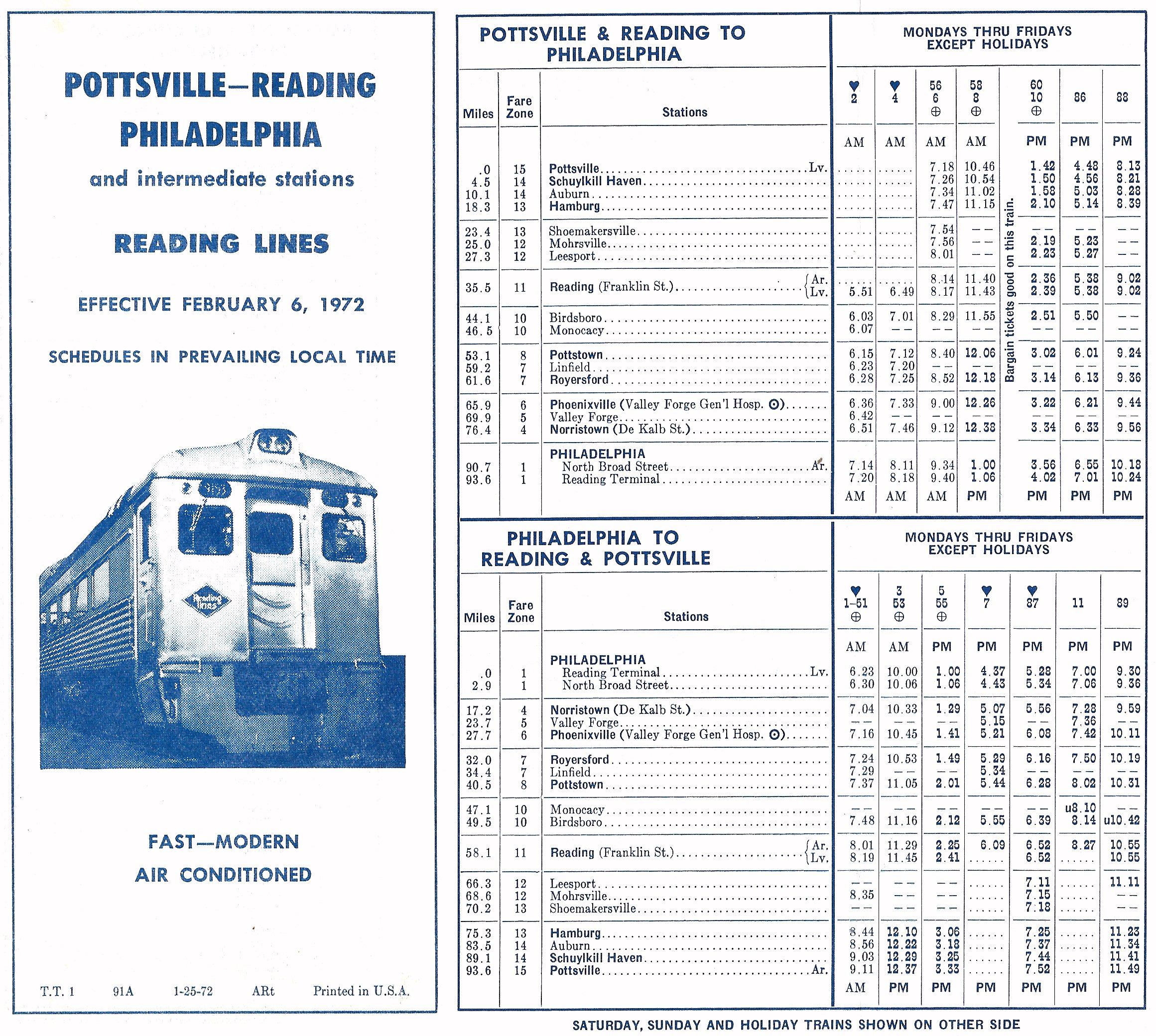
Passenger Timetable (eff. 1972-02-06) of a predecessor to SEPTA diesel service on Reading Lines between Pottsville, Penn. via Reading, Penn. to Philadelphia

The Pottsville station, also known as Union Station Intermodal Transit Center, is a transit station in Pottsville, Pennsylvania. Located next to the original Reading Railroad station, it currently houses bus service, SEDCO, the Schuylkill Chamber of Commerce and occasional train service by the Reading Blue Mountain & Northern Railroad.

The original station was originally built by the Reading Railroad, and later served the SEPTA diesel service line extending from the Norristown section of the Manayunk/Norristown Line. It shut down in 1981, when SEPTA cancelled the diesel service. The city built the building to serve the Schuylkill Transportation System and the visitors bureau, as well as occasional train service. In 2013, the Reading Blue Mountain and Northern Railroad began hosting further recreational train trips to the Reading Outer Station in Reading, Pennsylvania.
