= Wissahickon =

Wissahickon may refer to the following in the U.S. state of Pennsylvania:

- Wissahickon, Philadelphia, a section or neighborhood of Philadelphia
- Wissahickon Creek, a tributary of the Schuylkill River
  - Wissahickon Memorial Bridge, spans the above creek in Philadelphia
  - Wissahickon Trail, a suburban trail
- Wissahickon Formation, a mapped bedrock unit in Pennsylvania, New Jersey, and Delaware
- Wissahickon High School, in the borough of Ambler
- Wissahickon (house), a historic apartment building in Philadelphia
- Wissahickon School District, in Montgomery County
- Wissahickon (SEPTA station), a passenger rail station in Northwest Philadelphia
  - Wissahickon Transportation Center, a bus station next to the rail station
- Wissahickon Skating Club, a non-profit skating club in the Chestnut Hill section of Philadelphia
- Wissahickon Valley Park, formerly part of Fairmount Park in Philadelphia
- USRC Wissahickon (1904), one of two Winnisimmet-class harbor tugs
- Saul High School of Agricultural Sciences, formerly known as the Wissahickon Farm School

== See also ==
- USS Wissahickon, disambiguation
