= SEPTA Route 35 =

Route 35

Overview
- System: Midvale District
- Operator: SEPTA City Transit Division
- Began service: 13 December 1931
- Former operator: Philadelphia Transportation Company

Route
- Locale: Philadelphia
- Communities served: Roxborough/Manayunk
- Start: Wissahickon Transportation Center
- Via: Main Street, Ridge Avenue, and Leverington Street
- End: Ridge Avenue and Domino Lane
- Length: 7.6 miles (12.2 km)

Service
- Frequency: 45 minutes (6:00a–6:30p)
- Weekend frequency: 45 minutes (8:00a–6:30p)
- Timetable: Route 35 schedule

Route 35 was a bus route operated by the SEPTA in Philadelphia, Pennsylvania, United States.

== Route description ==
Starting at the Wissahickon Transportation Center, the route travels west on Main Street, then follows a large clockwise loop via Umbria Street, Ridge Avenue, Roxborough Avenue, Manayunk Avenue and Leverington Avenue back to Main and thence to its start.

== History ==
=== Streetcar service ===
The first Route 35 was a streetcar line that ran between West Philadelphia and Fairmount Park via 49th Street, 52nd Street, and Parkside Avenue. It was replaced by Routes 38A and 70 in 1929.

=== Bus service ===
Originally designated Route Z, service began on December 13, 1931, replacing the Chestnut Hill–Norristown Railway Company's trolley service on Main Street between Ridge Avenue and Levering Street in Roxborough. On February 1, 1942, the route was extended three miles east to Erie station on the Broad Street Line. On June 18, 1961, this extension was cut back to Wissahickon Loop. Two years later, on April 14, 1963, Route 35 was restructured as the "Roxborough-Manayunk Loop", running in a clockwise loop between Ridge Avenue & Fountain Street and Main Street & Green Lane. On October 8, 1967, Route Z was renumbered Route 35.

After being a circular service for over twenty years, on June 7, 1998, the 35 returned to Wissahickon Loop. On September 1, 2002, Route 35 was extended into Andorra, allowing more service in this neighborhood to be provided by smaller buses. (See Route 9.) Between November 12, 2006, and June 19, 2011, the route was renamed the Manayunk Roxborough Loop and once more withdrawn from Wissahickon Loop. From June 19, 2011, the route returned to Wissahickon which remains – in rebuilt form as the Wissahickon Transportation Center – the route's terminus.

On March 23, 2023, SEPTA released a new draft plan for Bus Revolution, SEPTA's bus network redesign. As part of the plan, Route 35 would be consolidated into other routes. On August 23, 2026, Route 35 was planned to end operations alongside six other routes as a part of the bus redesign plan.
