= Roxborough, Philadelphia =

Roxborough
- Neighborhood
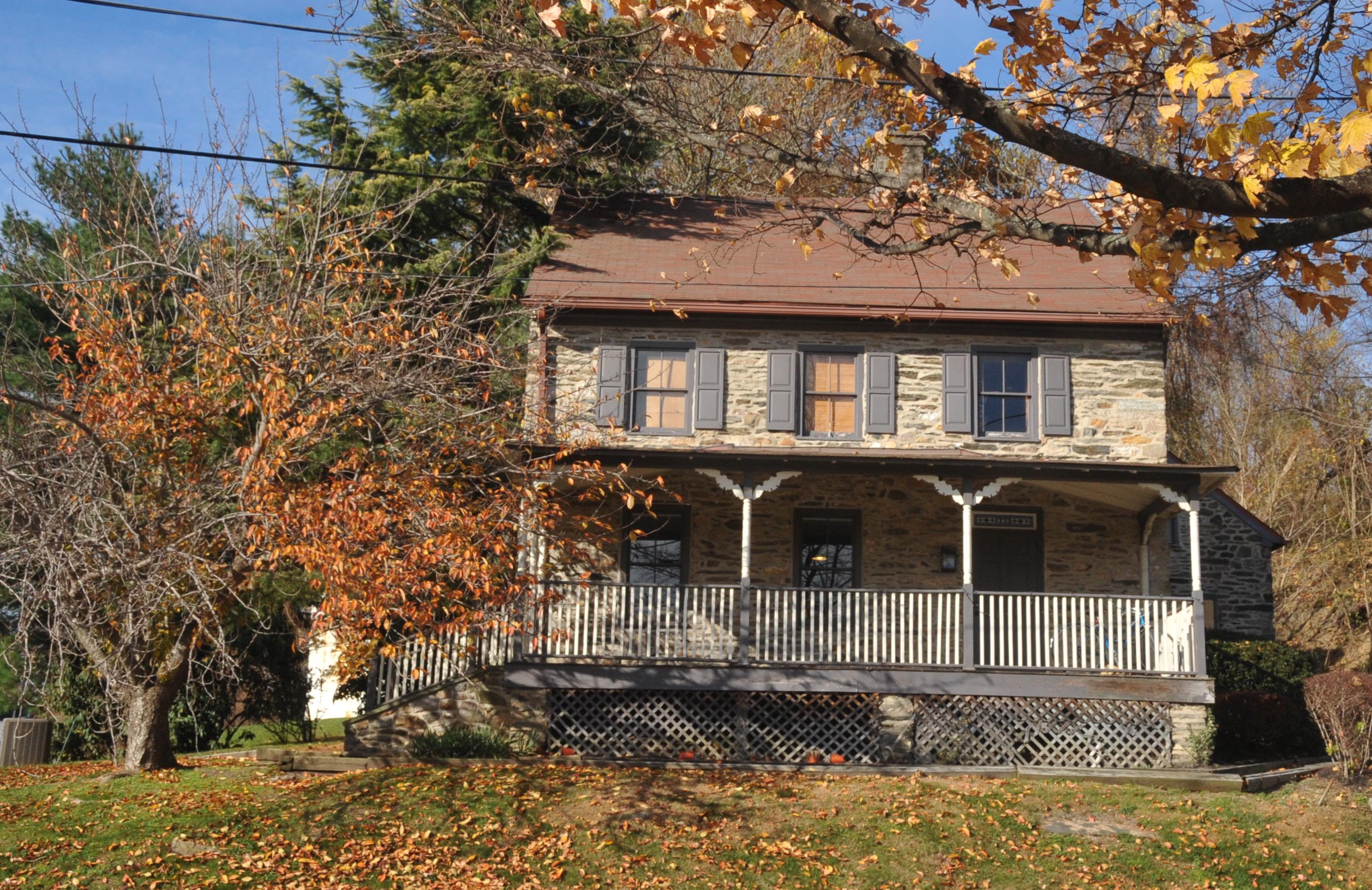
- Miquon House; Motto: "A Place With Roots"

- Location within Philadelphia
- Coordinates: 40°03′14″N 75°14′31″W
- Country: United States
- State: Pennsylvania
- County: Philadelphia
- City: Philadelphia

Population
  - Total: 30,940
- ZIP Code: 19128
- Area codes: 215, 267 and 445

Roxborough is a neighborhood in Northwest Philadelphia, Pennsylvania, United States. It is bordered to the southwest, along the Schuylkill River, by the neighborhood of Manayunk, along the northeast by the Wissahickon Creek section of Fairmount Park, and to the southeast by the neighborhood of East Falls. Beyond Roxborough to the northwest is Montgomery County. Roxborough's ZIP Code is 19128. Most of Roxborough is in Philadelphia's 21st Ward.

== Etymology ==
=== Andrew Robeson and Roxburgh, Scotland ===
The area of present-day Roxborough was likely named for Roxburghshire in Scotland, the original home of Andrew Robeson, one of the first settlers of the area.

In 1676, Andrew Robeson, his wife Elizabeth, and his nephew Andrew Jr. came to America from Scotland, where Andrew Sr. became surveyor general for 300,000 acres of land in southern New Jersey and presided as a judge in Gloucester County. In 1690, Andrew Sr. moved to Philadelphia, where he purchased an estate in present-day Roxborough, roughly where the on and off ramps for City Line Avenue and Lincoln Drive are currently located.

Andrew Jr. became chief of justice in the Province of Pennsylvania from 1693 until 1699. He was responsible for making Roxborough a township in 1690.

The Robeson family is known to have originally come from Kelso, Roxburghshire, Scotland. Roxburgh (pronounced Rocs-burr-ah) was a small region in the southeast of Scotland until it was changed to the region of "The Borders" in 1975; the town of Kelso still remains as a historic Scottish village.

=== Rocksburrow ===
In 1706, a German philosopher named Johannes Kelpius, who lived in the woods not far from the Robesons, wrote about "foxes burrowing in rocks" in the area. A correlation between the phonetic spelling "Rocksburrow" that many resident Germans applied to the Township, and Kelpius's "where foxes burrow" letter of 1706, convinced many that the township's origins related to foxes.

Kelpius popularized his spelling of the township, but not long afterward the spelling was changed to its current form.

The Township could have retained the names "Manatawna" or "Leverington", as they were popular names the area was referred to as in the 1690s and early 1700s, but thanks to the popular writings of Johannes Kelpius, the name remained as Roxborough. Other spellings have also been noted in early writings as Roxbury and Roxboro.

== History ==
Roxborough Township
- Former township
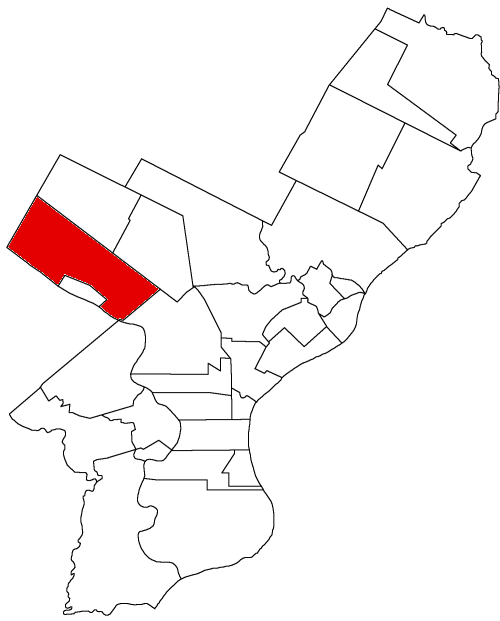
- Map of Philadelphia County, Pennsylvania highlighting Roxborough Township prior to the Act of Consolidation, 1854
- Coordinates: 40°02′49″N 75°14′28″W

The Native American trail called the Manatawny, now Ridge Avenue, was central to the well-organized development of farms and plantations within the area then known as Manatawna. The Court of Upland in England appointed local Swedish settler Peter Rambo to be the maintainer of the Manatawny road. In 1690, the road was renamed Ridge Road (it follows the crest of the ridge between the Wissahickon valley and the Schuylkill valley), and the area was renamed Roxburgh, likely named for Roxburghshire, Scotland, the ancestral home of Andrew Robeson, one of the earliest settlers of the area.

=== 18th century ===
By 1707, the name had been changed to Roxborough. Roxborough is first mentioned as a township in QS Road Docket II: 31 in 1706. In 1840, Manayunk was erected as a borough within the township, and on March 31, 1847, Manayunk was declared separate from the township.

=== 19th century ===
Most of modern-day Roxborough was once part of Roxborough Township, which was incorporated into the City of Philadelphia following the passage of the Act of Consolidation, 1854. At this time, Roxborough was the home of the area's wealthiest, the owners of the Manayunk mills. These textile mills produced revenue that was spent building schools, parks, and a large Victorian manor built for the area's elderly women, The Roxborough Home for Women.

=== 20th century ===
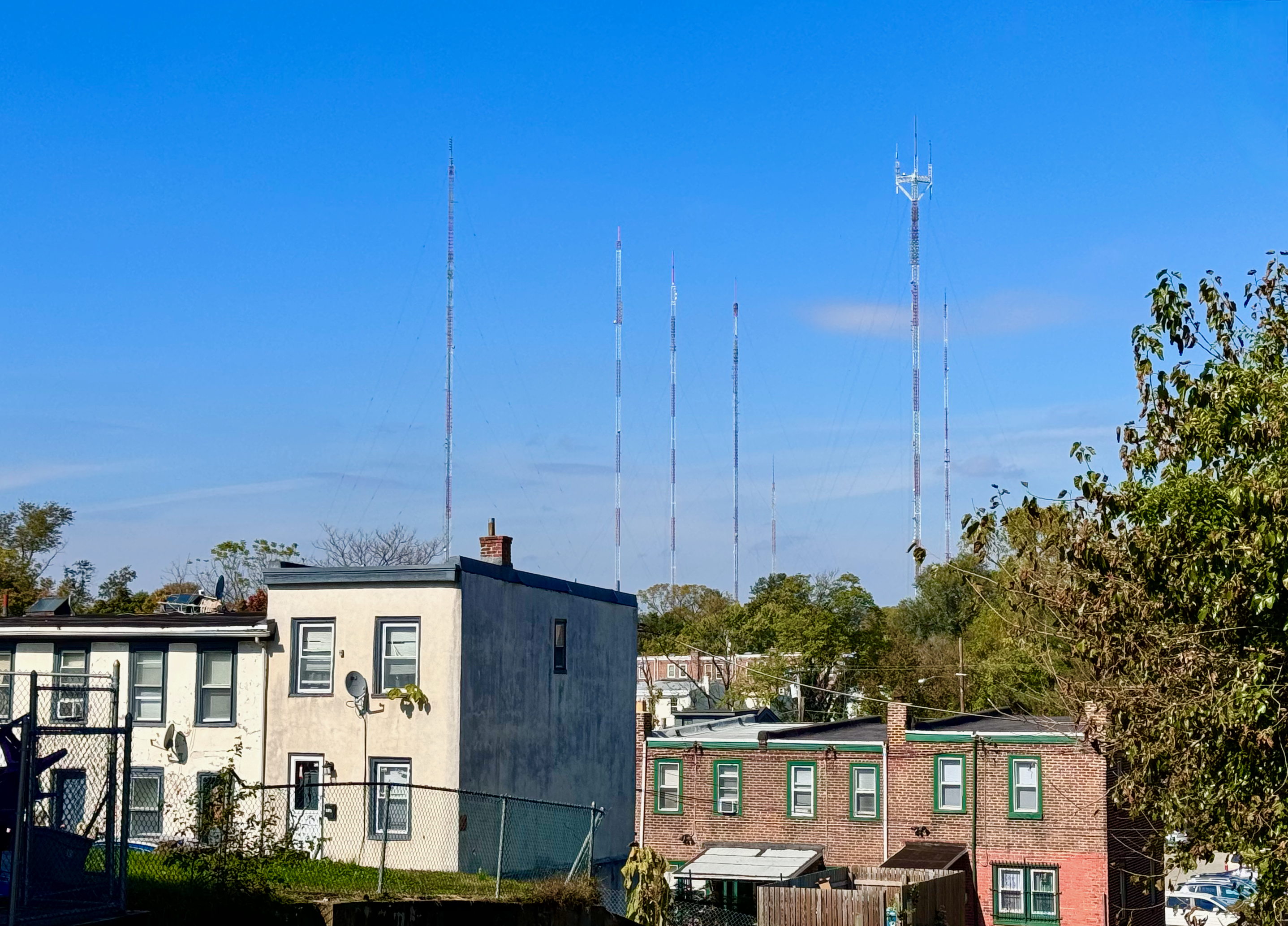
A radio and TV antenna tower farm in Roxborough

Since the 1950s, most of Philadelphia's major television and FM radio stations have located their transmission towers in Roxborough because of its hilly terrain and high elevation. The tallest of these towers, the American Tower, stands approximately 1,250 feet (381 m) tall. Public television station "MiND", once called "WYBE", was also formerly located in Upper Roxborough, close to neighboring Andorra.

The Upper Roxborough Historic District and William Levering School are listed on the National Register of Historic Places.

== Geography ==
Roxborough is well-connected to Center City Philadelphia with multiple bus routes and bike lanes reaching the river and downtown area of Philadelphia. SEPTA's Manayunk/Norristown Regional Rail line stops in the Wissahickon section of Roxborough, continues through Manayunk, and stops again at the Ivy Ridge station in Roxborough.

Philadelphia University and St. Joseph's University, both located in Philadelphia, are nearby.

Henry Avenue runs parallel to Ridge Avenue from the border of East Falls and North Philadelphia to Andorra, where it merges into Ridge Avenue. Constructed in the 1930s, it was extended in 1959 from Roxborough Avenue to Andorra, and includes several concrete arch bridges. One of these bridges, the Wissahickon Memorial Bridge, which crosses over the Wissahickon Creek and Lincoln Drive, includes a pair of box tunnels under the roadway designed to carry a never built extension of the Broad Street Subway into Roxborough.

Because of the Wissahickon Creek and the park that protects much of its watershed, Roxborough and Manayunk are physically separated from the rest of the city. Much of lower Roxborough, consisting of "row homes" and homes dating from the 19th and early 20th centuries, has a historic, urban character.

Roxborough abuts the Wissahickon Valley Park portion of the Fairmount Park system. The park's numerous trails are used by cyclists, runners, walkers, dog owners, and mountain bikers.

The northwest section of Roxborough is often considered a separate neighborhood called Upper Roxborough. Much of the development in this area occurred after 1950, and has a suburban character: larger front lawns, garages, and shopping centers.

== Education ==
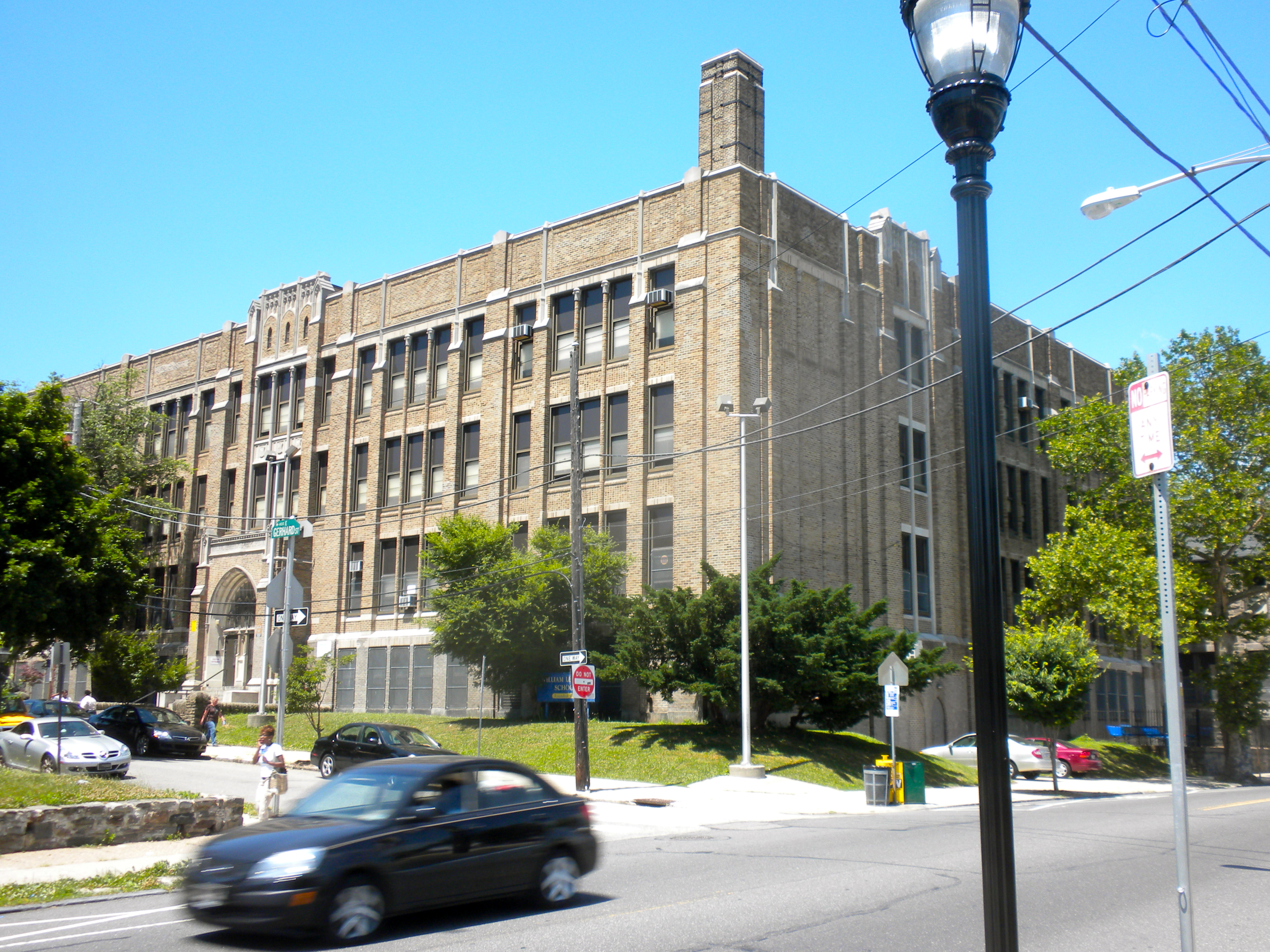
William Levering School in 2010

=== Primary and secondary schools ===
The School District of Philadelphia operates public schools. Its zoned schools include Shawmont Elementary, Cook Wissahickon, and Roxborough High School.

The Walter Biddle Saul High School of Agricultural Sciences and Lankenau Environmental Magnet High School are in upper Roxborough.

William Levering School, founded in 1748, closed in June 2012. The Academy for the Middle Years (AMY) Northwest Middle School, a special admissions middle school (6–8), now occupies the building. AMY used to be located in the Mount Airy section of Philadelphia, in a rented church building.

The area has been one of the main feeder regions for Roman Catholic and J.W. Hallahan High Schools.

=== Public libraries ===
The Free Library of Philadelphia operates the Roxborough Branch at 6245 Ridge Avenue at Hermitage Street. The "Roxborough - Manayunk - Wissahickon - East Falls - Andorra Historical Society" also has an archive room in the Roxborough Branch. It is maintained by one of the Historical Societies' top members and one of the area's community leaders, Sylvia Myers.

== Parks and recreation ==
- Wissahickon Valley Park
- Courtesy Stable, located in Wissahickon Valley Park
- Gorgas Park
- Kendrick Recreation Center
- Roxborough Pocket Park
- Schuylkill Center for Environmental Education
- Walnut Lane Golf Course
- Upper Roxborough Reservoir Preserve
- Al Pearlman Sports Complex
- Kelly Park
- Roxborough YMCA
- Houston Playground (Philadelphia Parks & Recreation)

== Transportation ==
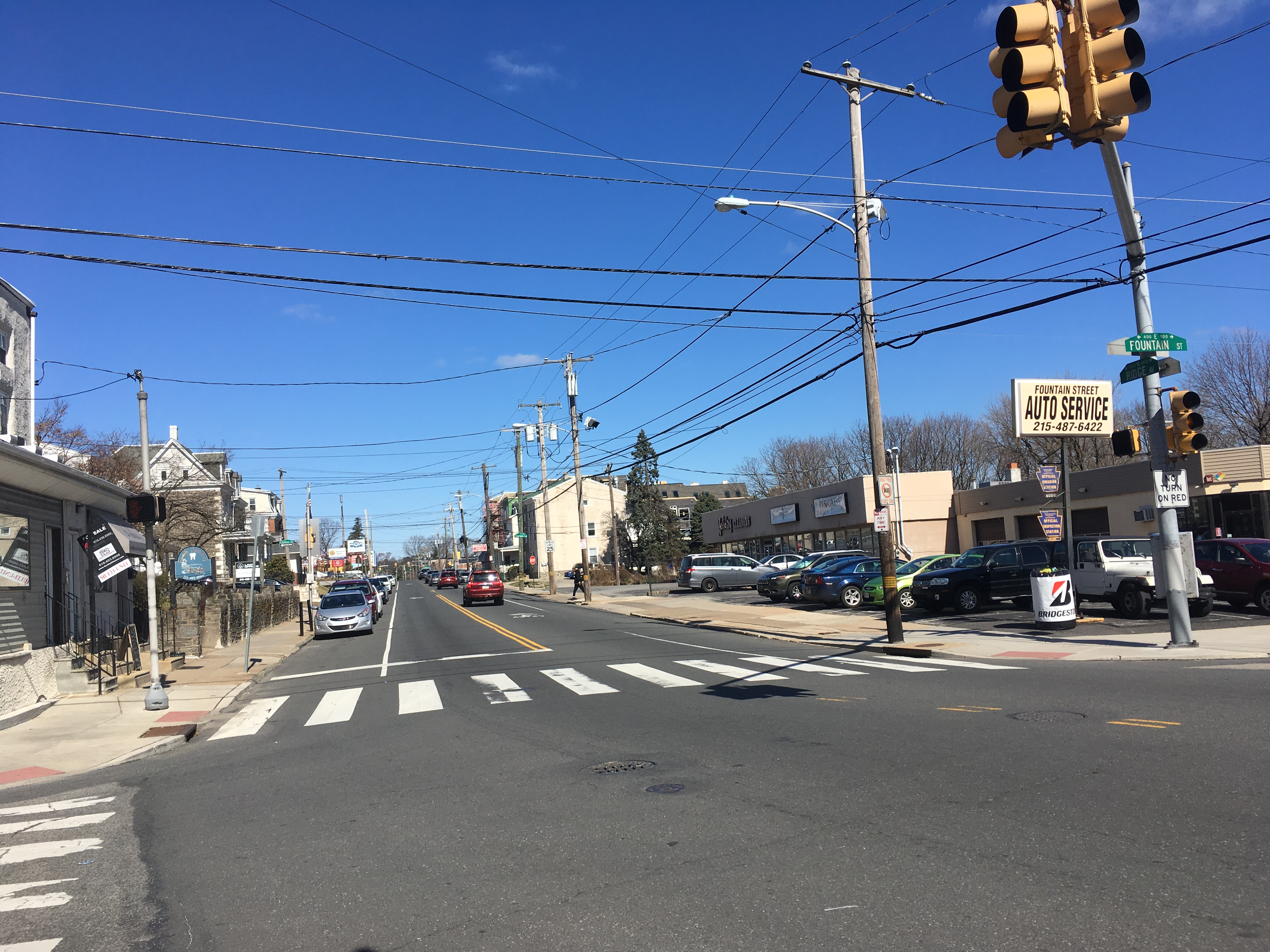
Ridge Avenue northbound past Fountain Street in 2019

One of the main and oldest thoroughfares through Roxborough is Ridge Avenue. Previously a Native American trail called the Manatawny, by the 18th century the trail was known as "Ridge Road," and by the 1730s, Ridge Road was popularized as “The Great Road from Philadelphia to Reading.” Passenger stagecoaches frequently traveled on the road, and many inns were built along it. Ridge Road even played a part during the American Revolution as various sections of the road were travelled by soldiers in 1777 during the lead-up to the Battle of Germantown.

The other main thoroughfare through Roxborough is Henry Avenue, which was laid out in the late 1950s as a four-lane road running the length of the neighborhood and parallel to Ridge Avenue.

The Manayunk/Norristown Line, a SEPTA Regional Rail line connecting the neighborhood to Center City, stops at Ivy Ridge station, Manayunk station, and Wissahickon station. SEPTA closed the historic Shawmont station in 1996.

The neighborhood is also served by SEPTA bus routes 1, 9, 27, 32, 35, and 65.

== Points of interest ==
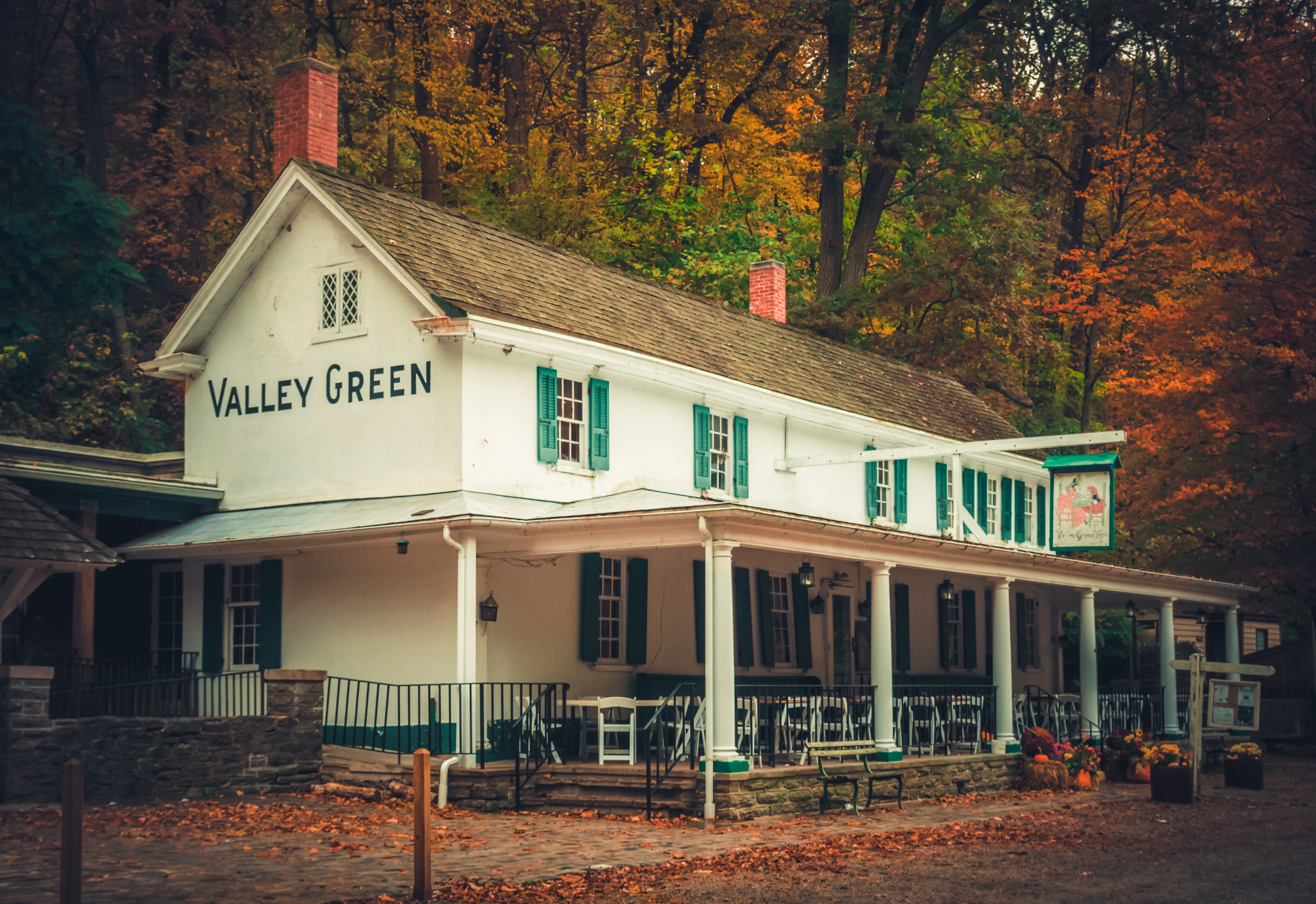
Valley Green Inn in Wissahickon Valley Park in 2013

- Dalessandro's Steaks, a notable cheesesteak eatery
- Church of St. Alban, Roxborough Episcopal church
- Leverington Cemetery, established in 1745
- Valley Green Inn, the last remaining roadhouse in Philadelphia

== Notable people ==
- William Bradford, former colonial-era printer and publisher
- Ted Bundy, serial killer
- John W. Lord Jr., former Pennsylvania state senator and federal judge
- Bobby McFerrin, singer, songwriter, and composer
