= AMY Northwest Middle School =

- William Levering School
- U.S. National Register of Historic Places
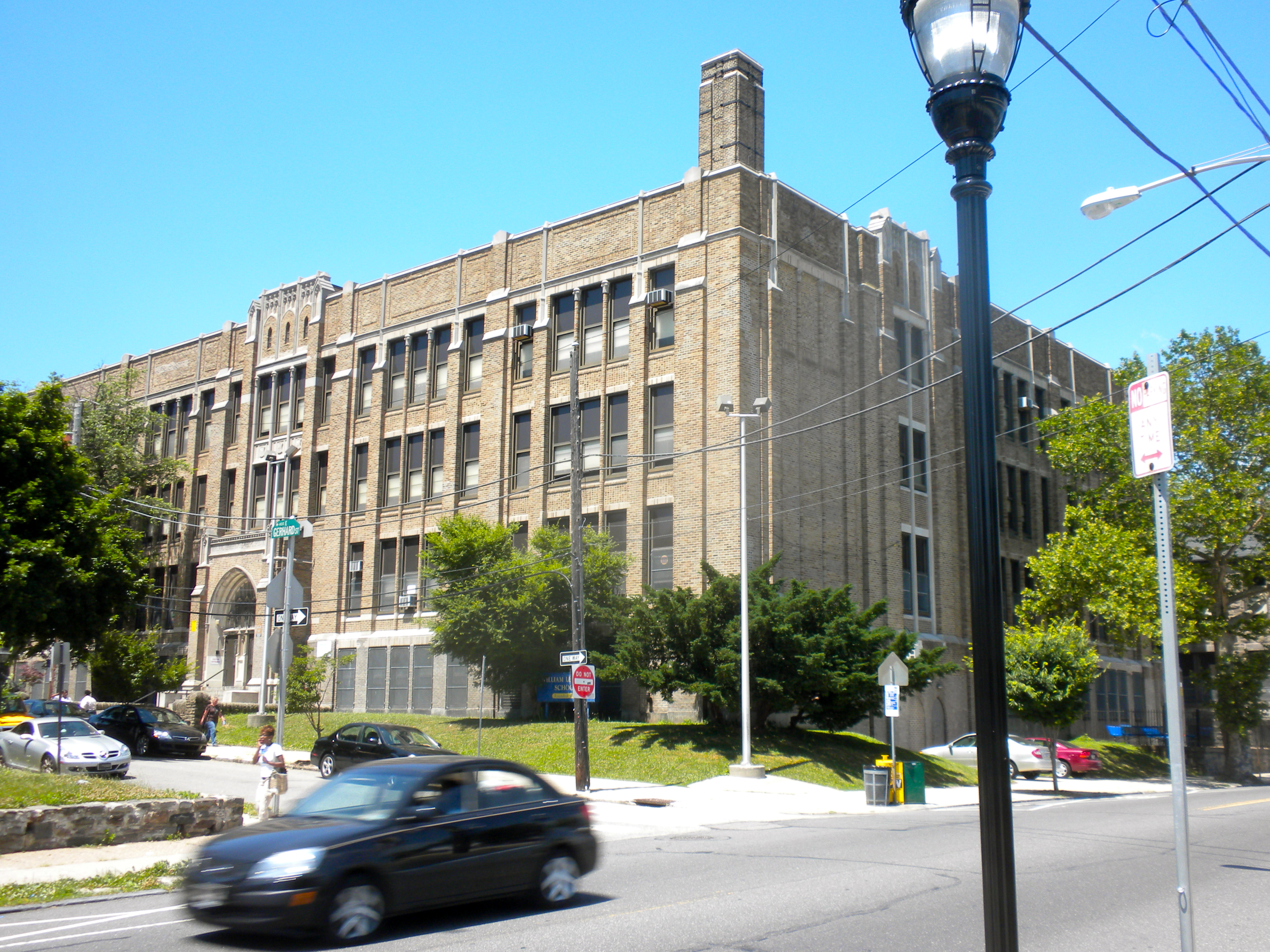
- William Levering School, June 2010

- Location within Philadelphia Location within Pennsylvania Location within the United States
- Location: 6000 Ridge Ave., Philadelphia, Pennsylvania, United States
- Coordinates: 40.0311°N 75.2130°W
- Area: 2.1 acres (0.85 ha)
- Built: 1894–1896, 1928–1929
- Architect: Joseph W. Anschutz, Irwin T. Catharine
- Architectural style: Colonial Revival, Art Deco
- MPS: Philadelphia Public Schools TR
- NRHP reference No.: 88002292
- Added to NRHP: November 18, 1988

The Academy for the Middle Years (AMY) Northwest Middle School, formerly the William Levering School, is a historic middle school located in the neighborhood of Roxborough, Philadelphia, Pennsylvania, United States. It is part of the School District of Philadelphia.

It was added to the National Register of Historic Places in 1988.

== History and architectural features ==
The school consists of two distinct buildings. The original section was built between 1894 and 1896, and is a two-and-one-half-story, five-bay, stone building with a hipped roofhich was designed in the Colonial Revival style. A three-story addition was built immediately to the south of the first building between 1928 and 1929. It is a brick and stone Art Deco-style building designed by Irwin T. Catharine.

In 2012, the School Reform Commission of the Philadelphia School District closed it as an elementary school; it then reopened as a selective admission middle school, AMY Northwest.
