= Lankenau Environmental Science Magnet High School =

Location
- 201 Spring Lane; Philadelphia, Pennsylvania 19128; United States; 40.062695°N 75.252796°W

Information
- Type: Magnet high school
- School district: The School District of Philadelphia
- Principal: Jessica Naugle McAtamney
- Grades: 9–12
- Enrollment: 340
- Student to teacher ratio: 16:1
- Website: lankenau.philasd.org

Lankenau Environmental Science Magnet High School (commonly referred as Lankenau High School) is a district-run magnet high school in Upper Roxborough, Northwest Philadelphia. It is a part of the School District of Philadelphia. The school's Advanced Placement participation was 34 percent during the 2014 school year. The school has also received a Bronze recognition by U.S. News & World Report's list of Best U.S. High Schools from 2012 through 2014.

The school is near the border with Montgomery County and occupies a wooded area. It described itself as the "country campus for the college bound".

== History ==
The school has a garden. In 2016 vandals damaged the garden with a vehicle.

== Demographics ==
Of the school's 340 students, 99 percent identify as minorities. 94.7 percent identify as Black, 3.6 percent as Hispanic, 1 percent as Other, 0.3 percent as Asian, and 0.3 percent as White.
