= Wissahickon, Philadelphia =

Wissahickon
- Neighborhood of Philadelphia
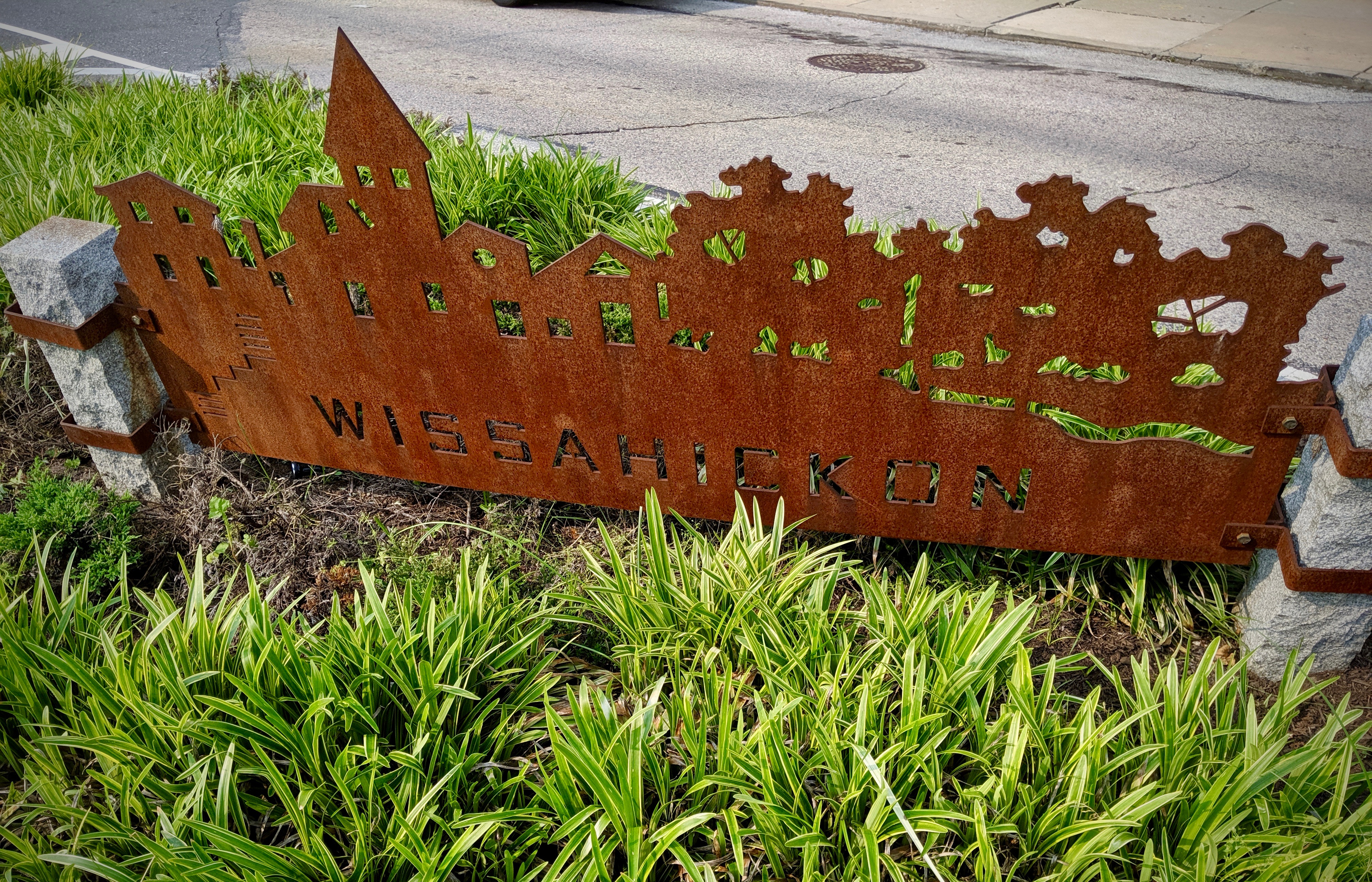
- Wissahickon neighborhood gateway sign

- Location within Philadelphia
- Country: United States
- State: Pennsylvania
- County: Philadelphia County
- City: Philadelphia
- Zipcode: 19128
- Area codes: 215, 267 and 445

Wissahickon is a neighborhood in the section of Lower Northwest Philadelphia in the state of Pennsylvania, United States. Wissahickon is located adjacent to the neighborhoods of Roxborough and Manayunk, and it is bounded by the Wissahickon Valley Park, Ridge Avenue, Hermit Street, and Henry Avenue. The name of the neighborhood is derived from the Lenni Lenape word wisameckham, for "catfish creek", a reference to the fish that were once plentiful in the Wissahickon Creek.

== History ==
The village of Wissahickon was founded by officials of the Pencoyd Iron Works in the late nineteenth century. Beginning in the 1880s, growing numbers of mill owners and wealthy business owners from neighboring Manayunk sought elegant homes on ample lots; they set their eyes on land previously owned by prominent Philadelphia families – including the Camac, Dobson, Salaignac, and Wetherill families – along the Wissahickon Creek. Grand single-detached and semi-detached homes with ample side and rear yards were built, creating "a unique park side Victorian wonderland." The neighborhood was considered a highly desirable place to live as it had proximity to the Wissahickon Valley, tree-lined streets, new sewers and water services, and grand homes in high Victorian styling.

== Historic structures ==
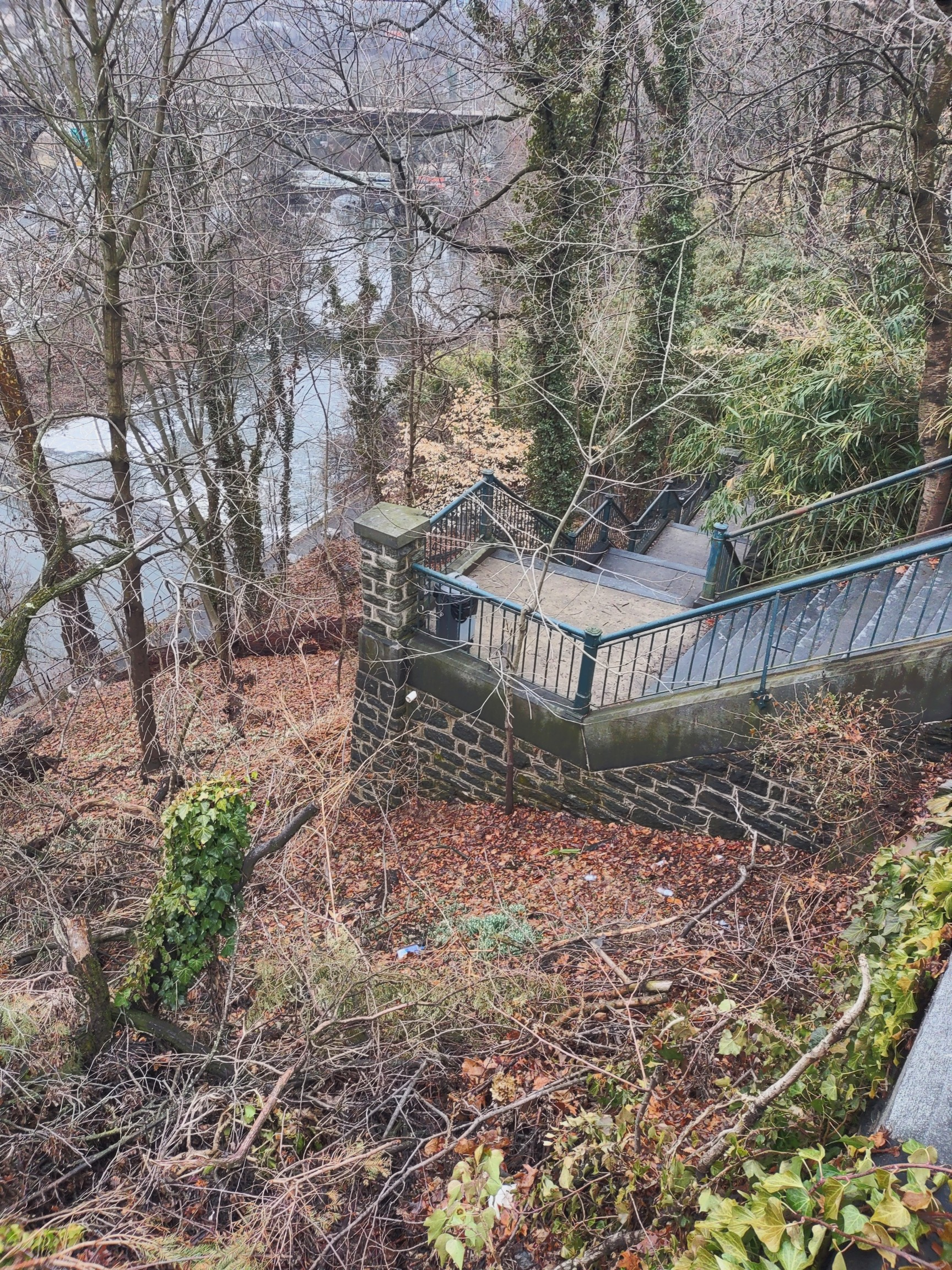
100 Steps in 2026

- The 100 Steps: Located at the base of Freeland Avenue, these broad stairs were built in 1901 of Wissahickon granite and local ironwork. Restoration work was completed between 2003 and 2005 as steps were repaired, new lighting was installed, and railings were replaced. The 100 Steps offer a convenient route to the trails in Wissahickon Valley Park. 40.017°N 75.2055°W
- Amos Barnes House: Located at 559 Righter Street, and built of Wissahickon schist circa 1856 in Gothic Revival style with Victorian Cottage elements, the house was owned by Amos Barnes, a Philadelphia architect who designed the Plays and Players Theater on Delancey Street as well as the 1927 addition to the Wissahickon Presbyterian Church. A plaque that was removed in 2017 from the front yard read as follows: Site of Hermit Lane & Ridge Ave. Here part of General Armstrong’s forces turned and marched to the Wissahickon, where they attacked the Hessians on the day of the Battle of Germantown, October 4, 1777. East of here is the Glen of Kelpius, the “Hermit of the Wissahickon,” and the old building at the point is the “Old Plow Tavern,” erected in 1746. While at top of hill on Righter Street a skirmish took place during the Revolution. This marker erected by Washington Camp No. 50 – Patriotic Order Sons of America and citizens of Twenty-First Ward. In 2017, the property was designated as historic by the Philadelphia Historical Commission and placed on the Philadelphia Register of Historic Places. In 2022, the Philadelphia Historical Commission approved an application to restore the house and construct a three-story multi-family building behind the historic building. 40.0237°N 75.2077°W
- Holt House: Located at 145 Sumac Street, and built circa 1884 in the Queen Anne style with Eastlake Victorian elements possibly by mason John Gilton, the house was owned by James Z. and Mary Holt, who were wealthy, prominent figures in Philadelphia society as well as early investors in the development of the Wissahickon neighborhood. James was a mill owner, plus an officer and trustee of the Manayunk Trust and the Manayunk Penny Savings bank. The building, one-half of a twin comprising 145 and 147 Sumac Street, was among the first grand homes built in Wissahickon during this Victorian era as a speculative housing development directed at the wealthier class looking to live in the then developing neighborhood, and exemplifies the economic, social, and historical heritage of the community. In 2015, the house garnered local attention when it was slated for demolition to build multiple housing units. The local civic association, the owner, developer and the city later reached an agreement to save the house from demolition and instead renovate it with "historic sensitivity." In late 2019, staff from the Philadelphia Historical Commission's Committee on Historic Designation revised and resubmitted a nomination for historic designation consideration. 40.0176°N 75.2085°W
- James Sibbald House: Located at 5201 Ridge Avenue and built circa 1890, the house was owned by Dr. James Sibbald, a local surgeon during the late nineteenth and early twentieth centuries. The house was designed by architect Daniel S. Beale in the Late Victoria style. Sibbald also owned and sold several other three-story buildings on the east side of Ridge Avenue above Terrace Street. 40.0185°N 75.2111°W
- Maurice Wilhere House: Located at 147 Sumac Street, and built circa 1884 in the Queen Anne style with Eastlake Victorian elements possibly by mason John Gilton, the house was owned by Maurice F. Wilhere, who was a magistrate and prominent figure in the local Democratic Committee in Philadelphia. The building, one-half of a twin comprising 145 and 147 Sumac Street, was among the first grand homes built in Wissahickon during this Victorian era as a speculative housing development directed at the wealthier class looking to live in the then developing neighborhood, and exemplifies the economic, social, and historical heritage of the community. In late 2019, staff from the Philadelphia Historical Commission’s Committee on Historic Designation revised and resubmitted a nomination for historic designation consideration. 40.01785°N 75.2084°W
- Merrick Hall: Located on the 5300 block of Ridge Avenue, this is the oldest building on Northern Children’s Services campus. Designed in the Italianate style by noted Philadelphia architect Lindley Johnson in the 1860s, it was originally the former home of 19th century industrialist J. Vaughan Merrick. The mansion included all of the character-defining features of the Italianate: a tower, bracketed eaves, large porches supported by square pillars, and four-over-four double-hung windows. The house was renovated in 1927 by the well-known Philadelphia architect Horace Trumbauer and more recently in 2012–14 by Philadelphia architecture firm Jacobs Wyper Architects.
- Northern Children's Services: Located on the 5300 block of Ridge Avenue, this is a cluster of stone buildings, including four dormitories, an infirmary, a dining hall and kitchen, a gymnasium, a library and meeting rooms, designed and altered by Philadelphia architect Horace Trumbauer in 1927 on a six-acre campus aimed at helping children and their families do better.
- The Ridge Avenue Bridge: Located at the southern edge of the neighborhood, it is a triple-span stone arch bridge built in 1888 and added to the National Register of Historic Places in 1988. The bridge carries Ridge Avenue over the Wissahickon Creek and into East Falls.
- St. Timothy's Workingmen's Club and Institute: Located at the intersection of Ridge Avenue, Terrace Street, and Vassar Street, and founded in 1872 with funds donated by the Merrick family and St. Timothy's Episcopal Church. Constructed of Wissahickon schist with granite trim, the building was designed in High Victorian Gothic style by architect Charles M. Burns Jr. and completed in 1877. Mr. J. Vaughan Merrick delivered an address at the opening of the new building. The club provided social and educational opportunities for working men: there was a library plus reading and billiard rooms, baseball and cricket teams, in addition to free night classes in mechanical drawing, engineering, and chemistry. The club ceased operations in 1912 due to declining membership brought on by the increase of local public libraries and public schools as well as the invention of the motion picture as entertainment. The building was added to the Philadelphia Register of Historic Places in 1974.
- William Paine House: Located at the intersection of Vicaris Street and Osborn Street, the house was built circa 1869 in the Georgian style and added to the Philadelphia Register of Historic Places in 1993. William Paine, M.D., (1821–1893), practitioner of eclectic medicine, was a faculty member, general manager, and dean of the American College of Medicine in Philadelphia (also known as the Philadelphia University of Medicine and Surgery) until he was caught up in controversies surrounding trade in bogus diplomas.
- Wissahickon Presbyterian Church: Located at the intersection of Ridge Avenue, Dawson Street, and Manayunk Avenue, the church was built in 1893 and started with 54 members. The building is Gothic and Renaissance style combined, built with Avondale stone with limestone trimmings.

== Gallery ==
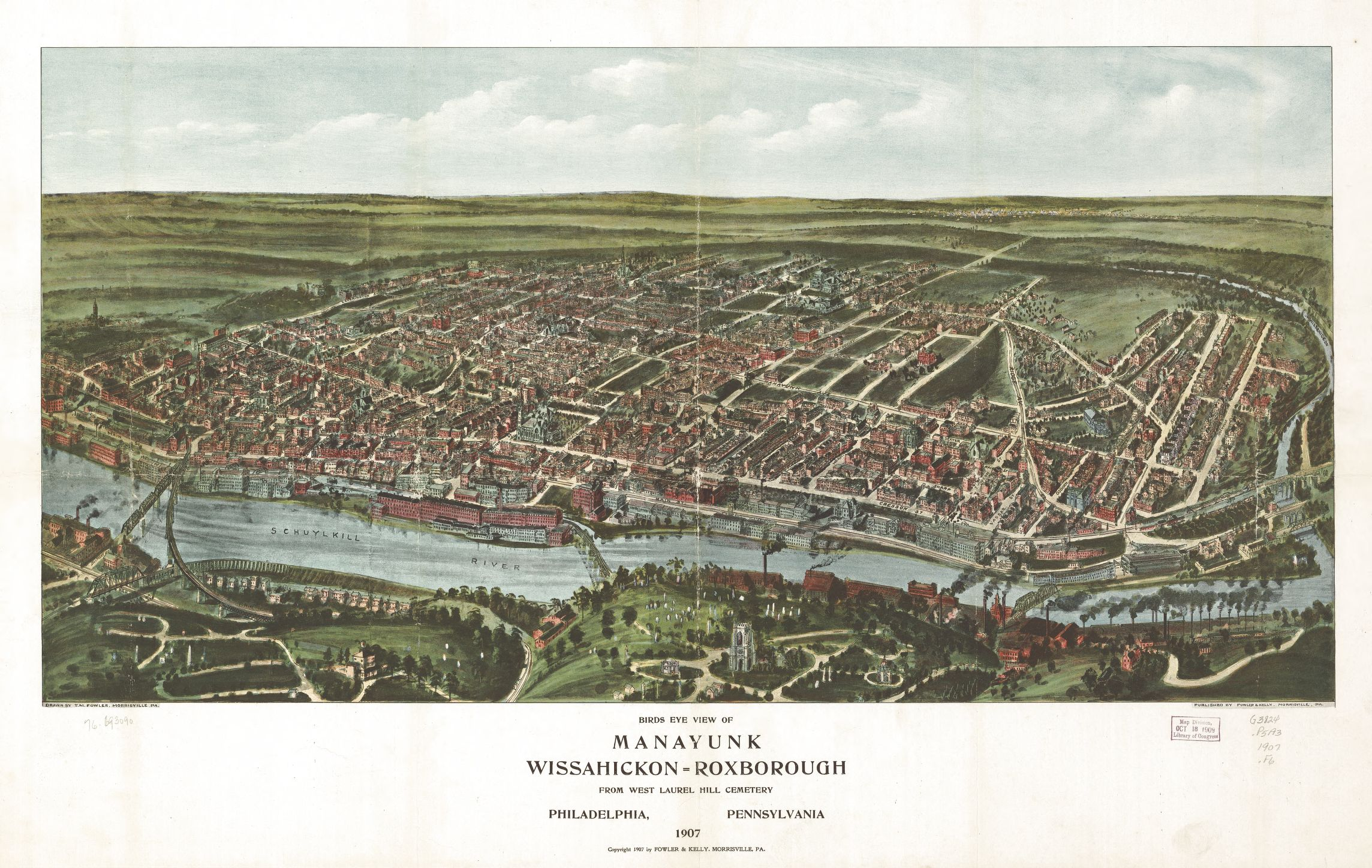
Birds Eye View of Manayunk, Wissahickon, Roxborough from West Laurel Hill Cemetery, 1907

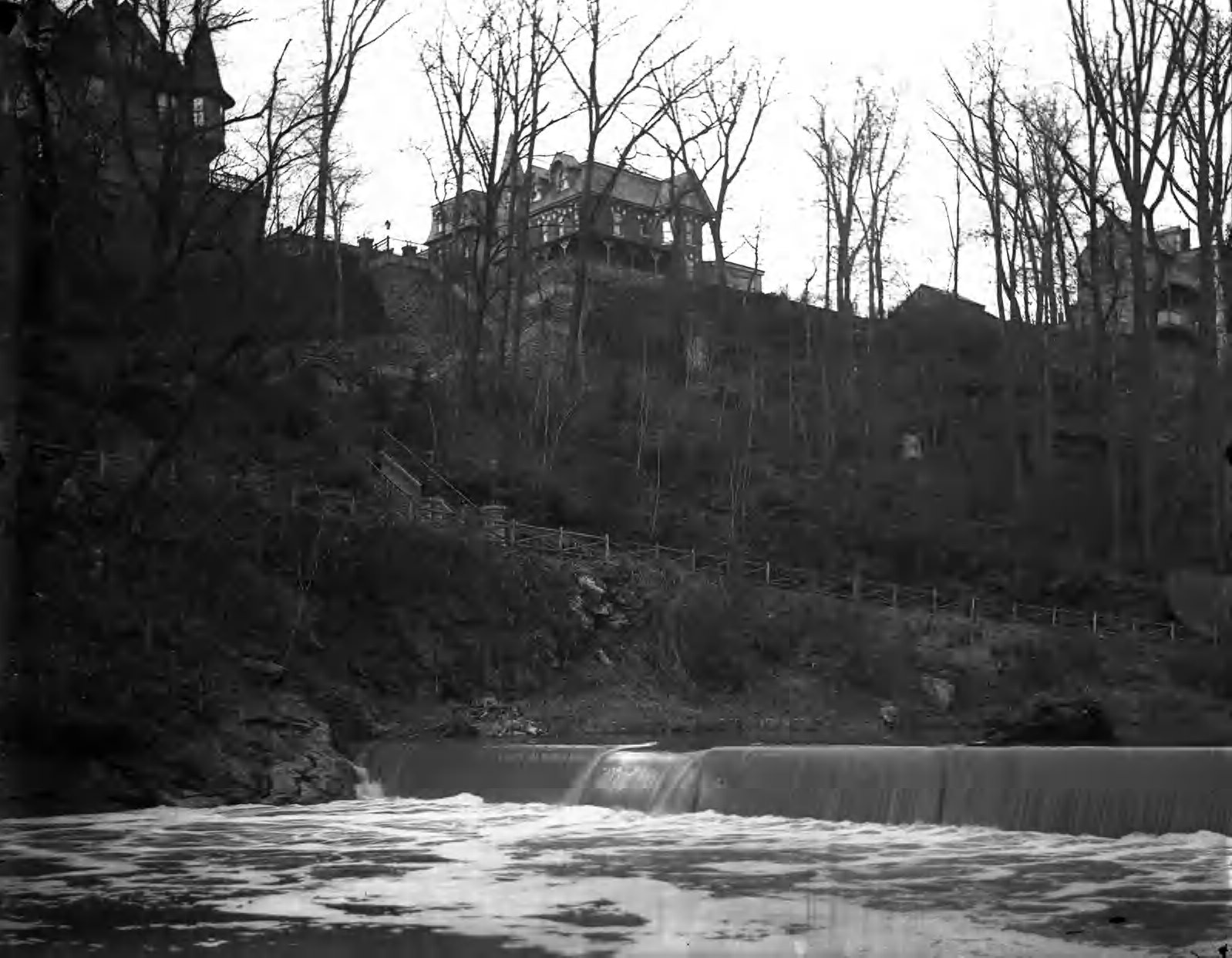
View of the 100 steps from the Wissahickon Creek, 1907

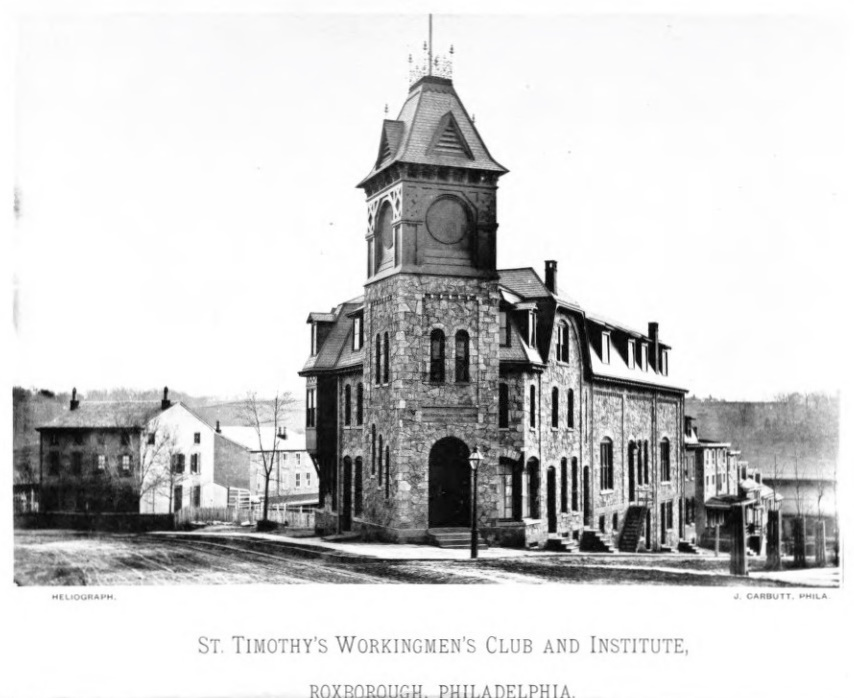
St. Timothy's Workingmen's Club and Institute, 1878

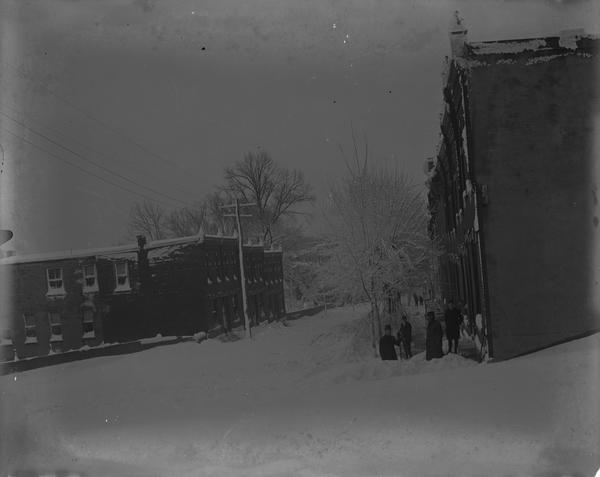
Snow scene, 100 block of Kalos Street, 1907

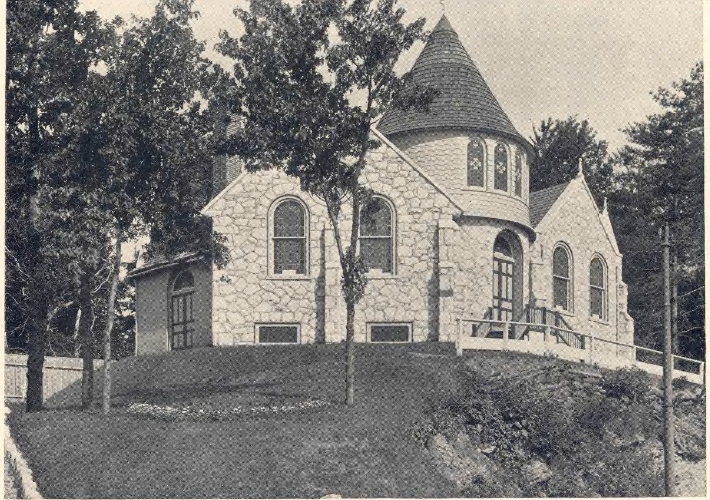
Wissahickon Presbyterian Church, 1895

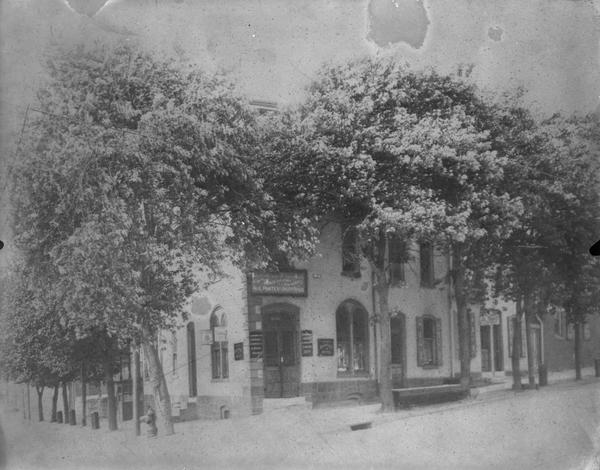
Sarah A. Wright's ale, porter & lager beer saloon, 5226 Ridge Avenue, 1907

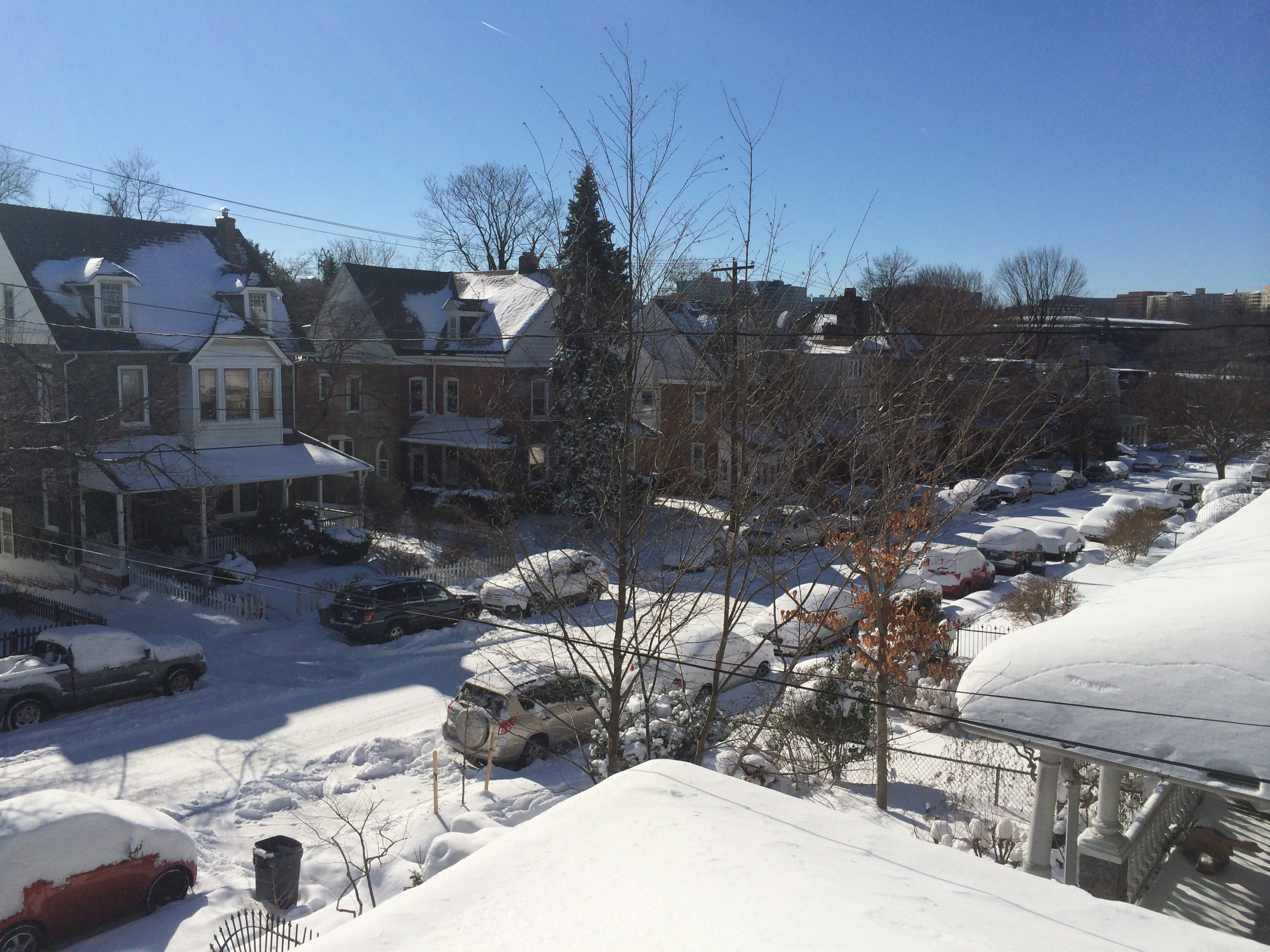
Rochelle Avenue on a snowy day, 2014

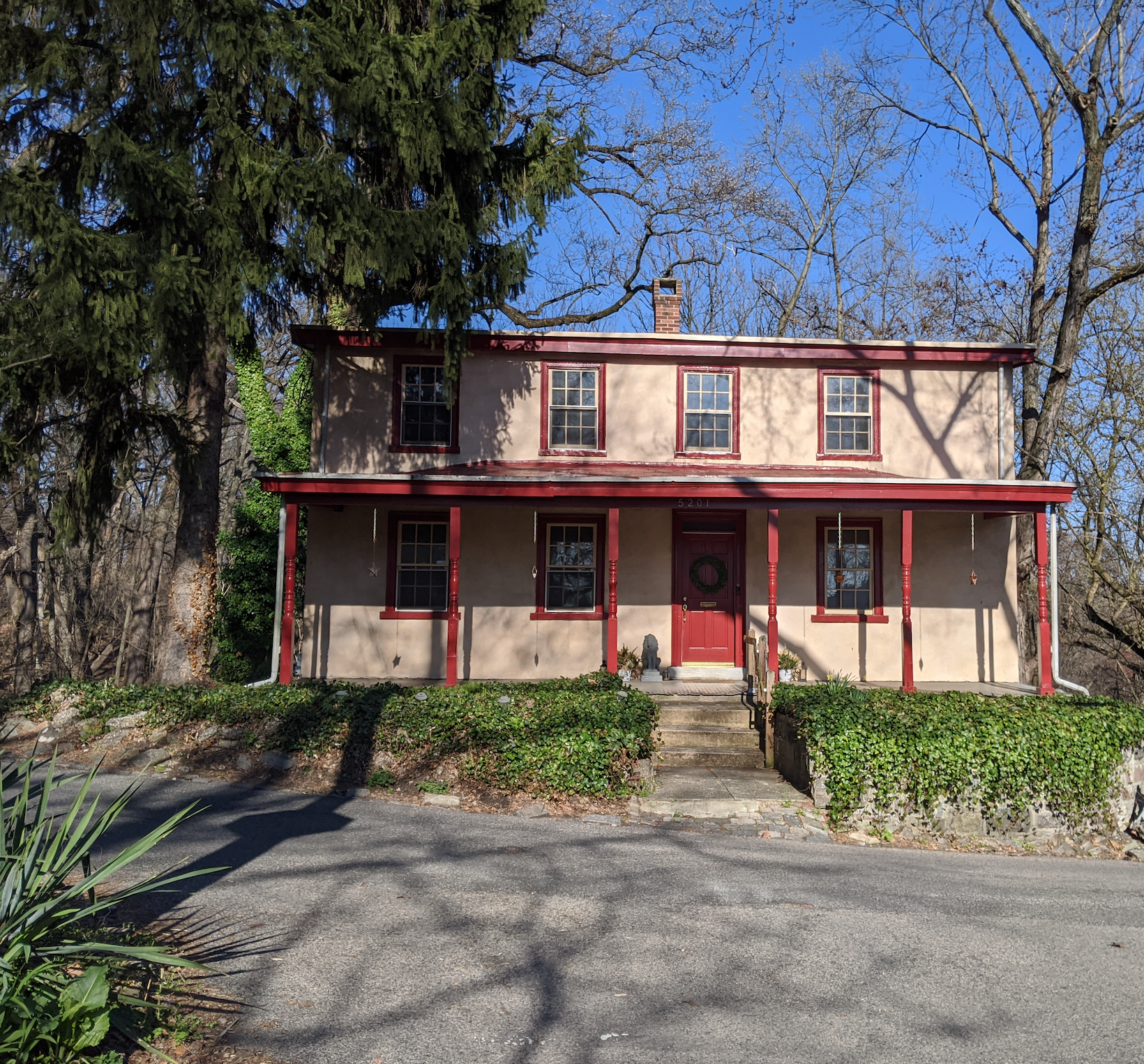
William Paine House, 2020

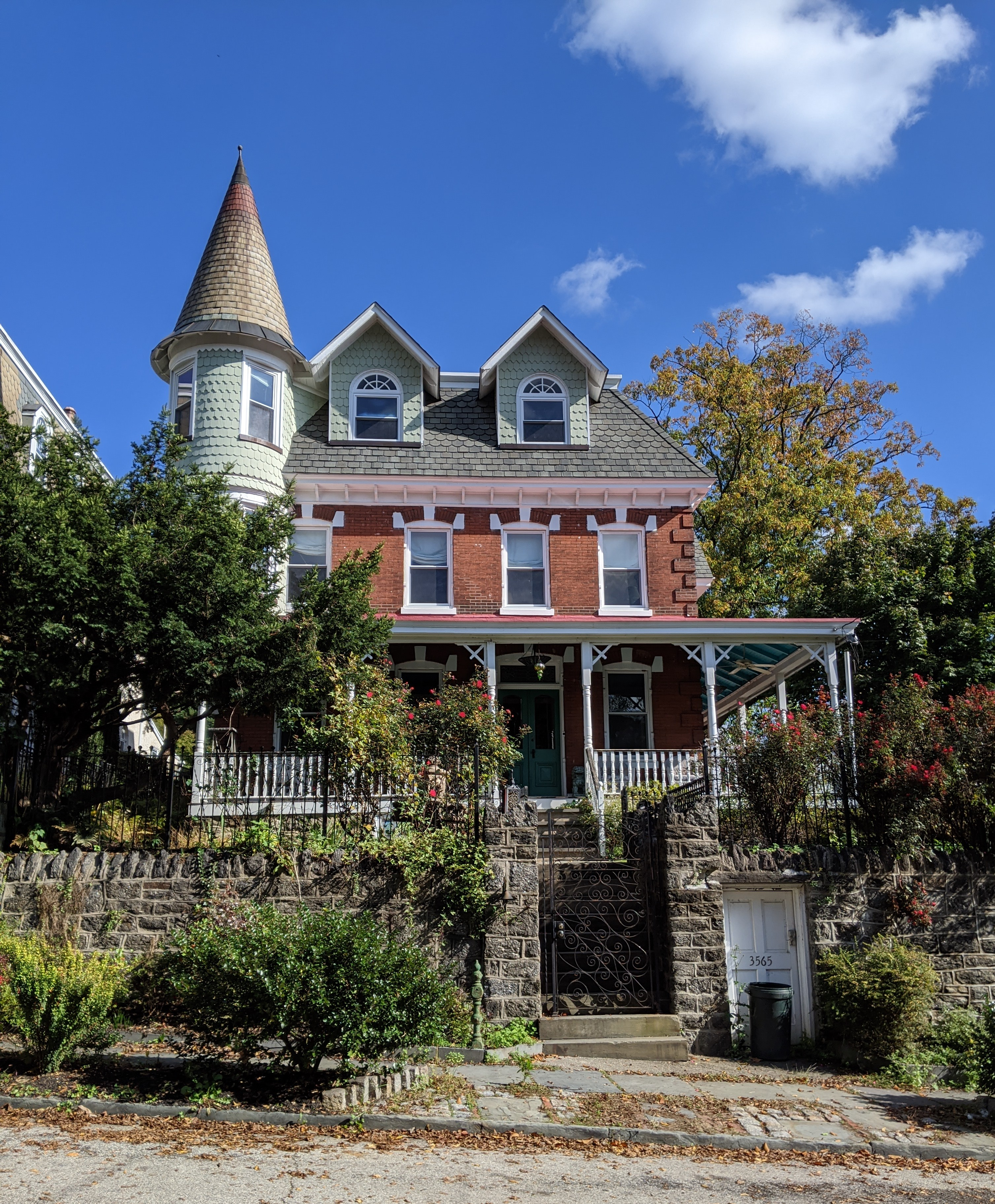
Albanus Harmer House, 2020

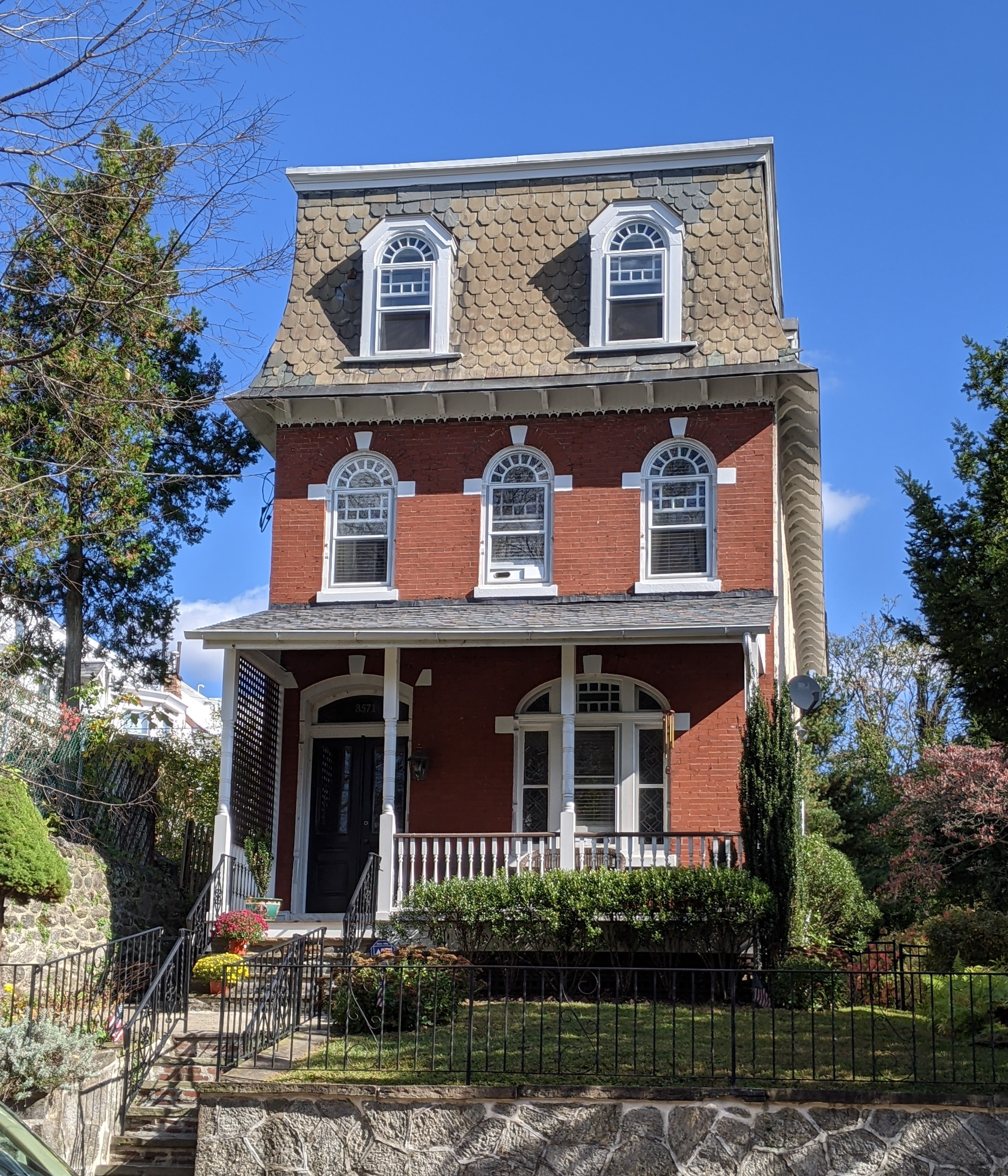
Eugene Kaiser House, 2020

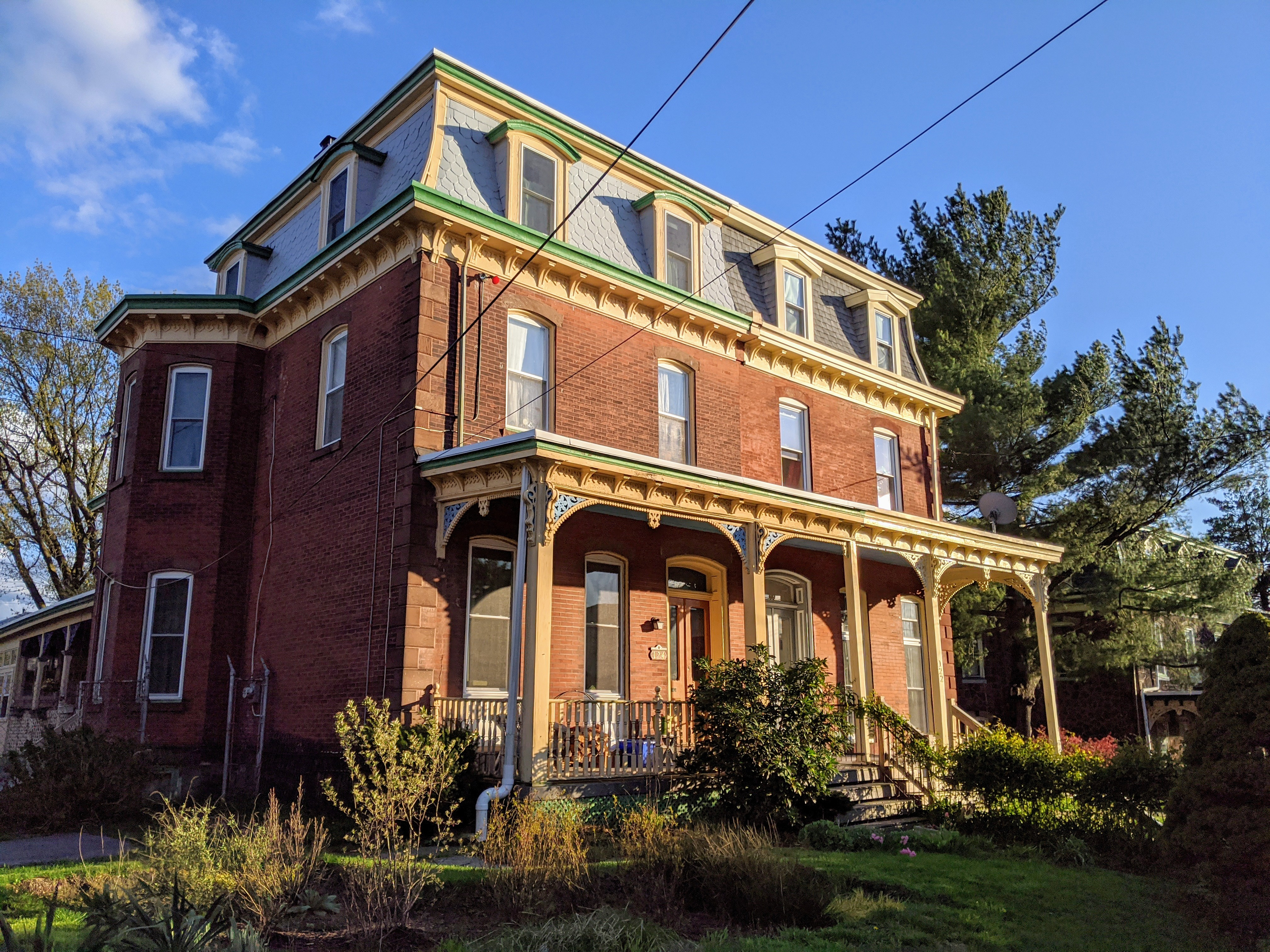
H. Rother and A.F. Hoffman Twin, 2020

== Government ==
- Philadelphia City Council District 4
- 21st Ward
- U.S. Representative District 3
- State Senator Districts 7 and 3
- State Representative District 194

== Demographics ==
Taking into consideration the four Census Block Groups that mostly comprise the area (BG0209001, BG0209002, BG0209003, and BG0211001), as of the 2010 Census, the Wissahickon neighborhood had roughly 3,163 residents, 1,520 households, and 659 families. The racial makeup of Wissahickon was roughly 87.48% White/Caucasian, 6.32% Black or African-American, 2.84% Asian, 2.75% two or more races, .41% some other race, and .18% were American Indian/Alaska Native. Native or Latino people of any race were roughly 2.87% of the population.

Of the roughly 1,520 households, 15% had children under the age of 18 living with them.

Roughly 44.10% of the residents were between 18 and 34 years old, 33.10% between 35 and 64 years old, 12.64% are under 18 years old, and 10.14% are over 65 years old.

== Education ==
=== Primary and secondary education ===
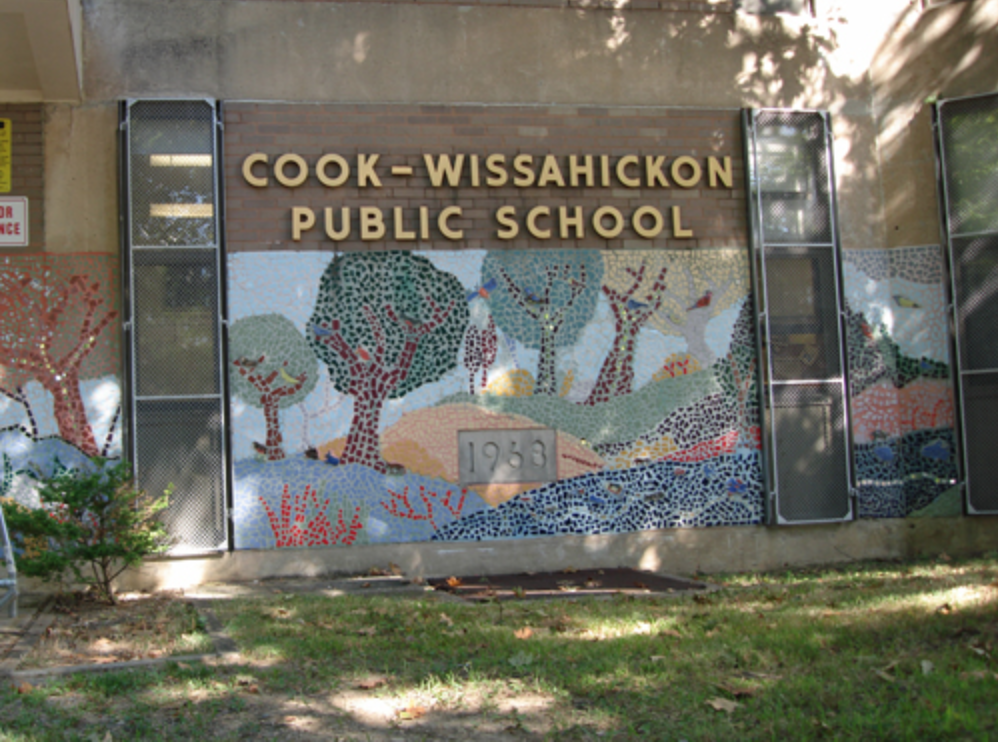
Cook-Wissahickon Public School, 2014

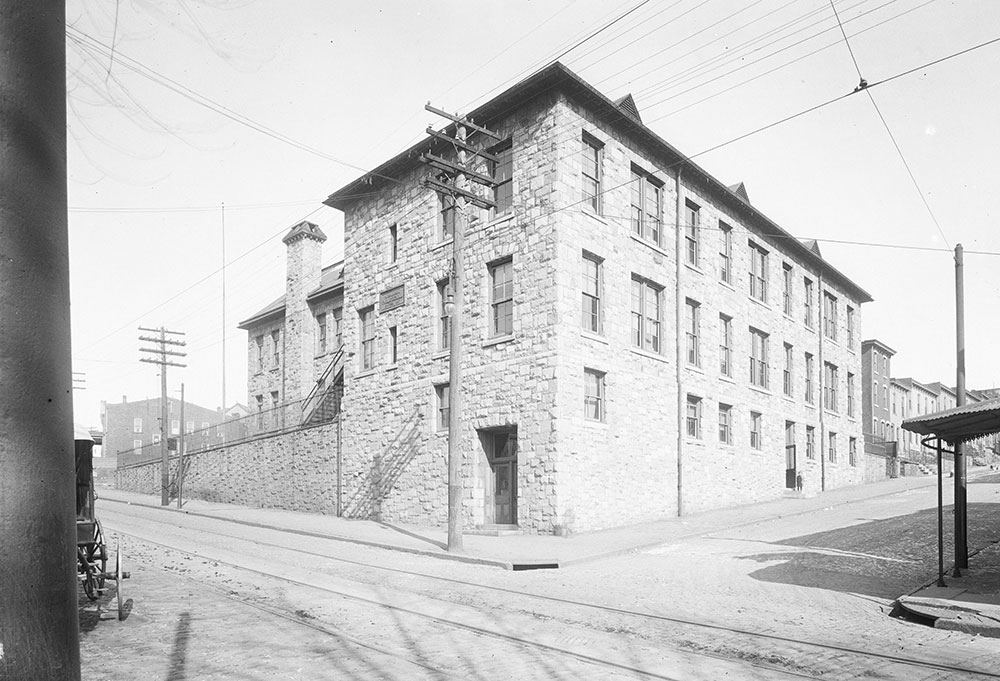
Wissahickon School, 1914

The School District of Philadelphia operates public schools. Cook-Wissahickon School is a K-8 grade school located in the area. The school was built in 1968 at the corner of East Salaignac and Righter Streets to replace the aging Cook Public School and the Wissahickon School. The former Wissahickon School, built in 1887, was located at the north east corner of (then) Ridge Avenue and Kalos Street, now the site of LaNoche Park.

Residents zoned to Cook-Wissahickon are zoned to Roxborough High School.

=== Public libraries ===
Free Library of Philadelphia operates its Roxborough Branch, serving Wissahickon, at 6245 Ridge Avenue at Hermitage Street.

A prior library, the Wissahickon Branch, located at Manayunk Avenue and Osborn Street, opened in 1909 and was built on land donated by the Pencoyd Iron Works. It was the ninth Andrew Carnegie-funded Free Library branch designed by the architectural firm of Whitfield and King and featured a main reading room, a children's room which also served as a lecture room seating 100, and a basement consisting of a boiler room, coal bin, staff room, a small magazine room, and two toilets. The Wissahickon Branch served the Wissahickon neighborhood until it closed in 1969. Sometime soon after, the building burned down.

== Parks and recreation ==
- David P. Montgomery Field: Formerly known as Daisy Field. Named after David Montgomery, former president of Philadelphia Phillies.
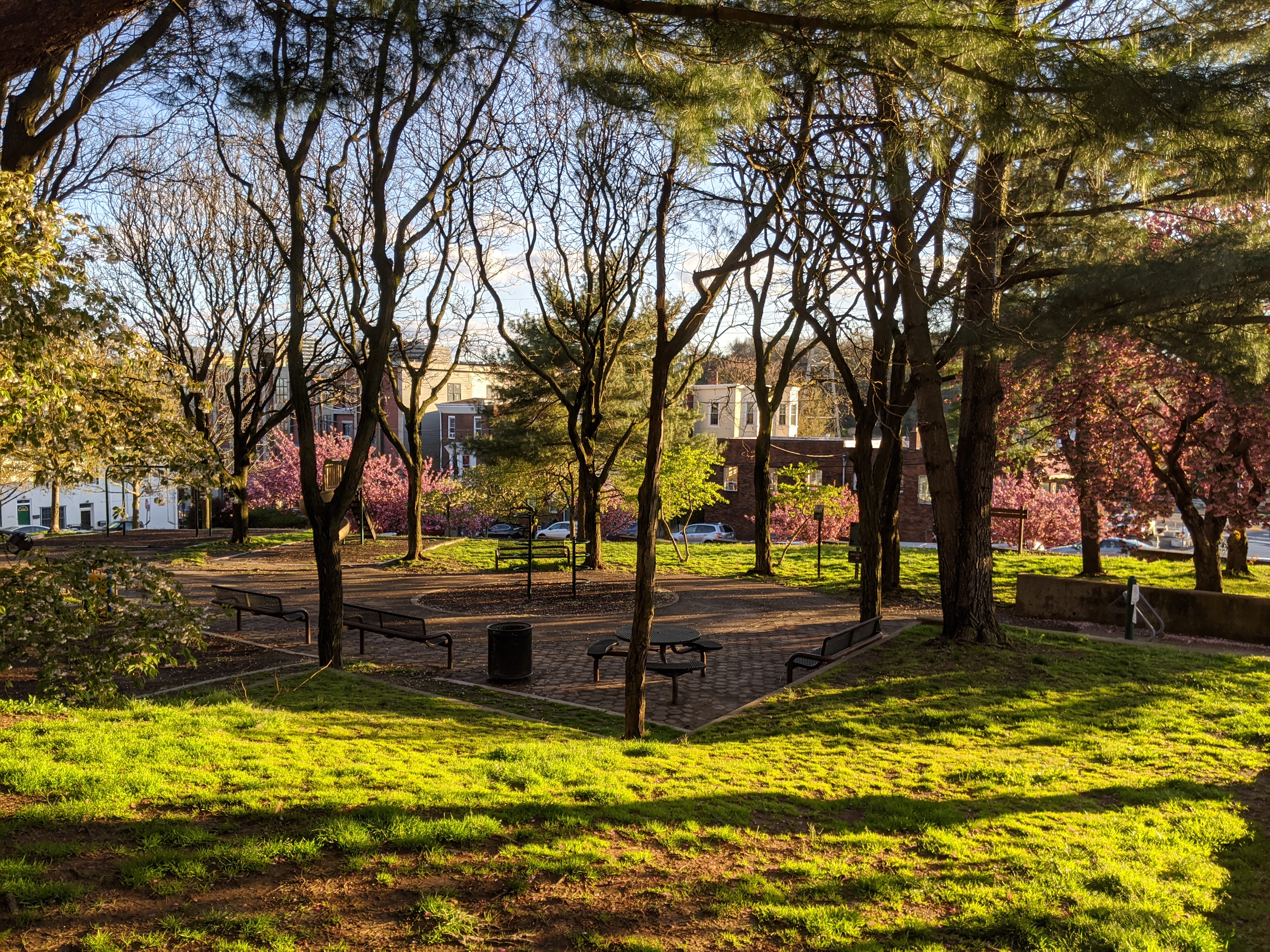
- LaNoche Park, 2020
  LaNoce Park: Bounded by Osborn Street, Rochelle Avenue, and Kalos Street, this park is the site of the former Wissahickon School and was established in 1984 by way of transfer to the Fairmount Park Commission. It was named for former owner of the Wissahickon Barber Shop and community leader Sabatina LaNoce who died in 1980.
- Wissahickon Valley Park: An 1,800 acre watershed park surrounding the Wissahickon Creek with some 50 miles of wooded biking, hiking, and equestrian trails. Established in 1867, the park is owned by the City of Philadelphia and maintained by the Philadelphia Parks & Recreation (PPR). The Friends of the Wissahickon partners with the PPR to preserve and enhance the park.

== Transportation ==
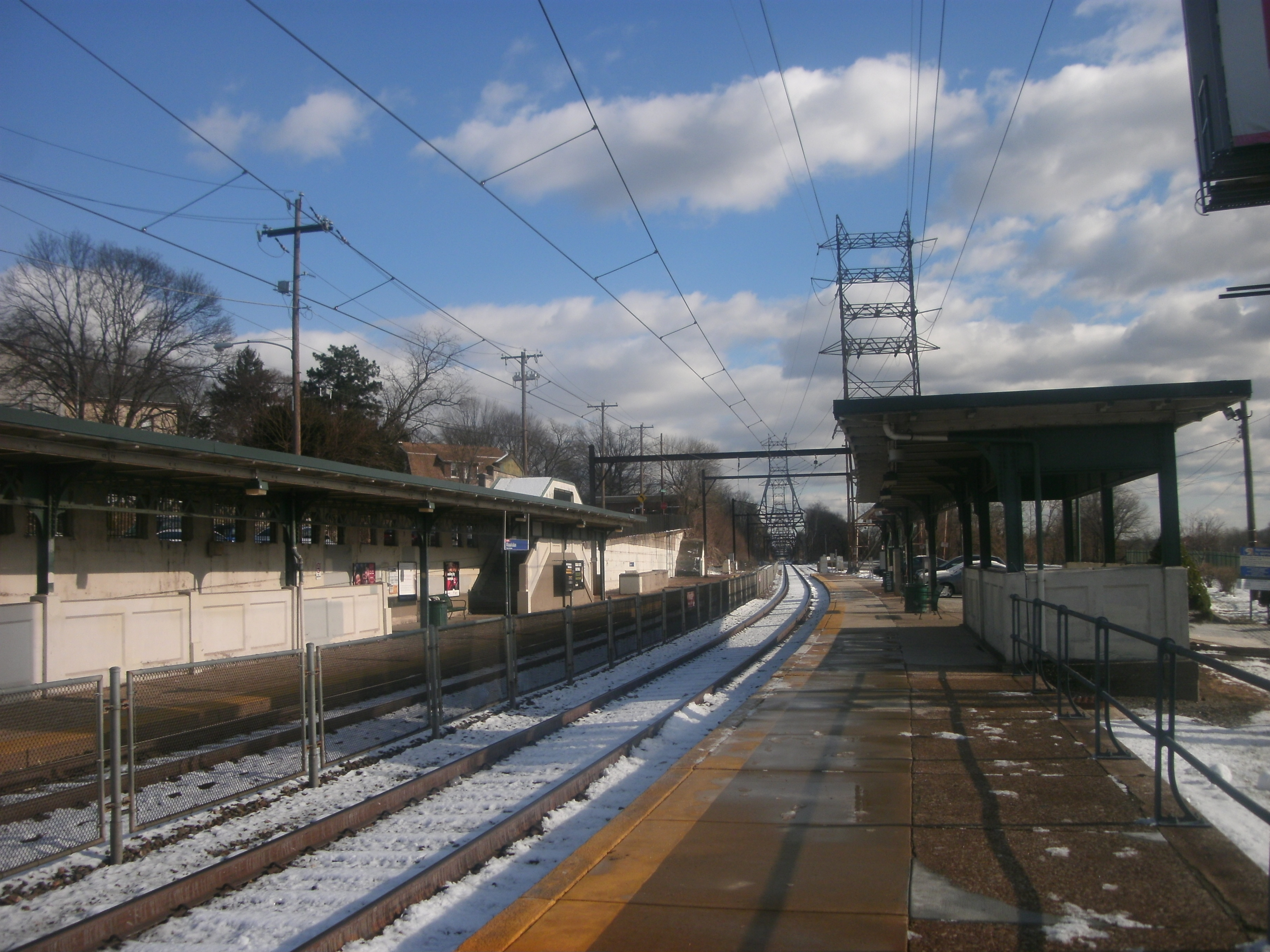
Wissahickon Station on the SEPTA Regional Rail Manayunk/Norristown Line, 2012

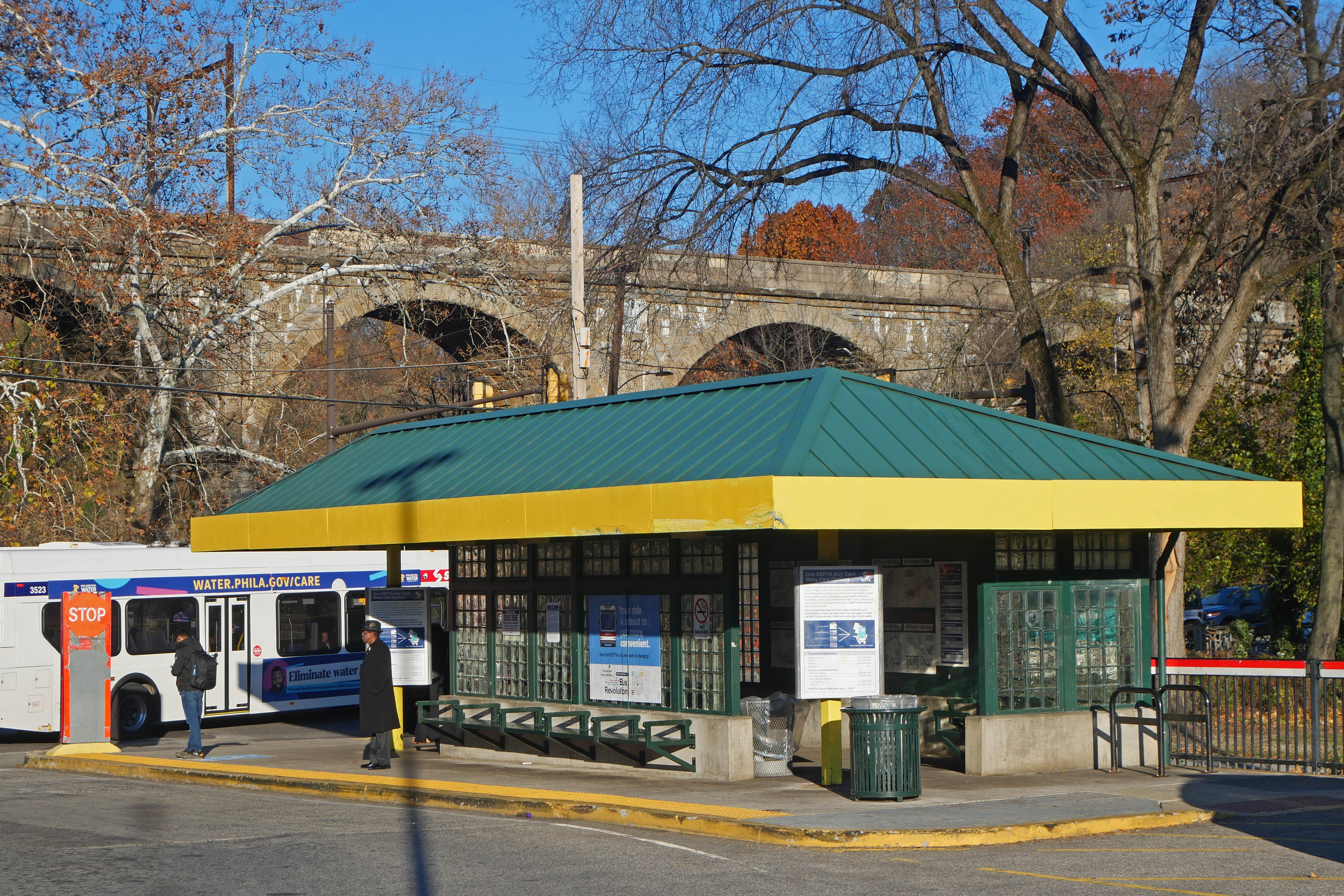
Wissahickon Transportation Center

Along the perimeter of Wissahickon is one of the longest and oldest thoroughfares in Philadelphia, Ridge Avenue.

One SEPTA Regional Rail line connects the neighborhood to Center City: the Manayunk/Norristown Line stops at the Wissahickon station. The station was once home to a building designed by the renowned architect Frank Furness; however, the building was later demolished. Improvements were made to the existing station, and during Summer 2016, local artist and Moore College of Art & Design faculty member, David Guinn painted a mural on a retaining wall running along the outbound platform of the station, coordinated by the Wissahickon Interested Citizen's Association, Mural Arts Program, and Cook-Wissahickon School.

The neighborhood is also served by bus routes 9, 27, and 65. The Wissahickon Transportation Center offers connecting service to routes 1, 9, 27, 35, 38, 52, 61, 62, 65, 82, 124, & 125. Plans for renovating the Wissahickon Transportation Center were released in 2018 by the Philadelphia City Planning Commission. Called the Wissahickon Gateway Plan, the plan's proposals to expand the transfer station, improve Ridge Avenue, extend the Schuylkill River Trail, and introduce new development (including shops, offices, and apartments) were met with mixed reviews. However, in 2025, a new terminal opened next to the old loop. This new terminal has berths, & countdown clocks. The new terminal was built so that when more routes join Routes 1, 9, 27, 35, 38, 52, 61, 62, 65, 82, 124, & 125, they can get a berth to occupy each part of the terminal. Route 52 was extended to Wissahickon in 2026 in preparation of the New Bus Network.

== Civic association ==
The local civic association is called Wissahickon Interested Citizen's Association (WICA). The association was instrumental in preparing and implementing a Neighborhood Conversation Overlay (NCO) to mitigate the impact of new development in the neighborhood as well as maintain the walkability and character of it. Public meetings are held on the second Wednesday of every month. Another area civic association, Wissahickon Neighbors Civic Association (WNCA), serves the community northwest of Ridge Avenue. Public meetings are held on the third Thursday of every month at Pilgrim Church.

== Historic maps of the area ==
- Index and Legend from Philadelphia Land Use Map, 1962
- Index and Legend from Philadelphia Land Use Map, 1942
- Atlas of the 21st Ward, Philadelphia, Penna., 1929 (upd. 1945)
- Part of Ward 21 (Plate 32) from Atlas of the City of Philadelphia, 1910
- Part of Ward 21 (Plate 32) from Atlas of the City of Philadelphia, Complete in One Volume, 1901
- Part of Ward 21 (Plate 32) from Atlas of the City of Philadelphia, 1895
- Plan 39 from Baist's Property Atlas of the City and County of Philadelphia, Penna., 1895
- City Atlas of Philadelphia, Vol. 2, Wards 21 and 28, 1875
- Section 20 from Atlas of the City of Philadelphia, 1862
