= W.B. Saul High School =

Public magnet high school in Philadelphia, Pennsylvania

Coordinates: 40.04942°N 75.22158°W

- Philadelphia, Pennsylvania; United States of America

Information
- Former names: Walter Biddle Saul High School of Agricultural Sciences; Wissahickon Farm School
- Established: 1943
- School board: Philadelphia Board of Education
- School district: School District of Philadelphia
- Grades: 9-12
- Enrollment: 546(as of fall 2015)
- Website: saul.philasd.org

W.B. Saul High School, previously the Walter Biddle Saul High School of Agricultural Sciences, is a magnet high school in Roxborough, Philadelphia. The school, a part of the School District of Philadelphia, serves grades 9 through 12. Saul is a magnet school in the agricultural fields.

Saul is the largest agricultural farm school in the United States. The school has the largest FFA (formerly Future Farmers of America) chapter in the State of Pennsylvania and one of the largest in the United States. Saul has two farmers as staff members.

== History ==
The school opened in 1943 as the Wissahickon Farm School. Saul concentrated in traditional agricultural subjects for many years. Kristen A. Graham of The Philadelphia Inquirer said in 2012 that "a recent focus has been on boosting academics, on inquiry-based learning that opens the door to a wider range of careers."

== Campus ==
The 130-acre (53 ha) campus is on the Wissahickon Valley in upper Roxborough, Philadelphia, adjacent to Fairmount Park. The campus is located on both sides of Henry Avenue. One side houses the academic, agricultural, and physical education/health buildings as well as the greenhouses and small animal laboratory buildings. On that side those buildings are adjacent to the basketball court, open soccer field and school gym. The portion on the other side of Henry Avenue houses the school's field crop area, nursery, pasture area for livestock, and working farm. The working farm houses dairy, horses, sheep, and swine, as well as the school's meat science program.

== Admissions ==
Kristen A. Graham of The Philadelphia Inquirer said in 2012 that Saul "requires strong grades for admission". The school received 1,100 applications for the first year (freshman) class of the 2012-2013 school year, according to Tamera Conaway, the principal. In order to get in one must score a 75% or above on the PSSAs, have all A's and B's and no more than 15 absences.

== Academics ==
As of 2015 64% of Saul graduates attend colleges and universities.

== Demographics ==
As of fall 2015 the school had 546 students, including 182 first year students (freshmen). Kristen A. Graham of The Philadelphia Inquirer said that the size of the first year class for that school year was larger than the usual size of a freshman class at Saul. During that year, 65.8% of students were African-American, 17.4% were White, and 13.9% were Hispanic. 40.1% were classified as economically disadvantaged. 9.5% require special education services. Graham characterized the Saul student body as "diverse".
