= Wissahickon station =

Railway station in Philadelphia

Wissahickon
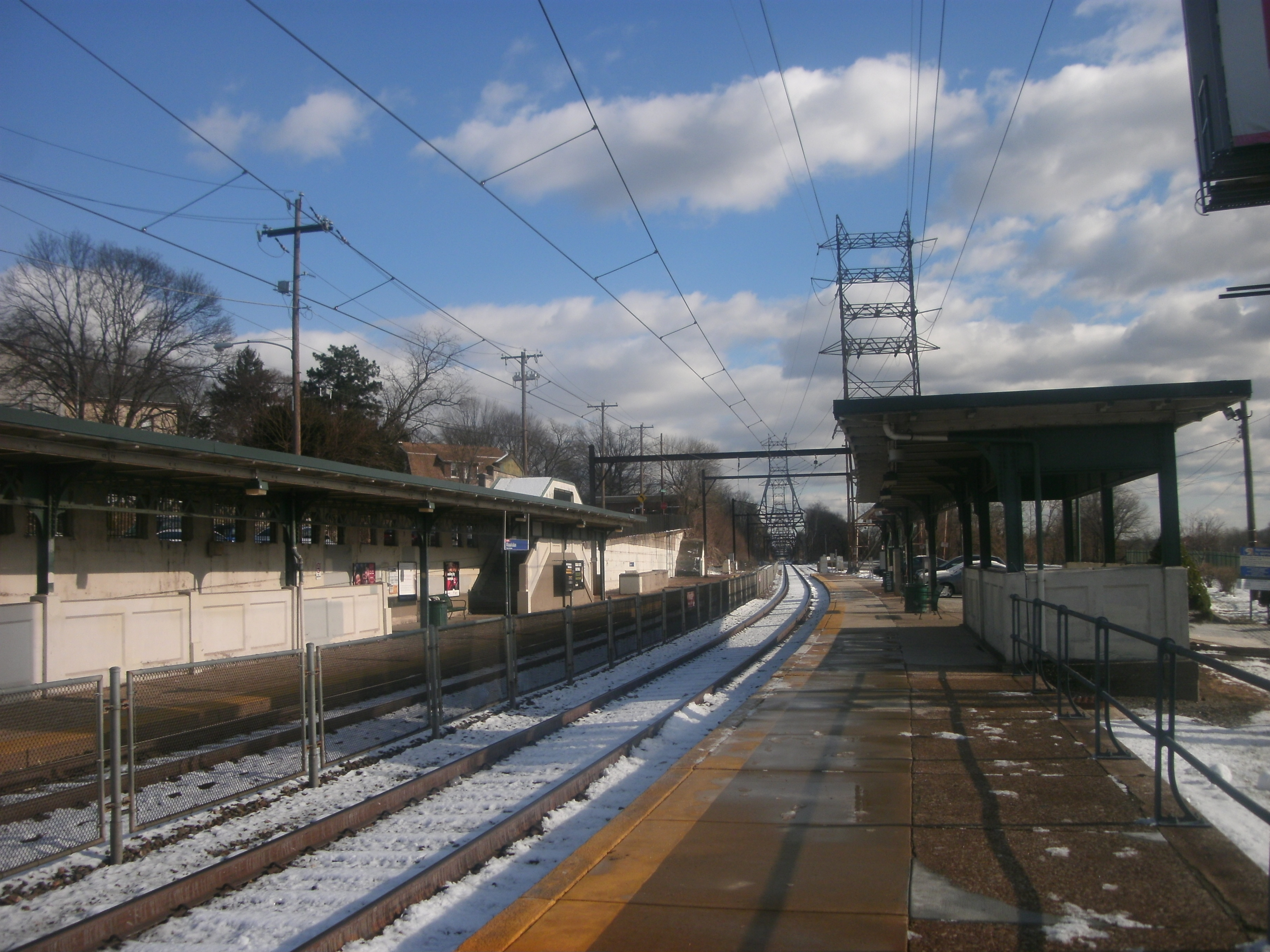
- Wissahickon station in December 2012.

General information
- Location: 5001 Ridge Avenue (near Rochelle Avenue); Wissahickon, Philadelphia, Pennsylvania
- Coordinates: 40.0165°N 75.2103°W
- Owner: SEPTA
- Line: Norristown Branch
- Platforms: 2 side platforms
- Tracks: 2
- Connections: SEPTA City Bus: 1, 9, 27, 38, 52, 60, 61, 65, 82; SEPTA Suburban Bus: 124, 125

Construction
- Parking: 95 spaces
- Accessible: No

Other information
- Fare zone: 1

History
- Electrified: February 5, 1933

Passengers
- 2017: 520 boardings 557 alightings (weekday average)
- Rank: 47 of 146

Services
Preceding station	SEPTA	Following station
Manayunk toward Norristown–Elm Street	Manayunk/Norristown Line	East Falls toward Penn Medicine Station
Former services
Preceding station	Reading Railroad	Following station
Manayunk toward Pottsville	Main Line	East Falls toward Philadelphia
Manayunk toward Elm Street	Norristown Branch	East Falls toward Philadelphia
Location

Wissahickon is an active commuter railroad train station in the namesake Wissahickon section of Philadelphia, Pennsylvania. Located on Ridge Avenue (inbound) and Rochelle Avenue (outbound), Wissahickon station serves trains of SEPTA Regional Rail's Manayunk/Norristown Line between Temple University station and Elm Street station in Norristown. Wissahickon station consists of two low-level side platforms surrounding two tracks. The station is across Ridge Avenue from the Wissahickon Transportation Center, a bus station serving as a transfer hub for 12 bus routes operated by SEPTA. The bus station was renovated and expanded in 2026.

The current Wissahickon railroad station opened on September 12, 1930 with the realignment of rail service by the Reading Railroad through Wissahickon and Manayunk.

== Gallery ==
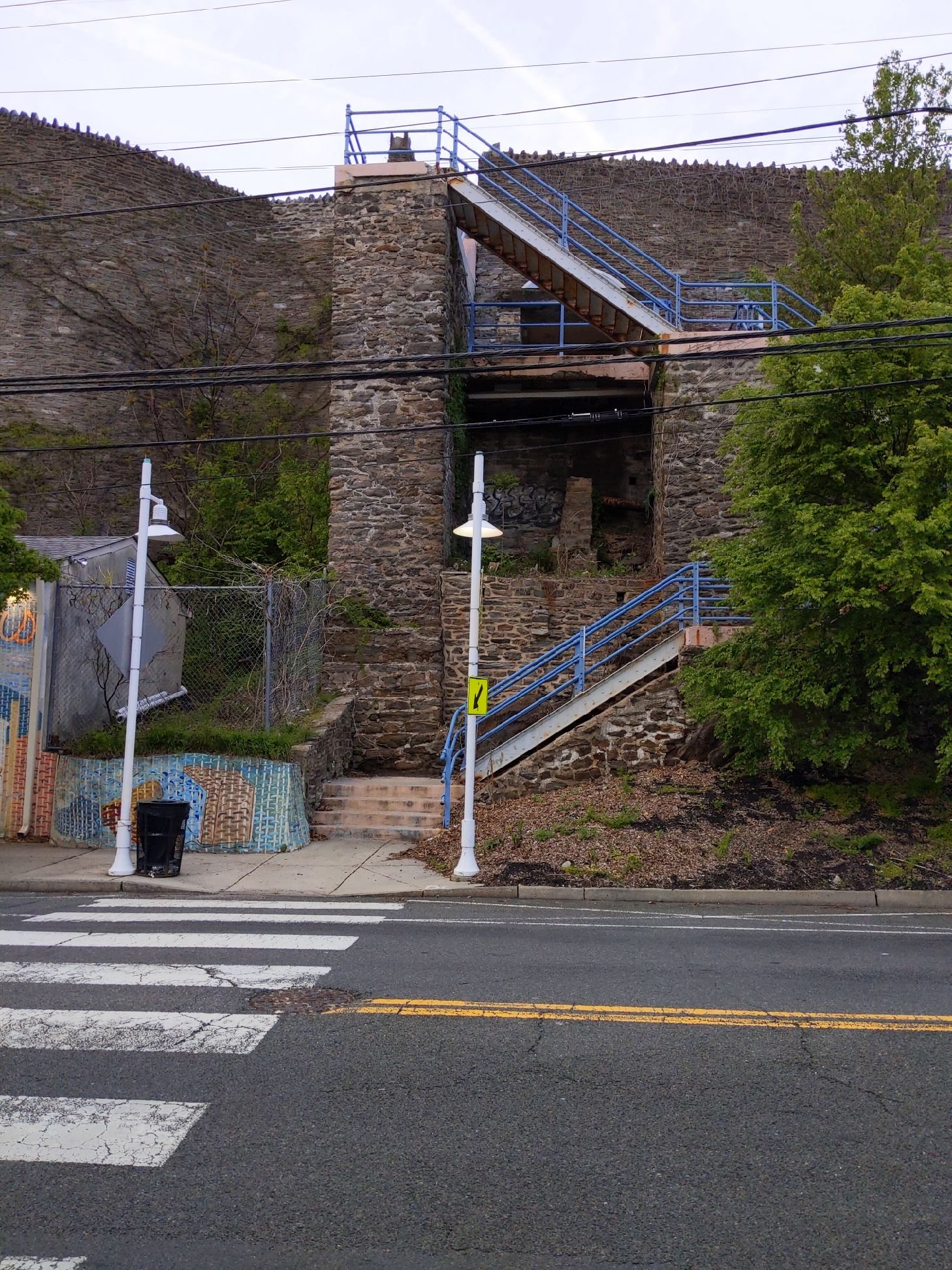
Entrance to Wissahickon station platform (stairwell leading up to tunnel)

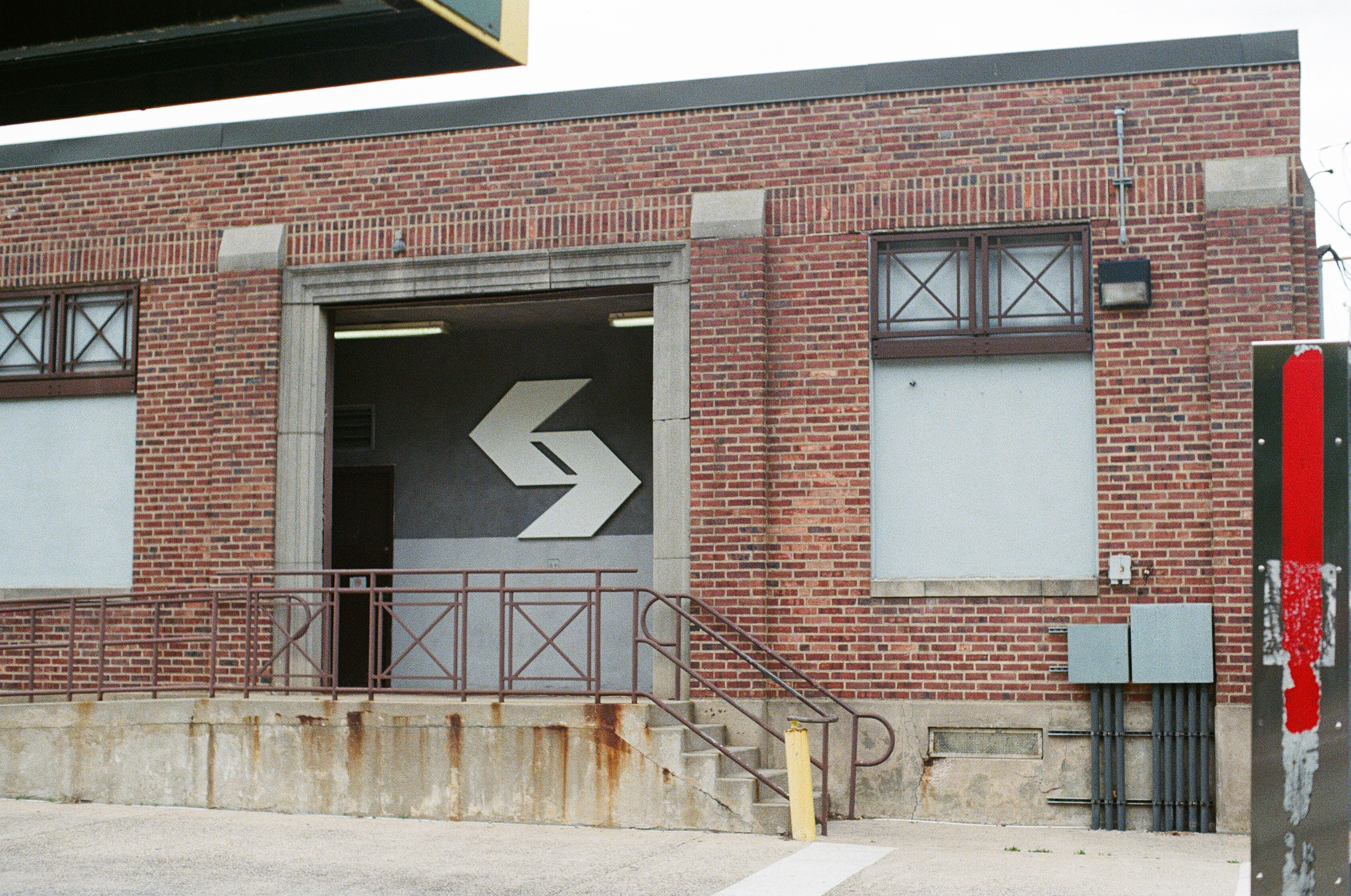
Building next to Wissahickon transit center bus loop
