= McGillin =

McGillin may refer to:

- Howard McGillin (born 1953), American actor
- McGillin's Olde Ale House, tavern in Philadelphia, Pennsylvania
