= List of tourist attractions in Philadelphia =

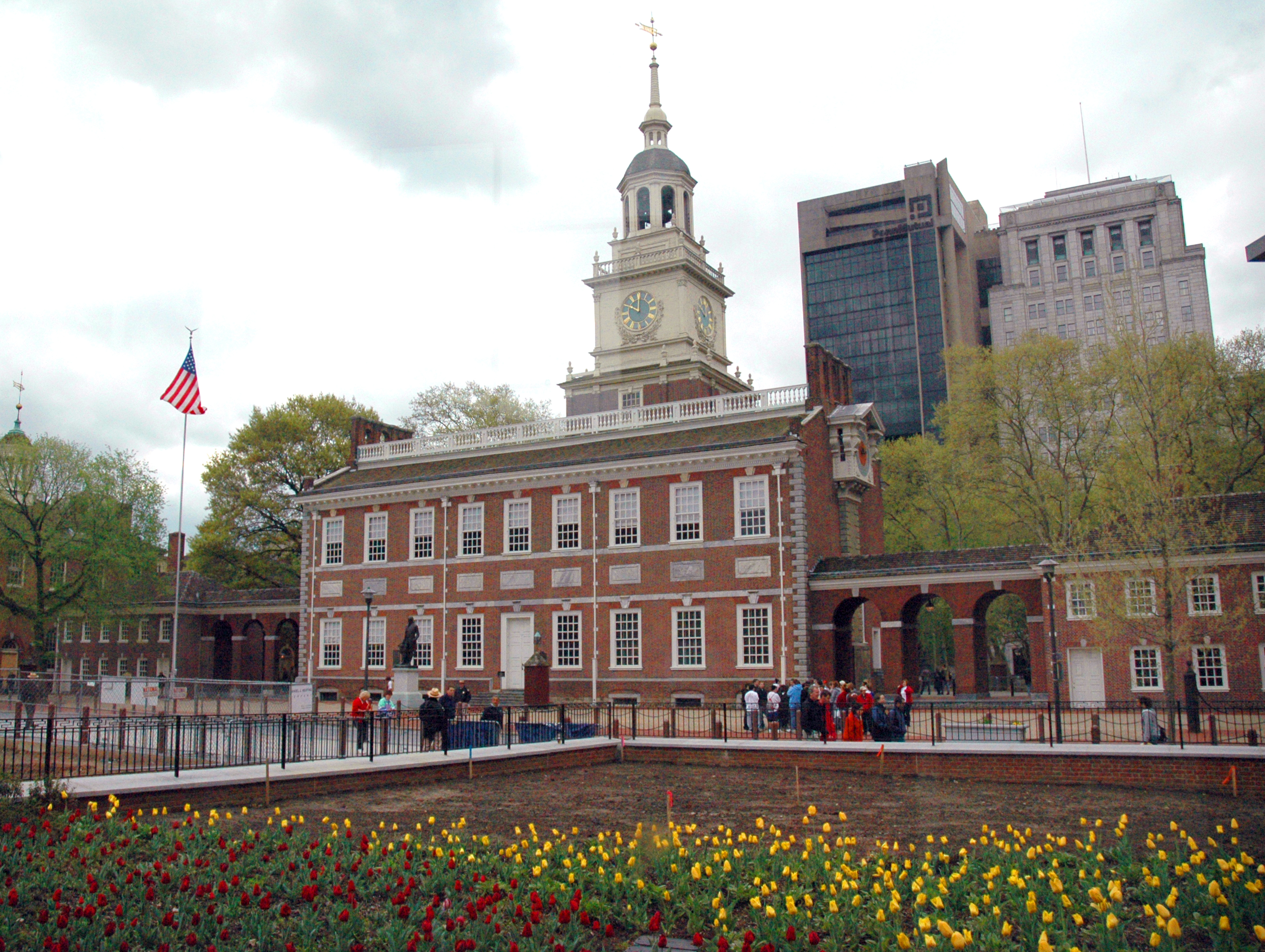
Independence Hall at 520 Chestnut Street

The following comprises a list of sites of interest (attractions) in Philadelphia and its immediate environs:

== Historic sites and national parks ==
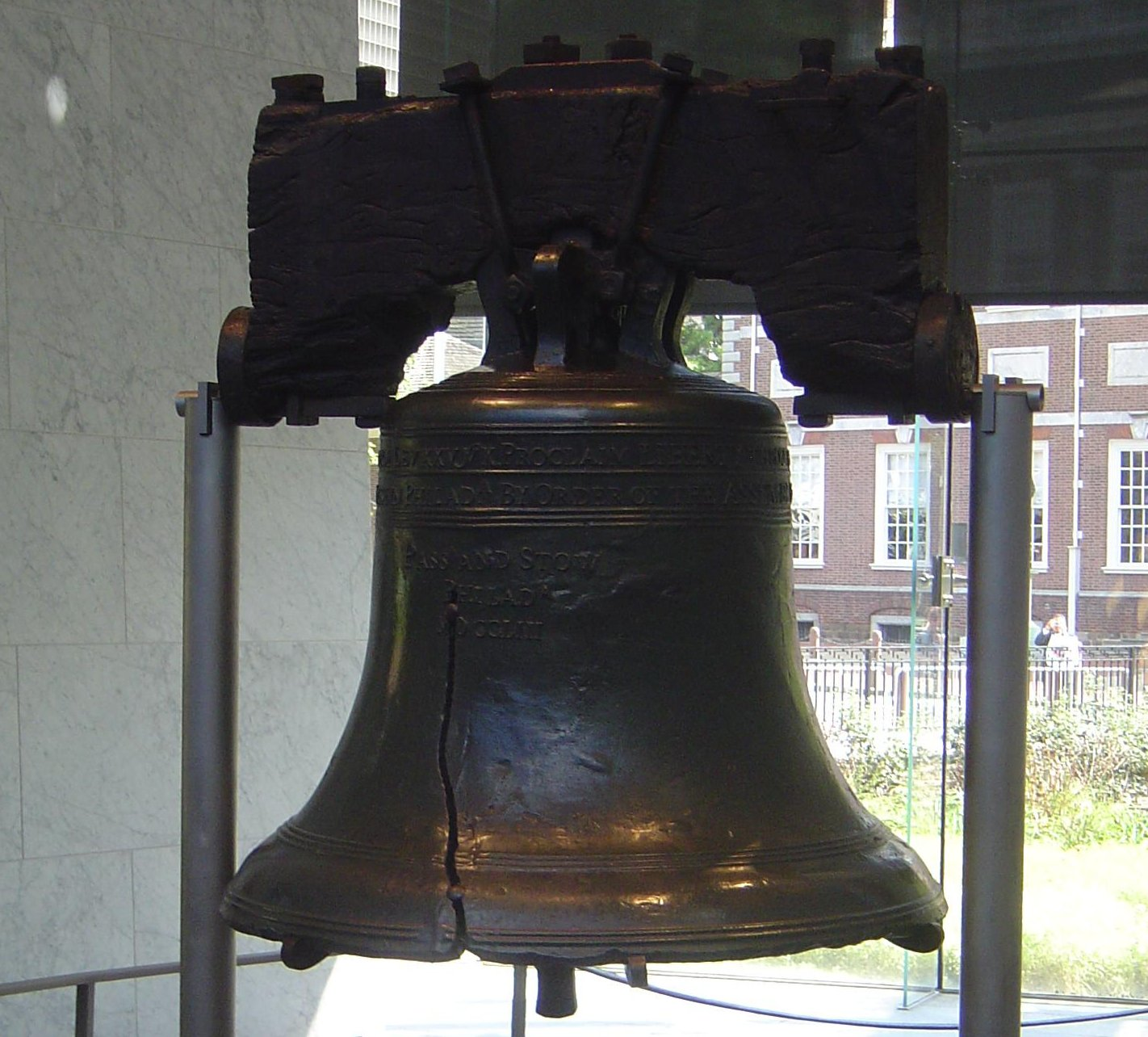
Liberty Bell at Independence National Historical Park at 143 S. 3rd Street

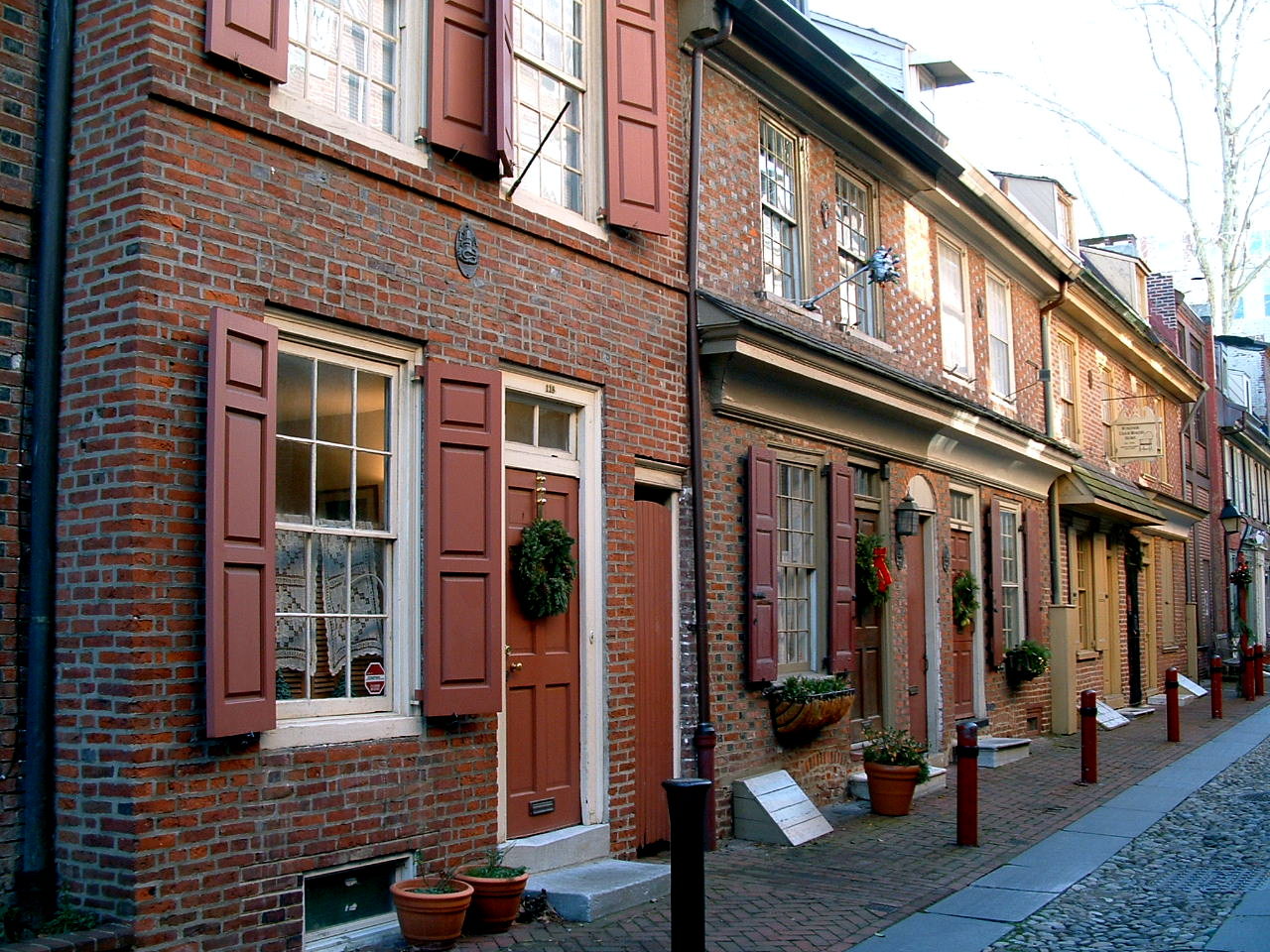
Elfreth's Alley in Old City

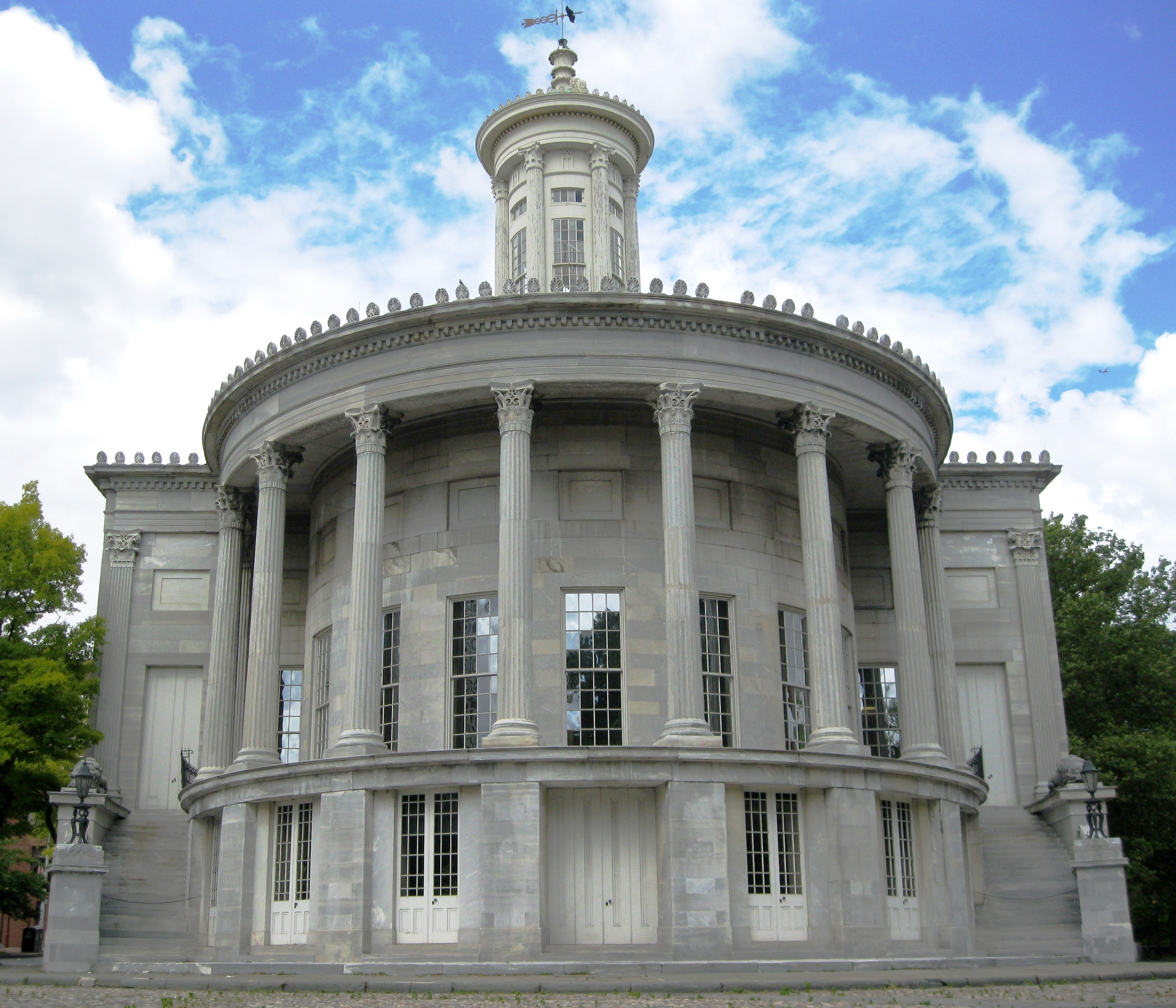
Merchants' Exchange at 143 S. Third Street

- American Philosophical Society Hall
- Belmont Mansion
- Benjamin Franklin National Memorial
- Betsy Ross House
- Carpenters' Hall
- Colonial Germantown Historic District
- Congress Hall
- Ebenezer Maxwell House
- Edgar Allan Poe National Historic Site
- Elfreth's Alley
- Fairmount Water Works
- First Bank of the United States
- Fort Mifflin
- Franklin Court
- Friends Hospital
- Founder's Hall, Girard College
- Gloria Dei (Old Swedes') Church
- Independence Hall
- Independence National Historical Park
- Laurel Hill Cemetery
- Liberty Bell
- Memorial Hall
- Merchants' Exchange
- National Mechanics
- New Market, and the surrounding Head House Square Historic District
- Pennsylvania Hospital
- Philadelphia City Hall
- Philadelphia Naval Asylum
- Second Bank of the United States
- Thaddeus Kosciuszko National Memorial
- University of Pennsylvania central campus

== Museums ==
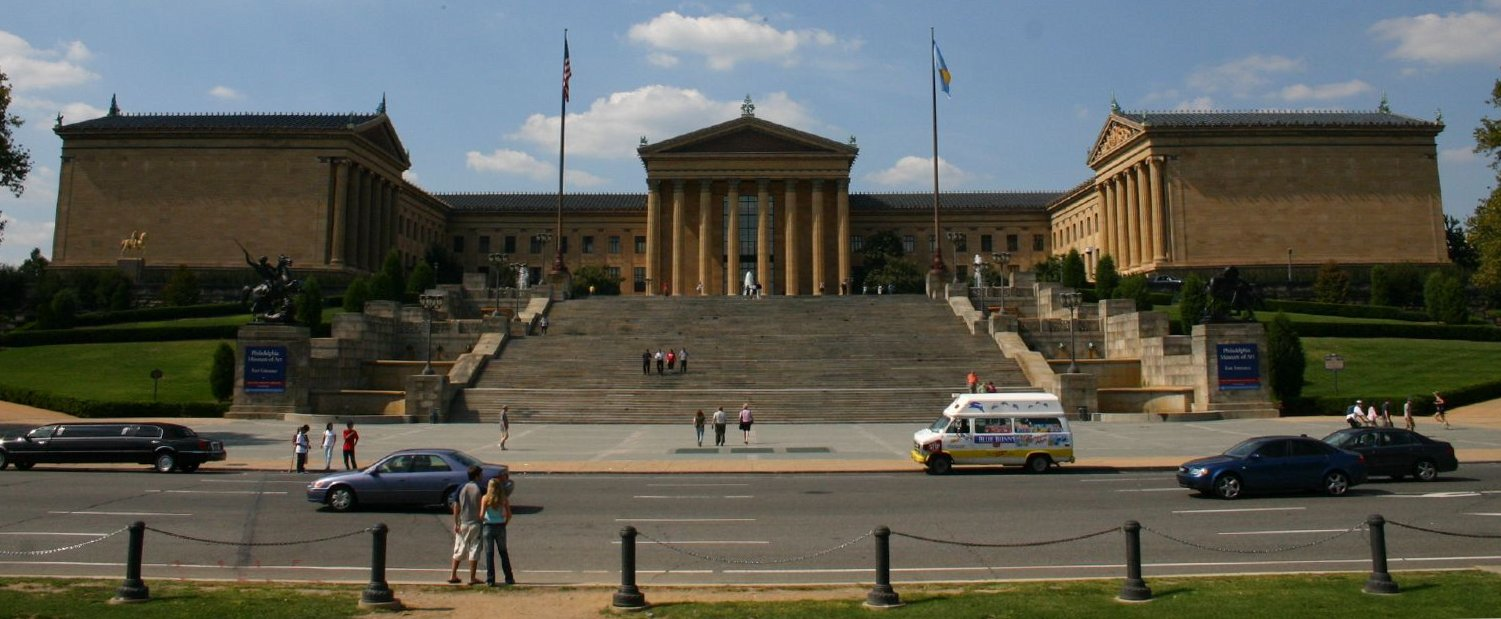
Philadelphia Museum of Art at 2600 Benjamin Franklin

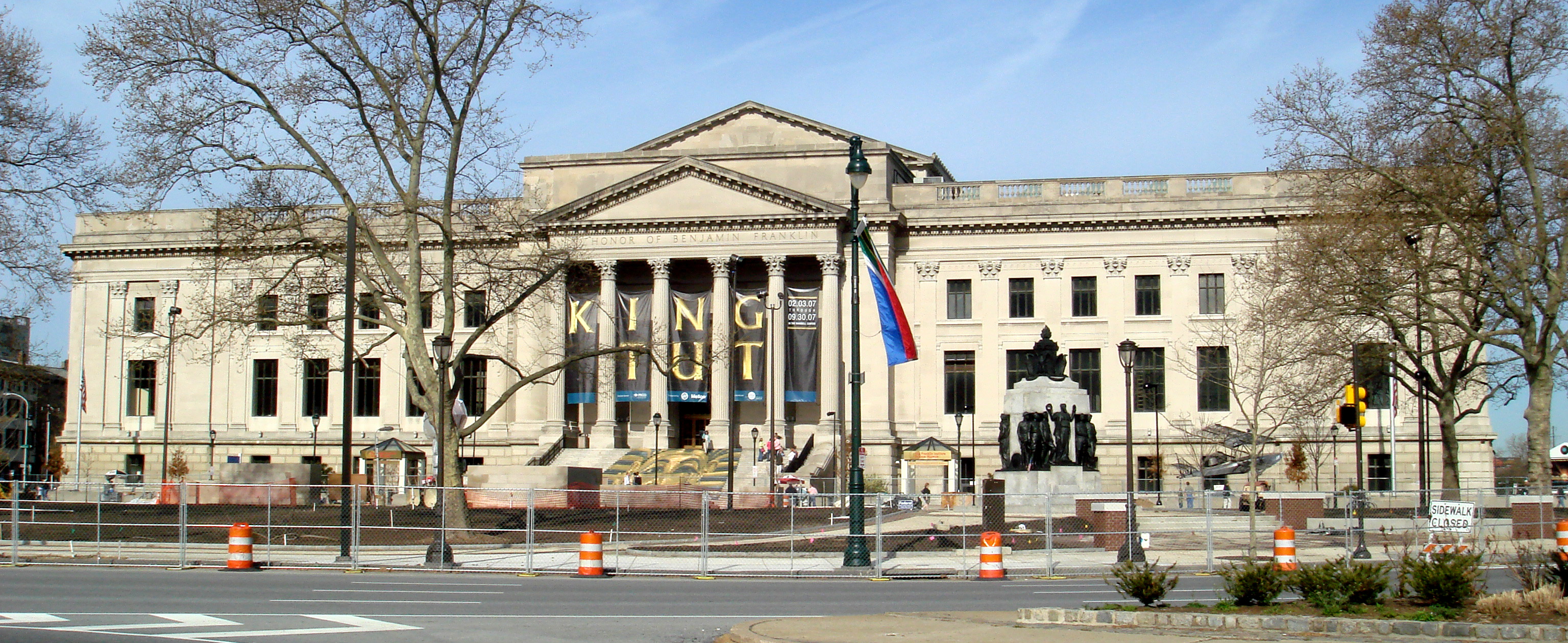
Franklin Institute at 222 N. 20th Street

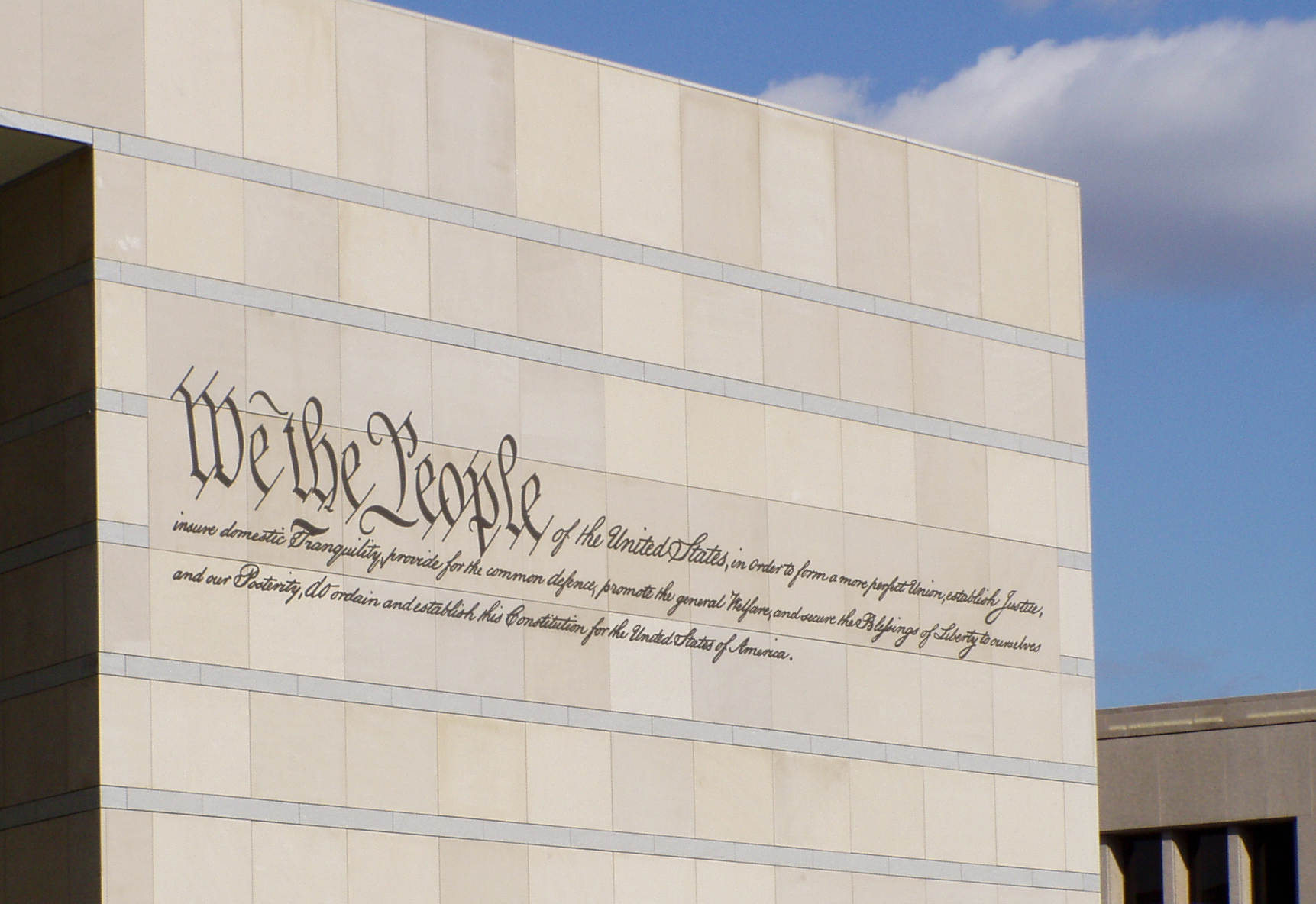
National Constitution Center at Independence National Historical Park at 143 S. 3rd Street

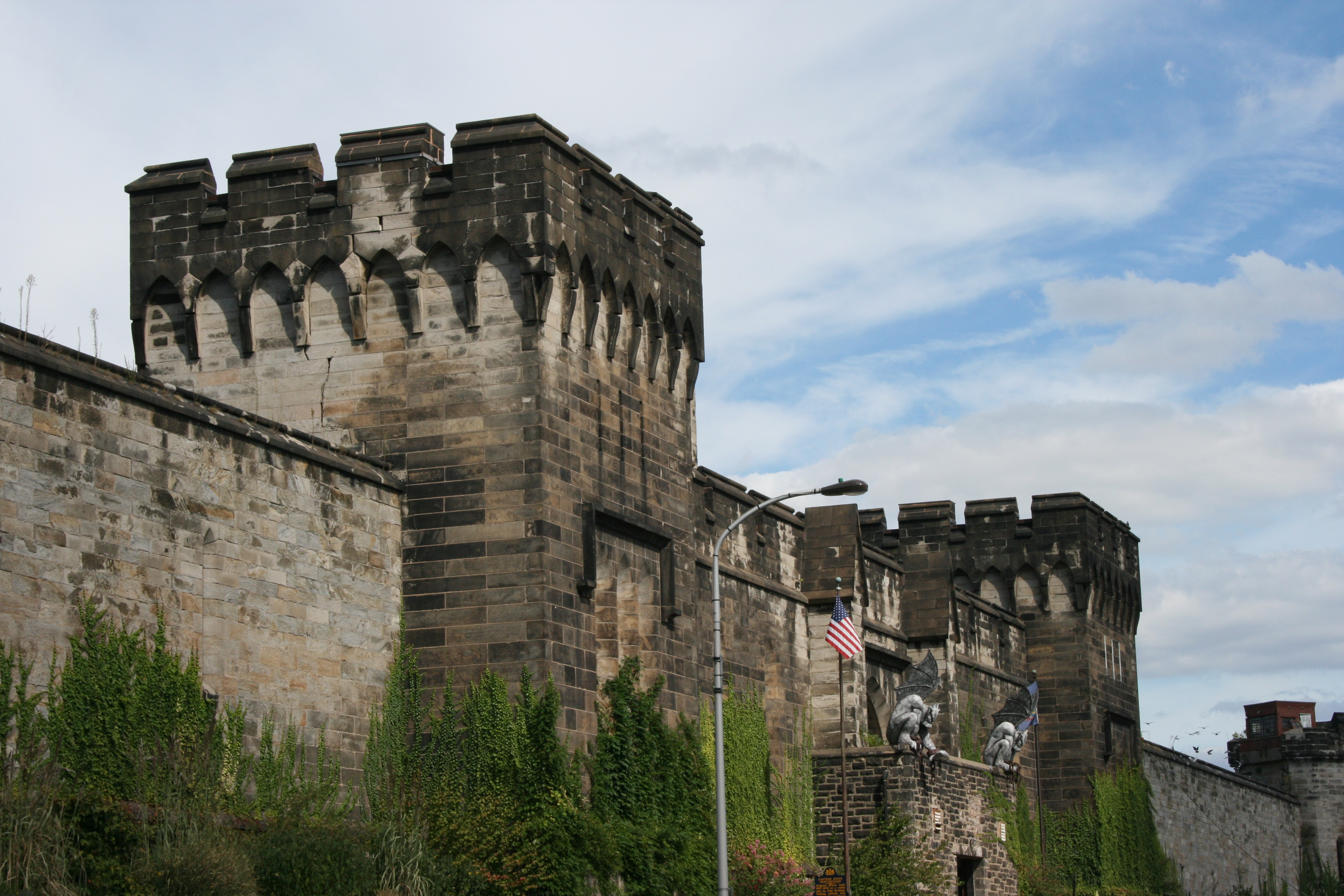
Eastern State Penitentiary at 2027 Fairmount Avenue

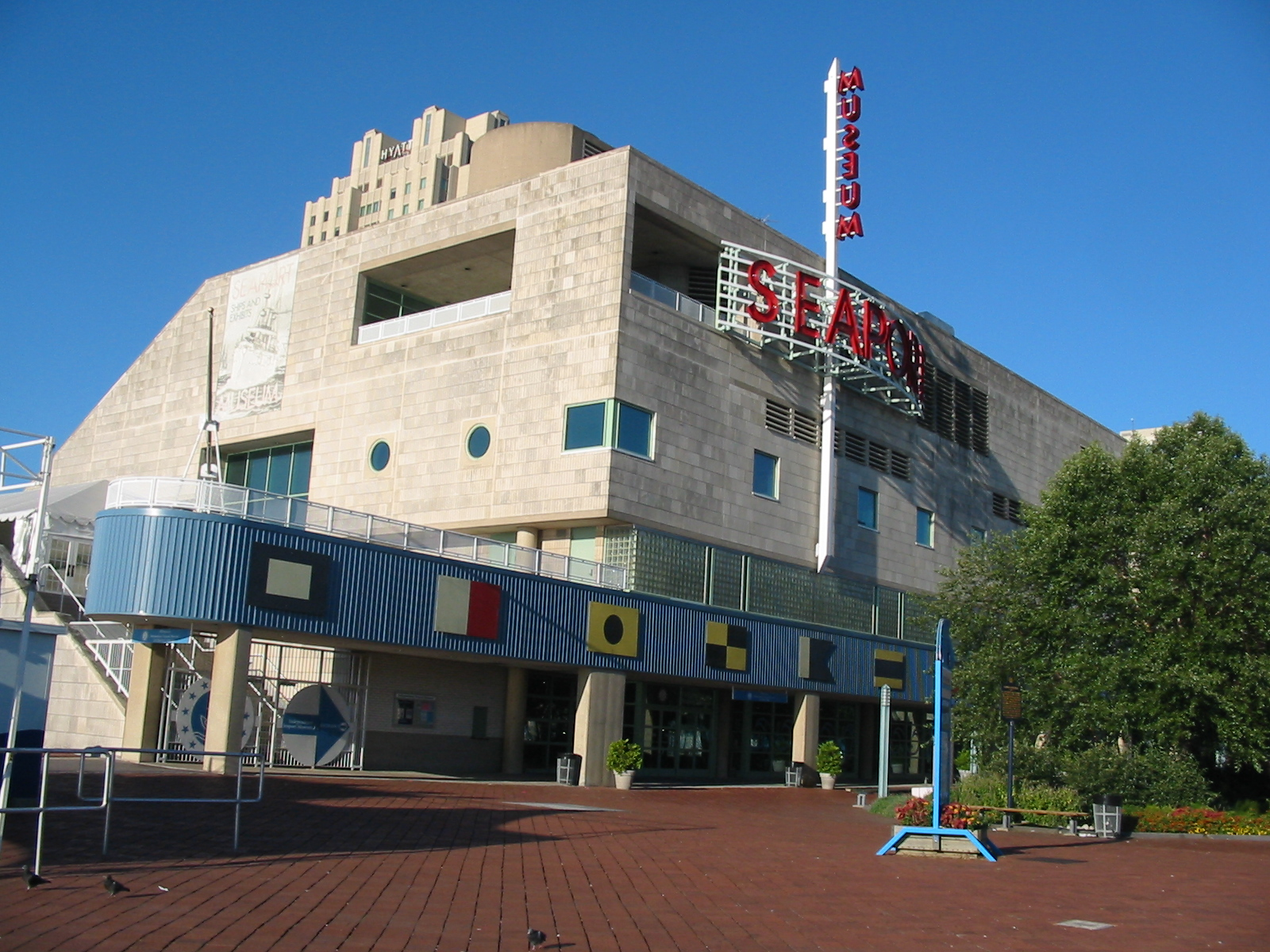
Independence Seaport Museum at Penn's Landing

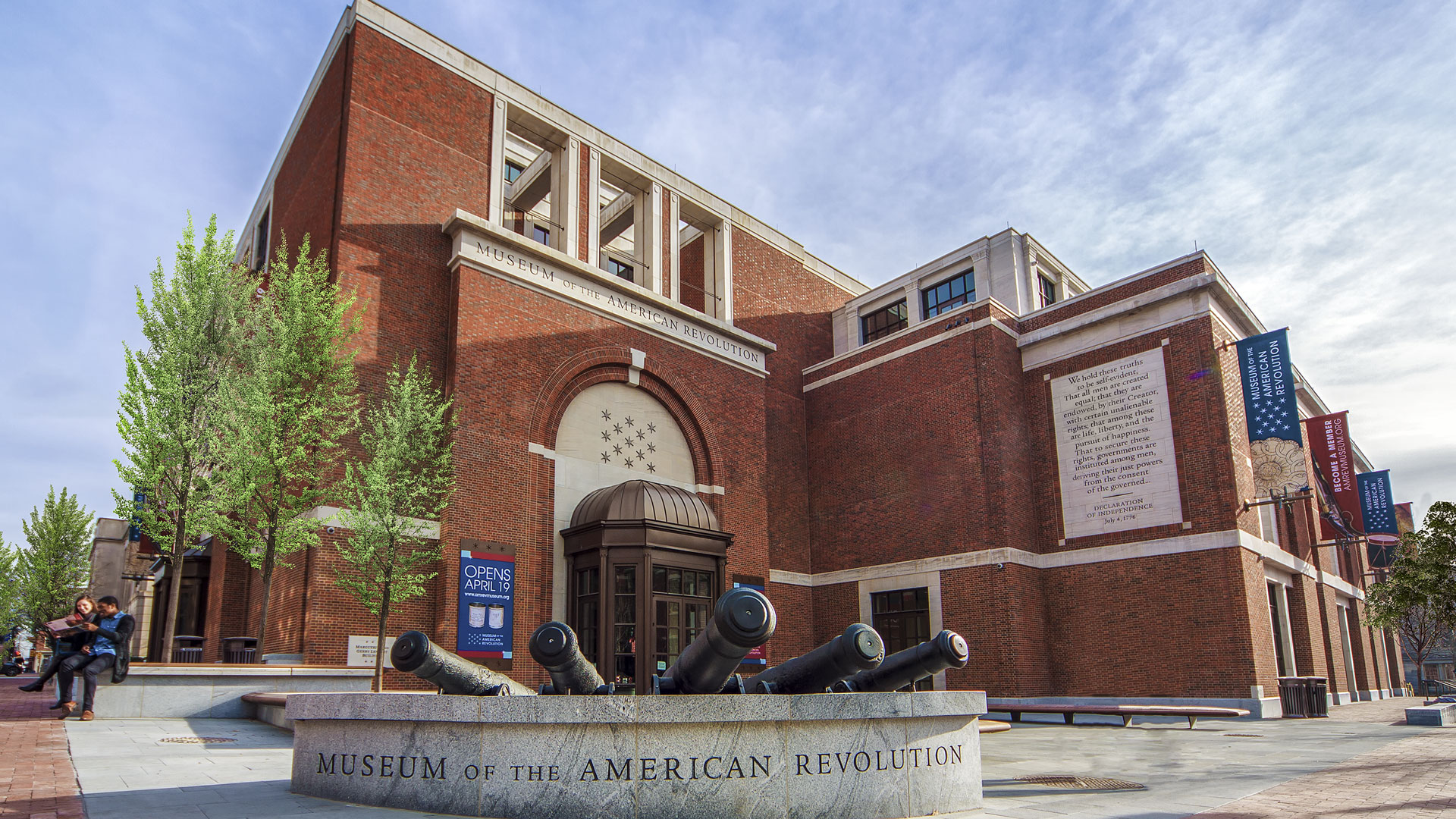
Museum of the American Revolution at 101 South Third Street

=== Art ===
- Barnes Foundation
- Institute of Contemporary Art, Philadelphia
- La Salle University Art Museum
- Pennsylvania Academy of the Fine Arts
- Philadelphia Museum of Art
  - Perelman Building
- Rodin Museum
- University of Pennsylvania Museum of Archaeology and Anthropology
- Woodmere Art Museum

=== Science ===
- Academy of Natural Sciences
- Franklin Institute
- Insectarium
- Mütter Museum
- Science History Institute
- Wagner Free Institute of Science

=== History ===
- African American Museum in Philadelphia
- American Swedish Historical Museum
- Civil War Museum of Philadelphia
- Elfreth's Alley
- Grand Army of the Republic Civil War Museum and Library
- Historical Society of Frankford
- Historical Society of Pennsylvania
- Museum of the American Revolution
- National Constitution Center
- National Liberty Museum
- National Museum of American Jewish History
- Philadelphia History Museum

=== Historic houses ===
- Belmont Mansion
- Betsy Ross House
- Bishop White House
- Cliveden
- Dolley Todd House
- Ebenezer Maxwell Mansion
- Elfreth's Alley Museum
- Germantown White House
- Glen Foerd on the Delaware
- Grumblethorpe
- Hill-Keith-Physick House
- Historic RittenhouseTown
- Historic Strawberry Mansion
- John Johnson House
- Lemon Hill
- Marian Anderson Museum and Birthplace
- Mount Pleasant
- Powel House
- Ryerss Museum and Library
- Stenton
- Sweetbriar
- Upsala
- Woodford
- Wyck House

=== Other ===
- Athenaeum of Philadelphia
- Concord School House
- Eastern State Penitentiary
- The Fabric Workshop and Museum
- Free Library of Philadelphia
- Library Company of Philadelphia
- Living Loft Puppet Museum
- Mario Lanza Museum
- Masonic Library and Museum of Pennsylvania
- Mummers Museum
- National Shrine of Saint John Neumann
- Philadelphia Doll Museum
- Please Touch Museum
- Polish American Cultural Center Museum
- Romanian Folk Art Museum
- Rosenbach Museum & Library
- SEPTA Museum
- Shofuso Japanese House and Garden
- Simeone Foundation Automotive Museum
- The Saint James, high rise apartment incorporating the 1869 PFSF Building and York Row
- USS Becuna (SS-319)
- USS Olympia (C-6)

=== Galleries ===
- Arthur Ross Gallery at the University of Pennsylvania
- Center for Art in Wood
- The Design Center of Philadelphia University
- Drexel University Collection
- Fleisher Art Memorial
- The Galleries at Moore College
- Painted Bride Art Center
- Paradigm Gallery and Studio
- Philadelphia Art Alliance
- Philadelphia's Magic Gardens
- The Print Center
- Tyler School of Art

== Outdoors ==
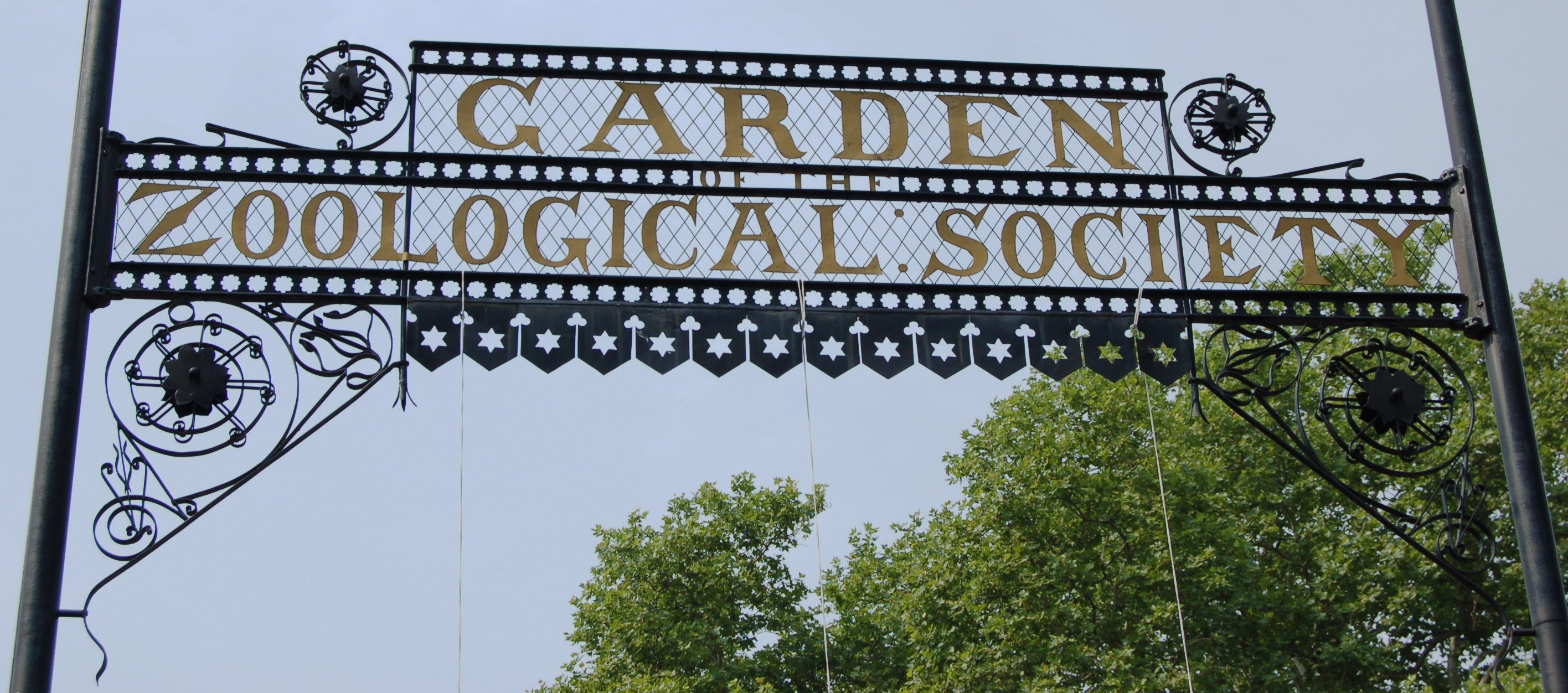
Entrance to the Philadelphia Zoo at 3400 W Girard Avenue

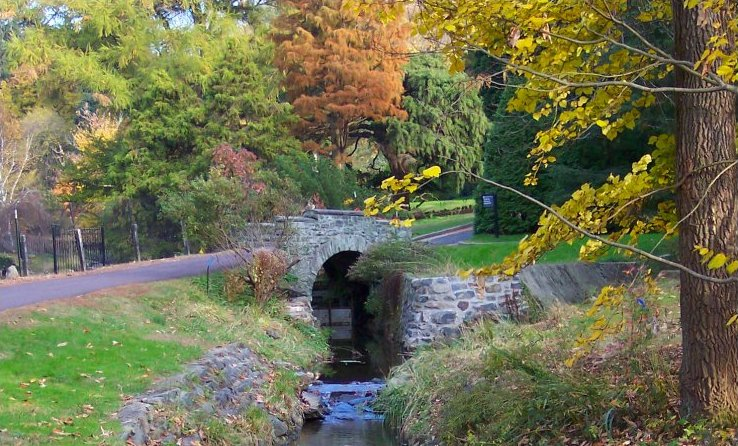
Morris Arboretum at 100 East Northwestern Avenue

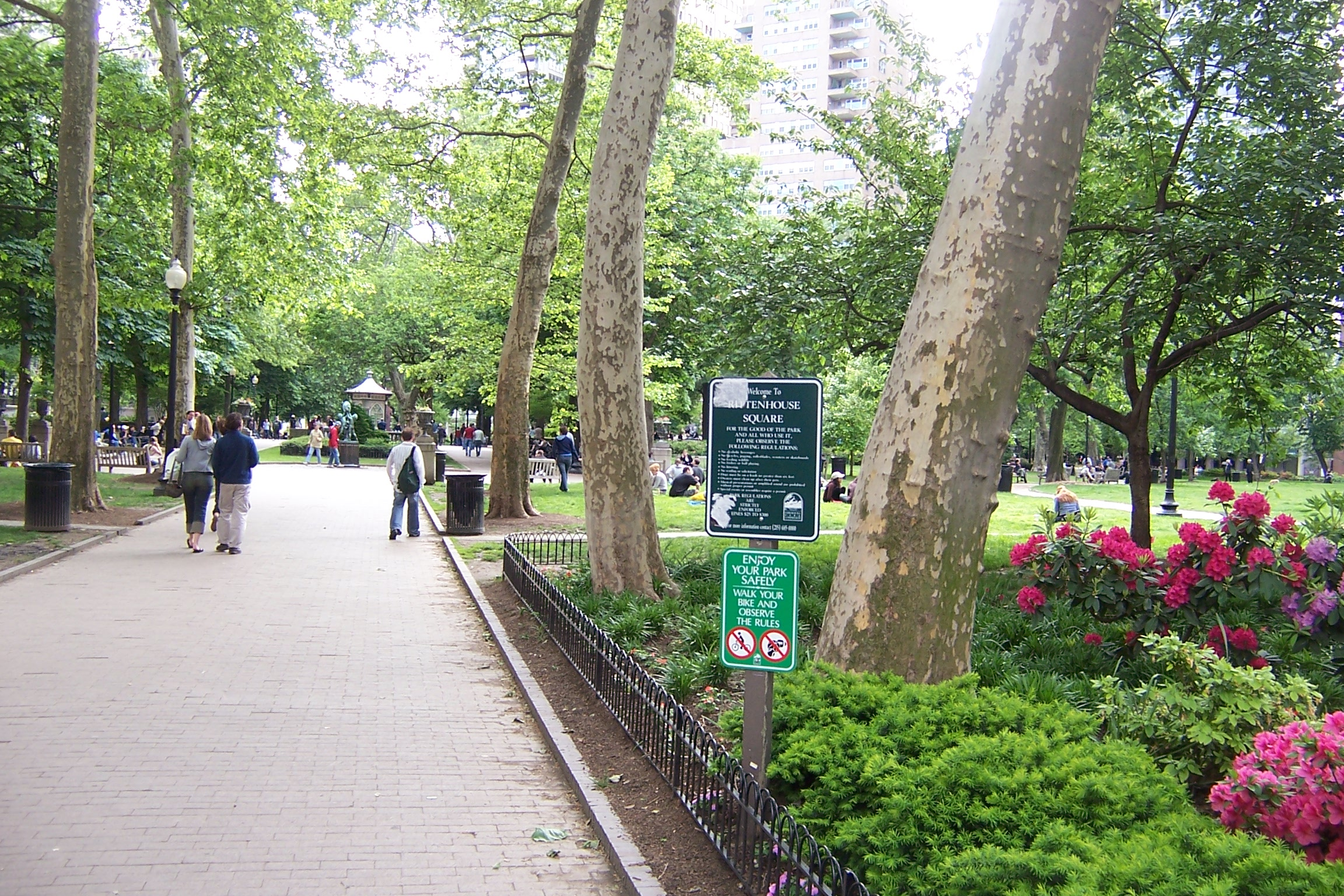
Rittenhouse Square in Center City

=== Animal life institutions ===
- Adventure Aquarium (in Camden, New Jersey)
- John Heinz National Wildlife Refuge at Tinicum
- Philadelphia Zoo
- The Schuylkill Center

=== Horticultural institutions ===
- Awbury Arboretum
- Bartram's Garden
- Centennial Arboretum
- The Horticulture Center
- Marconi Plaza
- Morris Arboretum

=== Parks and squares ===
- Clark Park
- Fairmount Park
- Franklin Square
- Logan Circle
- LOVE Park
- Penn's Landing
- Rittenhouse Square
- Washington Square and Tomb of the Unknown Soldier

== Performing arts centers ==
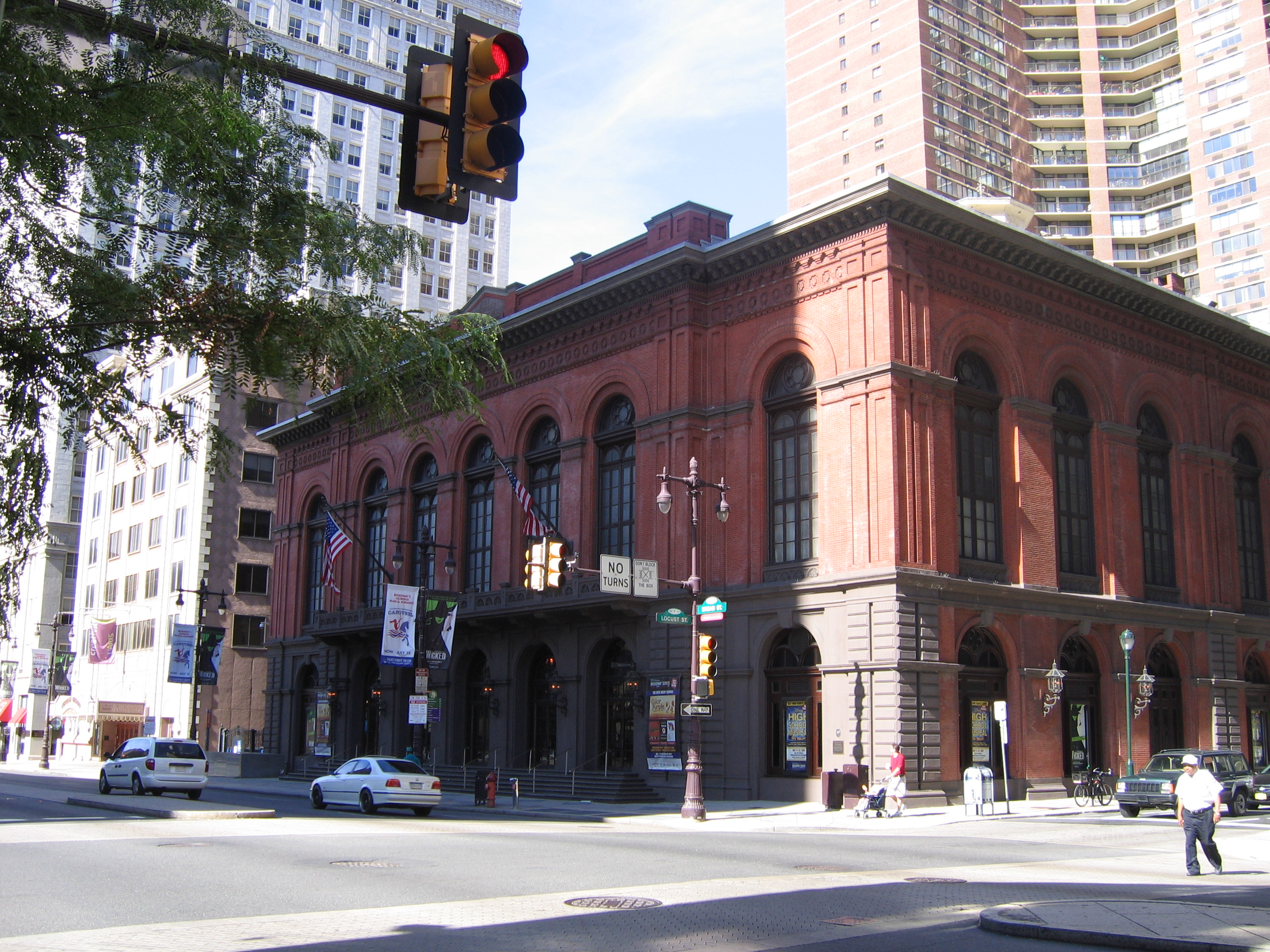
Academy of Music at 240 South Broad Street

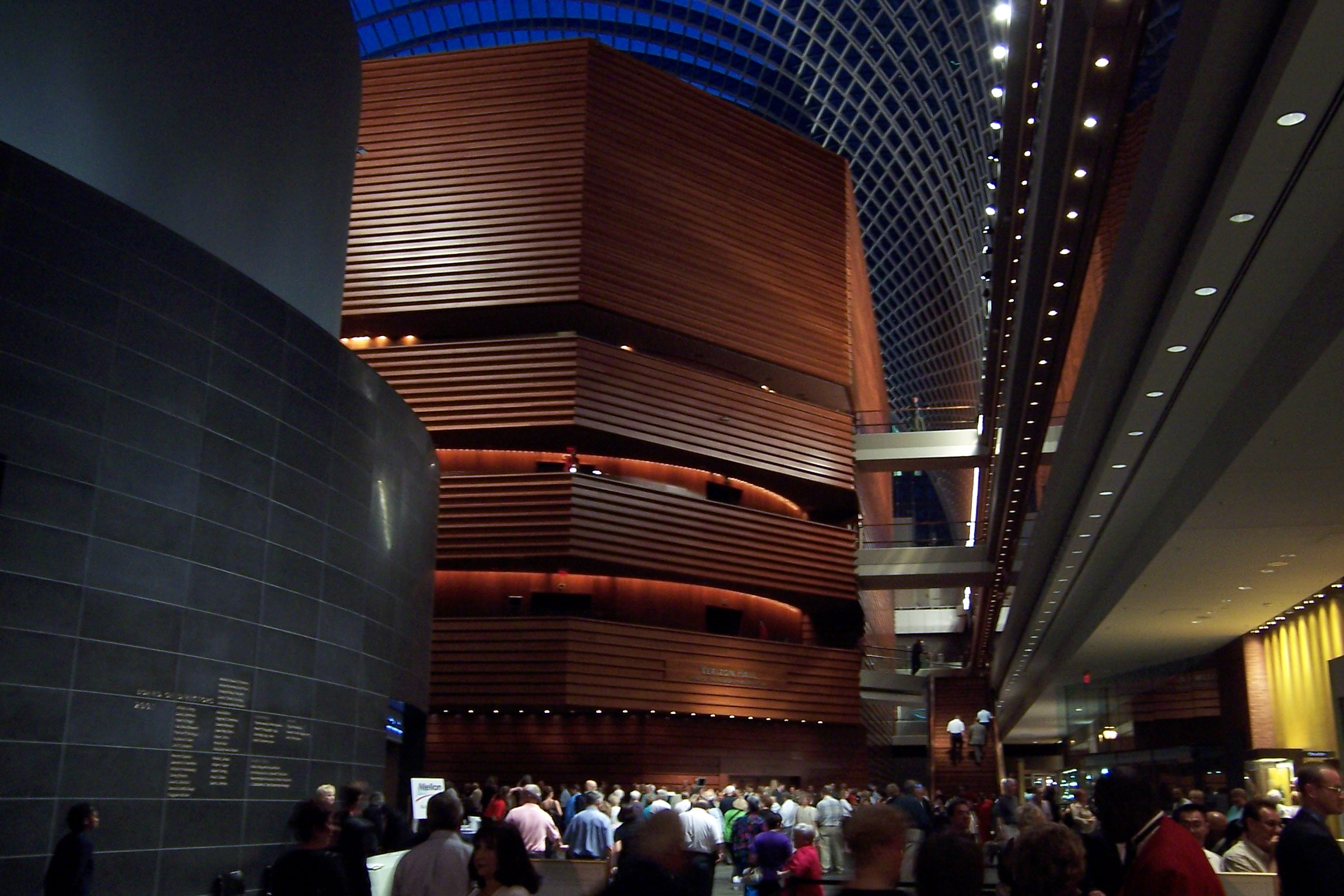
Kimmel Center for the Performing Arts at 300 South Broad Street

=== Professional ===
- Academy of Music – opera, ballet
- Forrest Theatre – plays, musicals
- Franklin Music Hall – popular music
- Kimmel Center for the Performing Arts – classical music
- Mann Center for the Performing Arts – summer venue, classical and popular music
- Miller Theater – Broadway and a variety of performance arts theater
- Plays and Players Theatre – plays, musicals
- Prince Music Theater – various
- Susquehanna Bank Center in Camden, New Jersey – popular music
- Suzanne Roberts Theatre – plays, musicals
- The TLA (formerly the Theater of the Living Arts) – popular music
- Tower Theater in Upper Darby Township – popular music
- Trocadero Theatre – popular musical acts
- Walnut Street Theatre – plays, musicals
- Wilma Theater – plays, musicals

=== Educational ===
- Annenberg Center for the Performing Arts, University of Pennsylvania – various
- Arts Bank, University of the Arts – dance, student performances
- Curtis Opera Studio, Curtis Institute of Music – opera
- Field Concert Hall, Curtis Institute of Music – classical music
- Helen Corning Warden Theater, Academy of Vocal Arts – opera
- Irvine Auditorium, University of Pennsylvania – features a pipe organ
- Main Auditorium, Drexel University – site of the 2007 Democratic debate; features a pipe organ
- Mandell Theater, Drexel University
- Miller Theater, University of the Arts – various

== Religious buildings ==
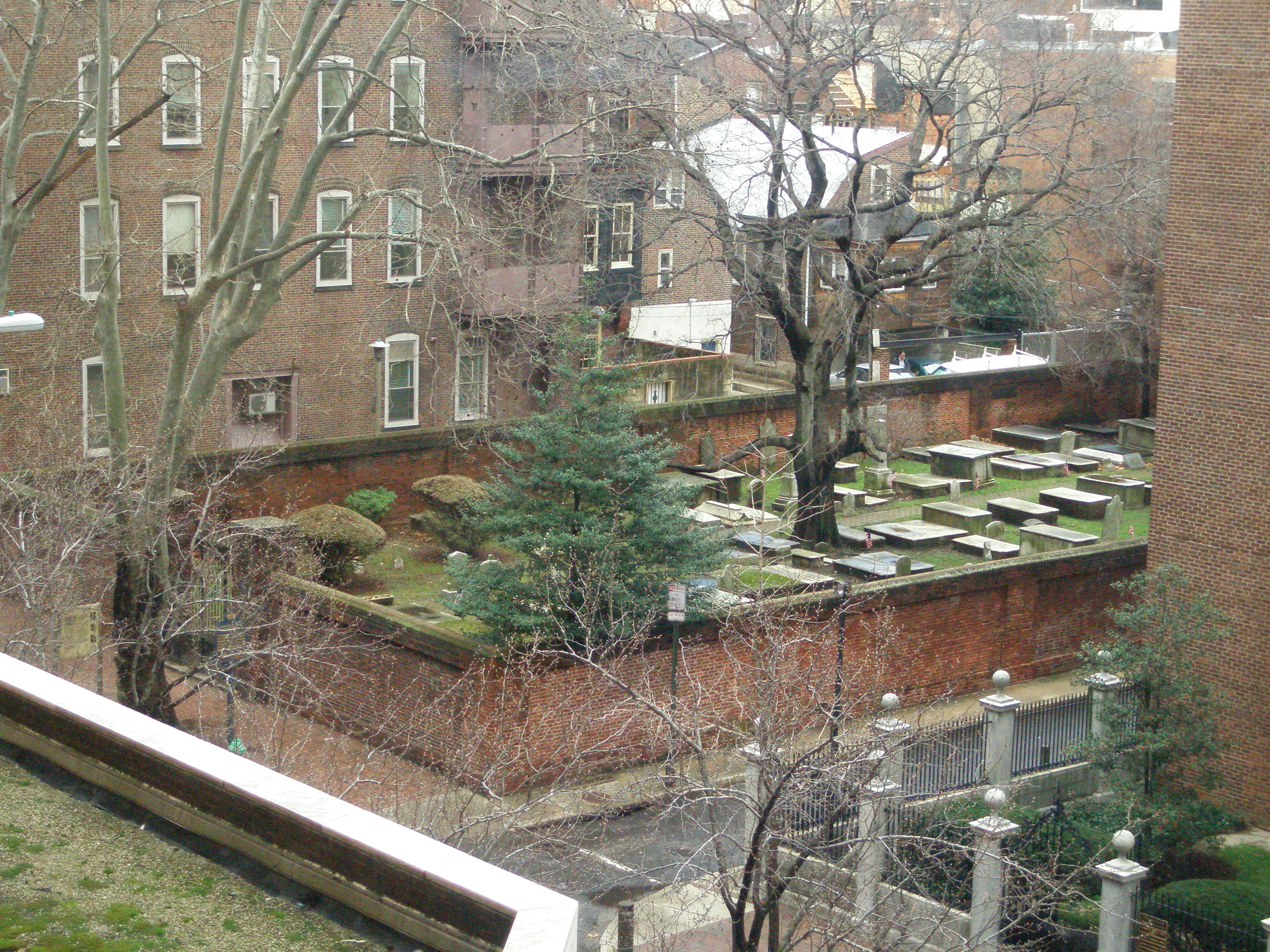
Mikveh Israel Cemetery at 831 Spruce Street

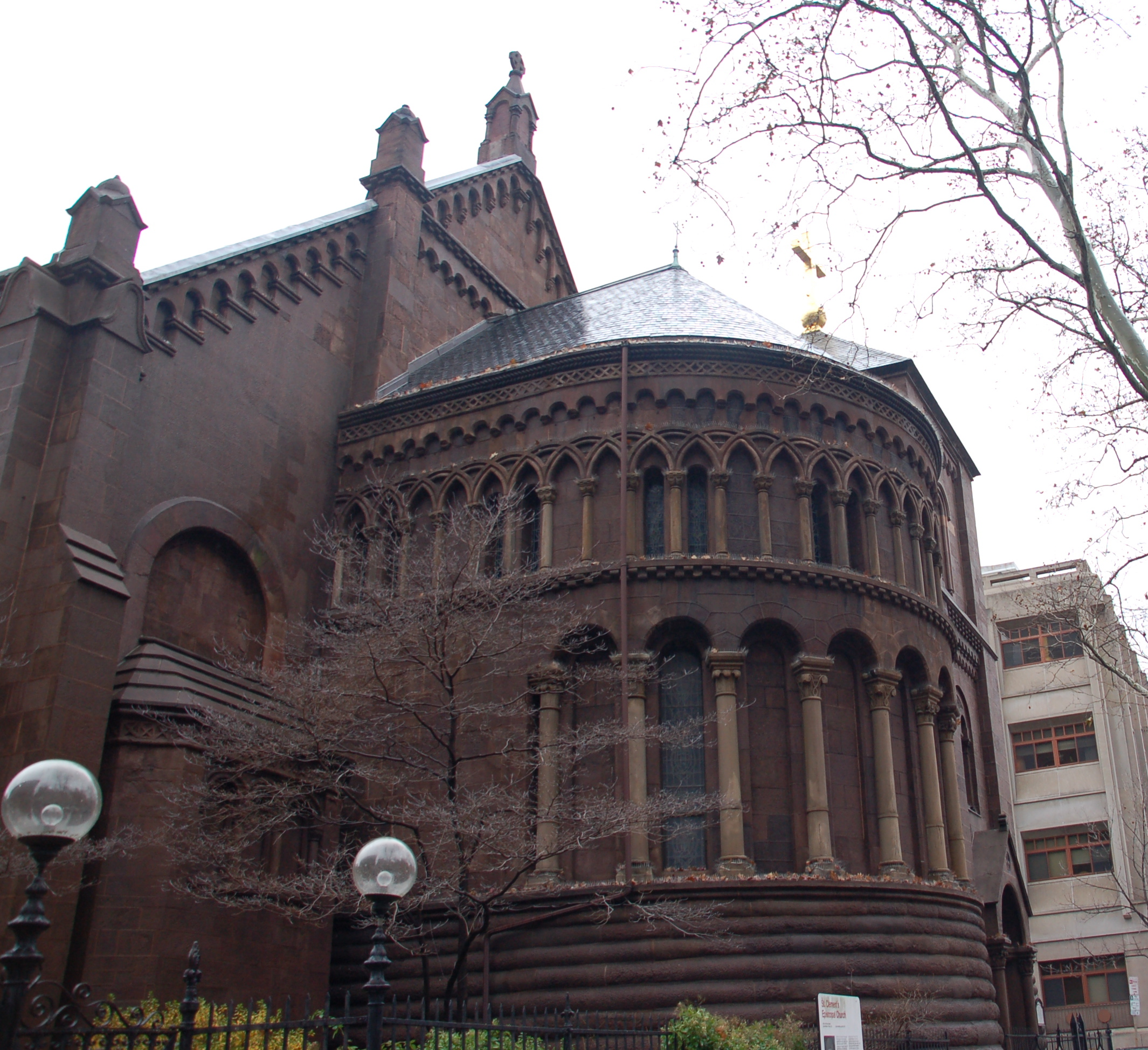
Saint Clement's Church at 2013 Appletree Street

- Arch Street Friends Meeting House
- Beth Sholom Synagogue in Elkins Park
- Cathedral Basilica of Saints Peter and Paul
- Christ Church
- Church of the Advocate
- Church of St. James the Less
- Congregation Mikveh Israel
- Gloria Dei (Old Swedes') Church
- Mikveh Israel Synagogue
- Mother Bethel A.M.E. Church
- National Shrine of Saint John Neumann
- Race Street Friends Meetinghouse
- Saint Clement's Church
- St. Mark's Episcopal Church
- St. Peter's Church

== Shopping areas ==
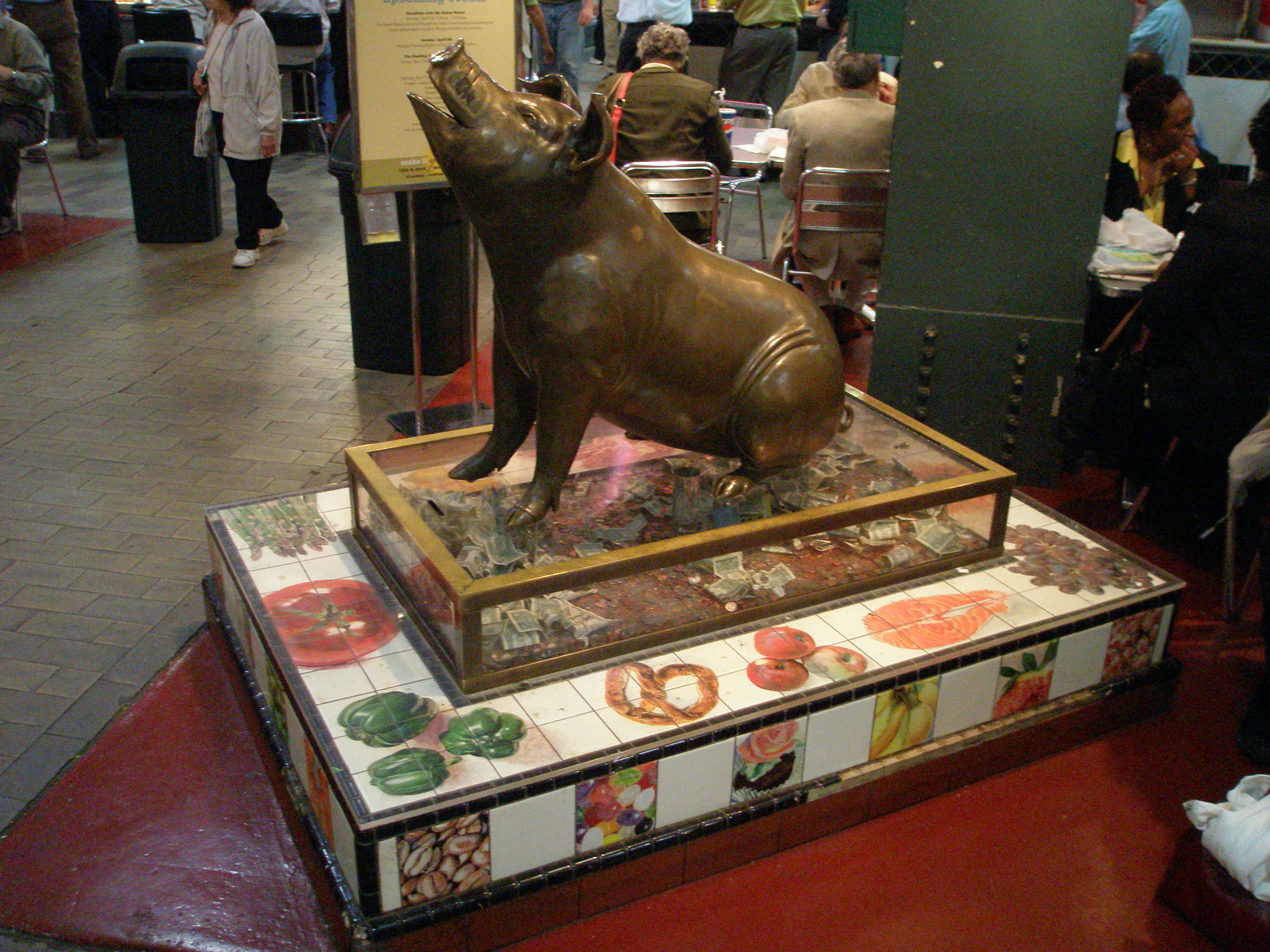
Philbert at the Reading Terminal Market at 12th and Arch Streets

- Chinatown
- Fashion District Philadelphia – shopping mall in Center City
- Italian Market – open produce and meat market with many specialty shops
- Jewelers' Row – two densely packed blocks of jewelers and related shops
- Philadelphia Mills – a large outlet and discount shopping mall in the Far Northeast section
- Reading Terminal Market – large enclosed produce, meat and prepared food market featuring some Pennsylvania Dutch merchants and others
- The Shops at Liberty Place – upscale shopping mall inside the skyscraper complex known as Liberty Place
- South Street – many trendy and counterculture shops between Front and 10th Streets
- Walnut Street – many expensive shops between Broad and 20th Streets and the surrounding area
- Wanamaker's (now Macy's) – defined the department store and remains a landmark; features the Wanamaker Organ

== Sports venues ==
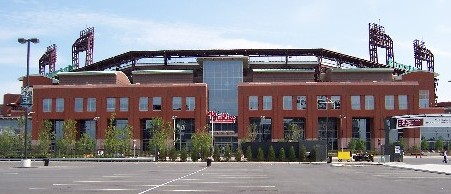
Citizens Bank Park in South Philadelphia

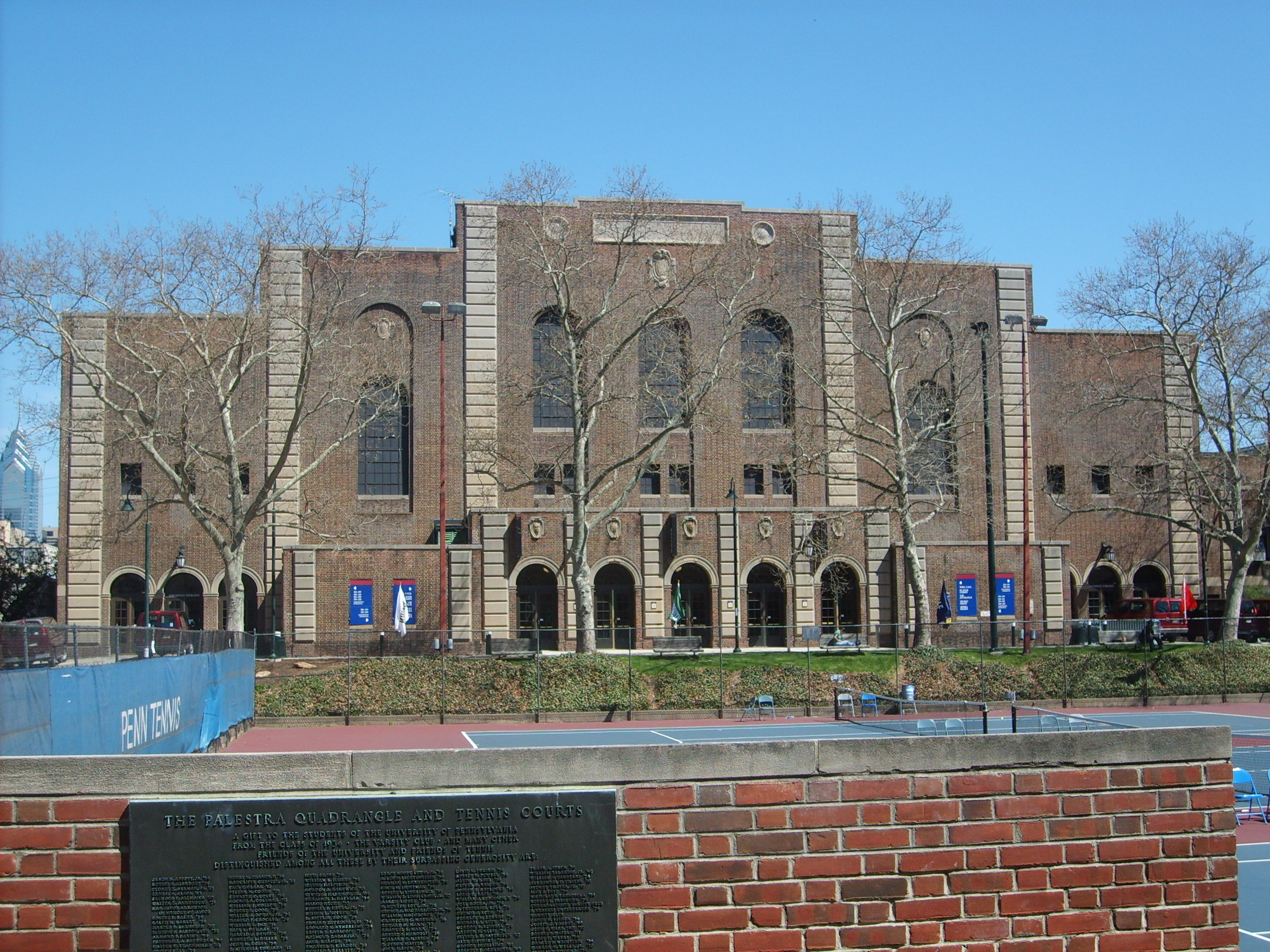
The Palestra at 235 South 33rd Street

=== Professional ===
- 2300 Arena – boxing, wrestling, MMA
- Citizens Bank Park – Philadelphia Phillies
- Lincoln Financial Field – Philadelphia Eagles and Temple Owls football
- Xfinity Mobile Arena – Philadelphia Flyers and Philadelphia 76ers

=== Collegiate ===
- Boathouse Row – collegiate and amateur rowing
- Daskalakis Athletic Center – Drexel University
- Franklin Field – University of Pennsylvania
- Hagan Arena – Saint Joseph's University
- Hayman Center – LaSalle University
- Liacouras Center – Temple University
- McCarthy Stadium – LaSalle University
- The Palestra – University of Pennsylvania
- Villanova Stadium in Villanova – Villanova University

== Eateries ==
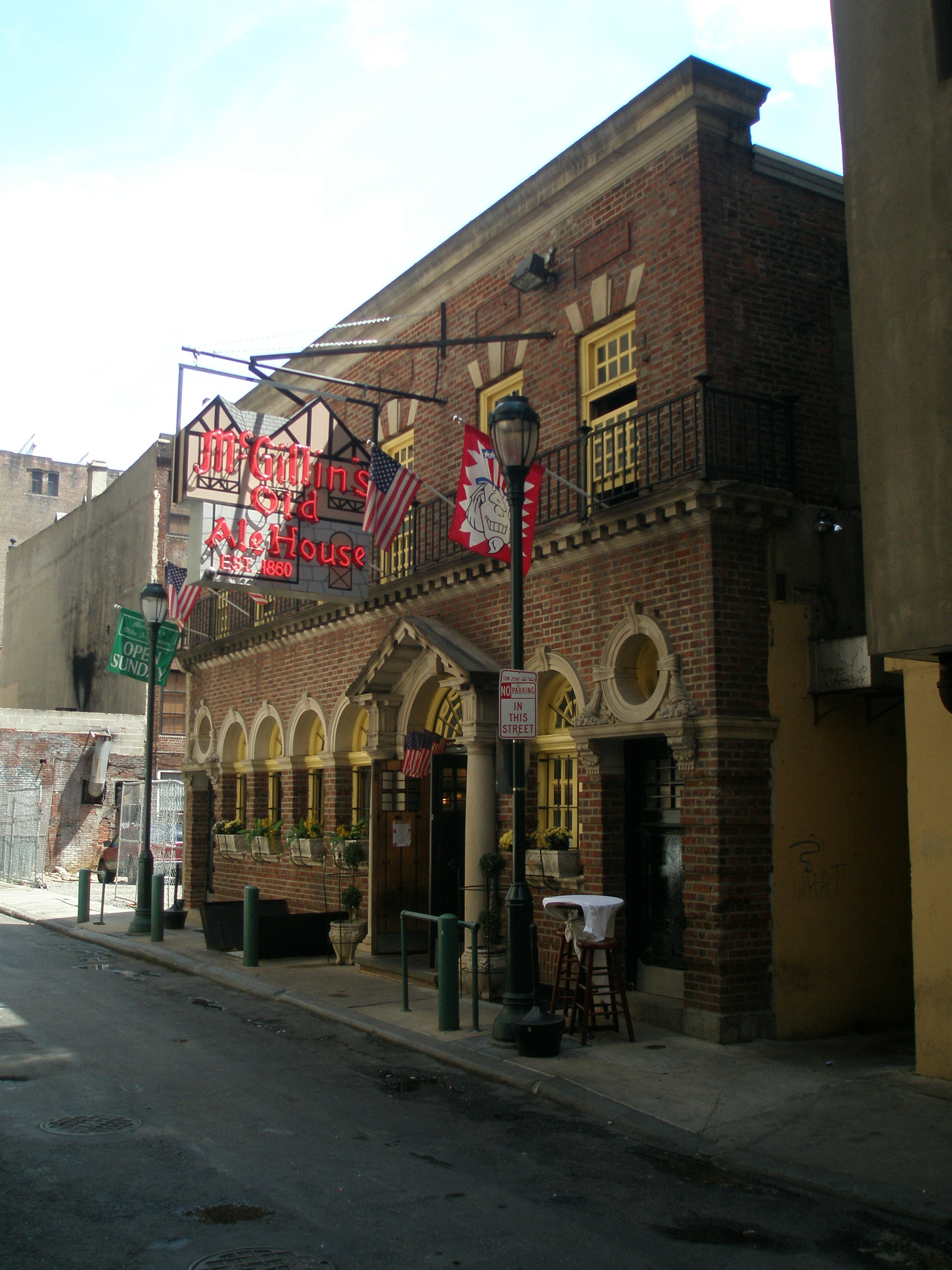
McGillin's Olde Ale House at 13th and South Juniper Streets in Center City

- Amada Restaurant – owned by Jose Garces, Philadelphia's newest Iron Chef
- The Fountain Restaurant – the Four Season Hotel, rated #1 in the city by Zagat Survey
- Geno's Steaks – of the "Geno's vs. Pat's" debate
- McGillin's Olde Ale House – the oldest continuously operational tavern in Philadelphia
- Morimoto – the original Iron Chef's restaurant
- Moshulu - a converted 1904 sailing ship.
- Pat's King of Steaks – created the cheesesteak

== Railroad ==
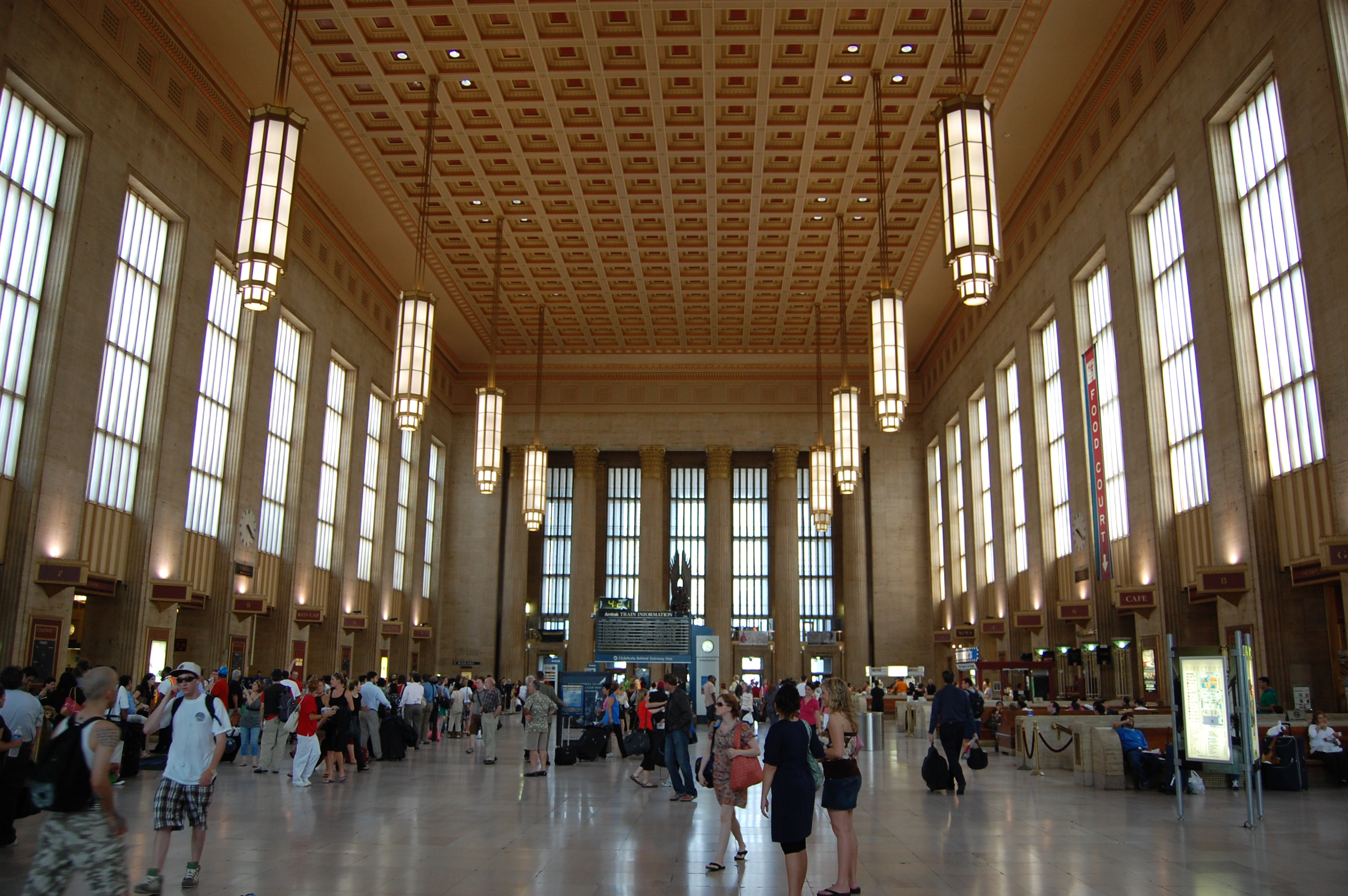
30th Street Station's main waiting room

- 30th Street Station
- Reading Terminal
- Suburban Station

== Maritime ==
The SS United States still holds a speed record for trans-Atlantic crossing.

- Gazela Primeiro
- Independence Seaport Museum
- Philadelphia Naval Shipyard
- USS New Jersey (BB-62) (in Camden, New Jersey)
- SS United States

== Miscellaneous ==
- Toynbee tiles

== See also ==
- Architecture of Philadelphia
- Culture of Philadelphia
- List of church buildings in Philadelphia
- List of museums in Pennsylvania
- List of National Historic Landmarks in Pennsylvania
- List of National Historic Landmarks in Philadelphia
- List of public art in Philadelphia
- List of National Register of Historic Places in Philadelphia
- Philadelphia Register of Historic Places
