= Friends Hospital =

- U.S. National Register of Historic Places
- U.S. National Historic Landmark District
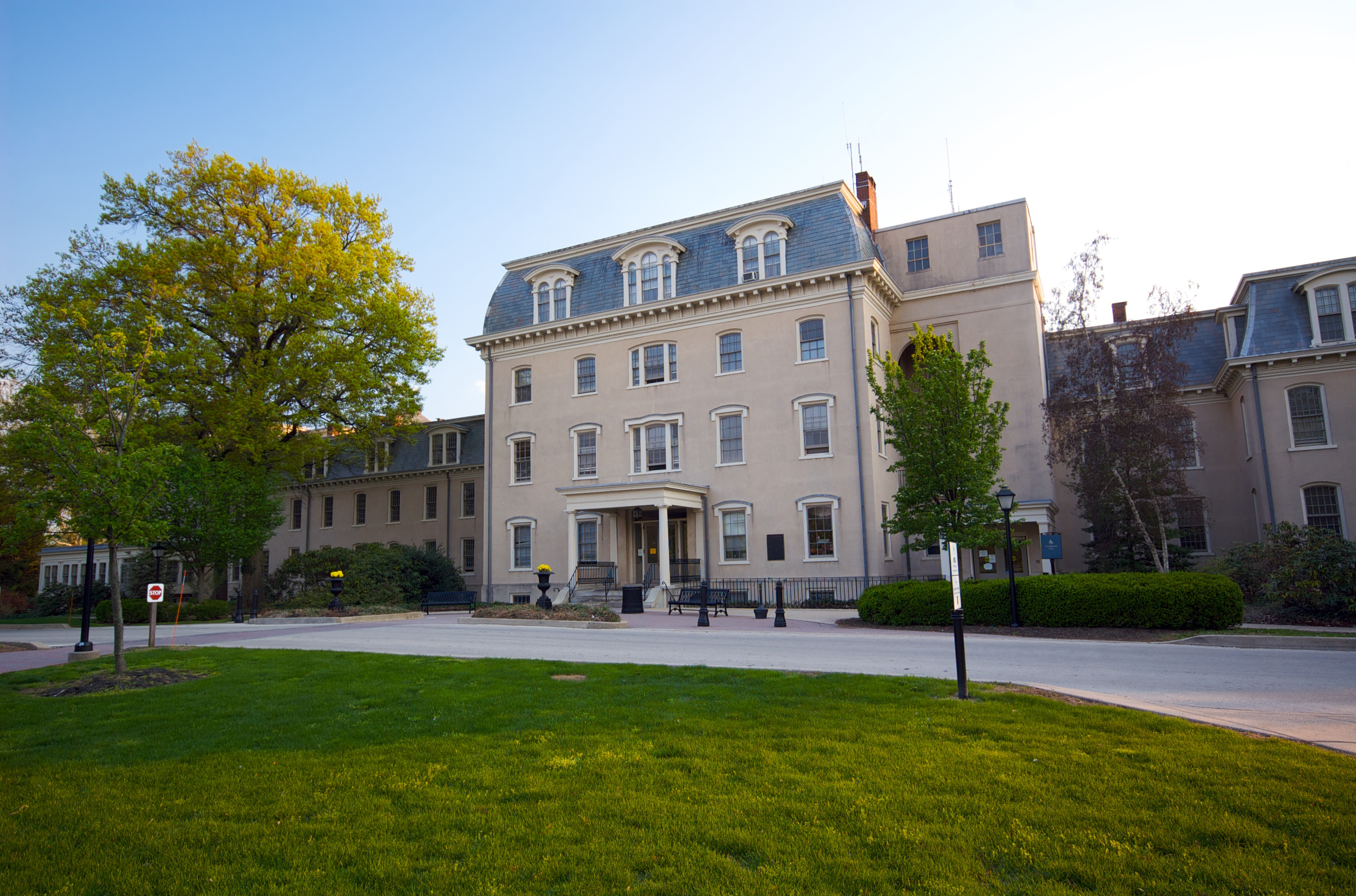
- Friends Hospital in 2010
- Location: 4641 Roosevelt Boulevard, Frankford, Philadelphia, Pennsylvania
- Coordinates: 40°1′36.25″N 75°5′59.1″W
- Area: 100 acres (40 ha)
- Built: 1813
- NRHP reference No.: 99000629

Significant dates
- Added to NRHP: January 20, 1999
- Designated NHLD: January 20, 1999

Friends Hospital
- Type: Psychiatric hospital
- Founded: 1813
- Headquarters: Philadelphia, Pennsylvania
- Website: https://friendshospital.com/

Friends Hospital is a psychiatric hospital located in Philadelphia, Pennsylvania, United States.

Founded in 1813 by Quakers as The Asylum for the Relief of Persons Deprived of the Use of Their Reason, the institution was later renamed the Frankford Asylum for the Insane. It was the first private mental hospital in the United States, and is the oldest such institution with a continuous history of operation. Its campus, which dates to its founding, is a National Historic Landmark.

Friends Hospital is accredited by the Joint Commission on Accreditation of Healthcare Organizations and licensed by the Commonwealth of Pennsylvania.

== Mission ==
The 1813 mission statement of the hospital was "To provide for the suitable accommodation of persons who are or may be deprived of the use of their reason, and the maintenance of an asylum for their reception, which is intended to furnish, besides requisite medical aid, such tender, sympathetic attention as may soothe their agitated minds, and under the Divine Blessing, facilitate their recovery."

== History ==
The Quakers established Friends Hospital in 1813, drawing on a belief that all persons could live a "moral, ordered existence if treated with kindness, dignity, and respect", despite disabilities. The influential minister Thomas Scattergood decried what he considered the harsh conditions faced by patients in mental asylums, calling for the "moral treatment" of patients. This model served as an inspiration for the establishment of the Friends Asylum for Persons Deprived of the Use of Their Reason; it was the United States' first privately run psychiatric hospital.

== Greystone Program ==
Located on the grounds of the Friends Hospital, the Greystone Program occupies two houses, Greystone House and Hillside House, and is a long-term community residence for individuals with severe and persistent mental illnesses. Some residents chose to make the Greystone Program their permanent home while others transition to a less structured environment.

== See also ==
- List of sites of interest in Philadelphia
