= Tulpehocken Station Historic District =

Historic district in Pennsylvania, United States

- U.S. National Register of Historic Places
- U.S. Historic district
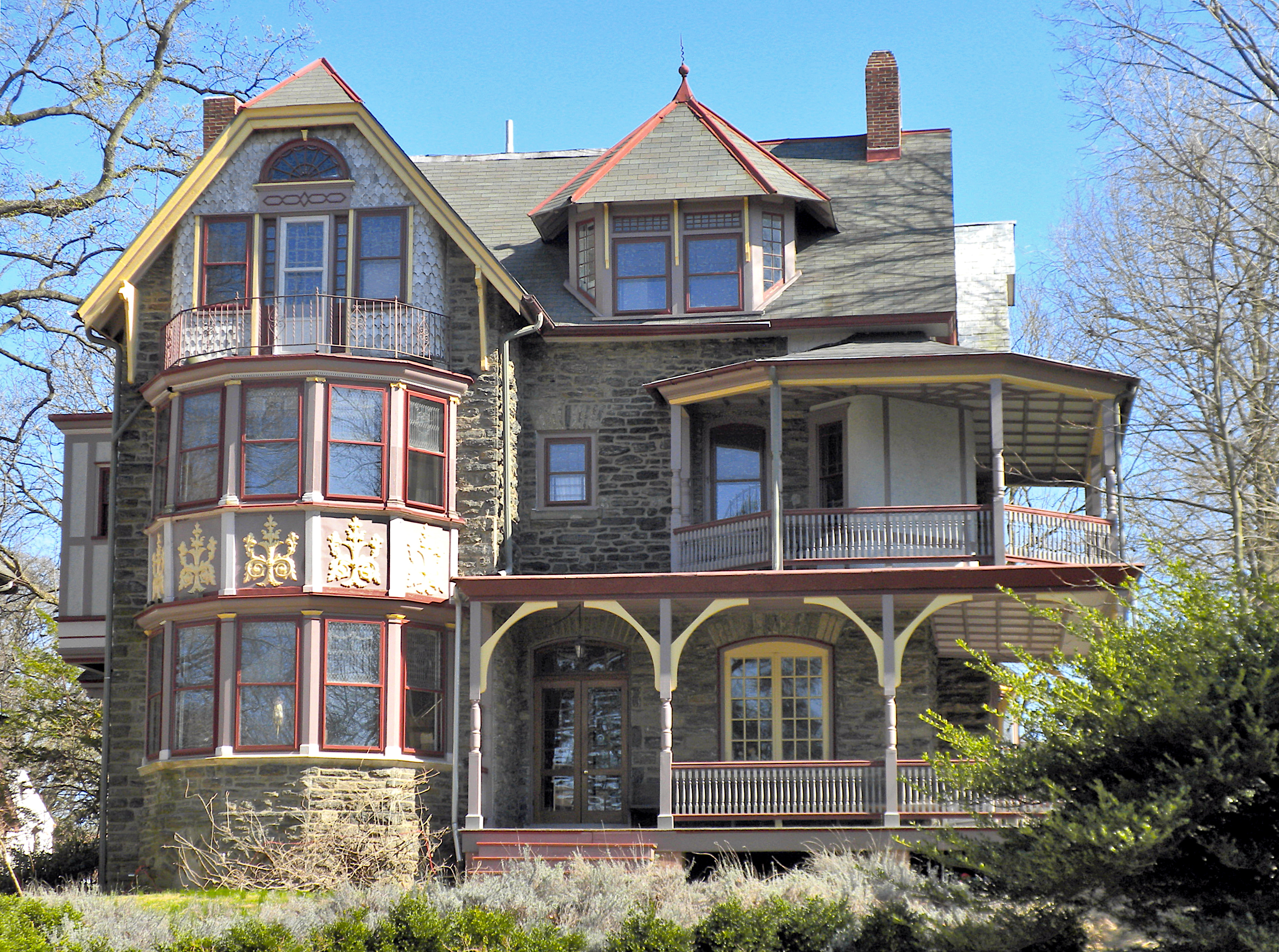

- Location within Philadelphia Location within Pennsylvania Location within the United States
- Location: Roughly bounded by McCallum St., W. Walnut Ln., Penn Central RR tracks, and W. Tulpehocken St., Philadelphia, Pennsylvania
- Coordinates: 40°2′21″N 75°11′1″W
- Area: 80 acres (32 ha)
- Architect: Multiple
- Architectural style: Late 19th and 20th Century Revivals, Late Victorian
- NRHP reference No.: 85003564
- Added to NRHP: November 26, 1985

The Tulpehocken Station Historic District is a historic area in the Germantown neighborhood of Philadelphia, Pennsylvania. Large suburban houses were built in the area from about 1850 to 1900 in a variety of styles including Carpenter Gothic, Italianate, and Bracketed as part of the Picturesque Movement of architecture. In the 1870s styles moved toward High Victorian and Second Empire. The district was added to the National Register of Historic Places in 1985, and it covers about six square blocks, bounded by McCallum Street on the north, the Pennsylvania Railroad tracks on the south, Tulpehocken Street on the west, and Walnut Lane on the east. Thirty-seven buildings in the district are considered to be significant and 118 are considered to be contributing, with only 13 considered to be intrusions.

== Contributing properties ==
Among the 80-acre (320,000 m^{2}) district's 155 contributing properties are:

- Comawaben, a.k.a. Charles Currie House, 50 West Walnut Lane, built 1899 (Mantle Fielding, architect)
- Conyers Button House, 143 W. Walnut Lane, c. 1875
- Kimball House, 144 West Walnut Lane, built 1860
- Lister Townsend House, 6015 Wayne Ave., built 1887
- Ebenezer Maxwell House, 200 W. Tulpehocken St., built 1859
- Mitchell House, 200 W. Walnut Lane, built c. 1856
- Morris House, 131 W. Walnut Lane, c. 1853
- George T. Pearson Residence, 125 West Walnut Lane, 1852–54, altered 1893
- Reformed Episcopal Church of the Atonement, 6100 Greene St., built 1929
- St. Peter's Episcopal Church of Germantown, 6000 Wayne Ave., built 1873
- Tulpehocken Station, 314 West Tulpehocken St., built 1878
- Van Dyke Residence, 150 West Walnut Lane, built c. 1860
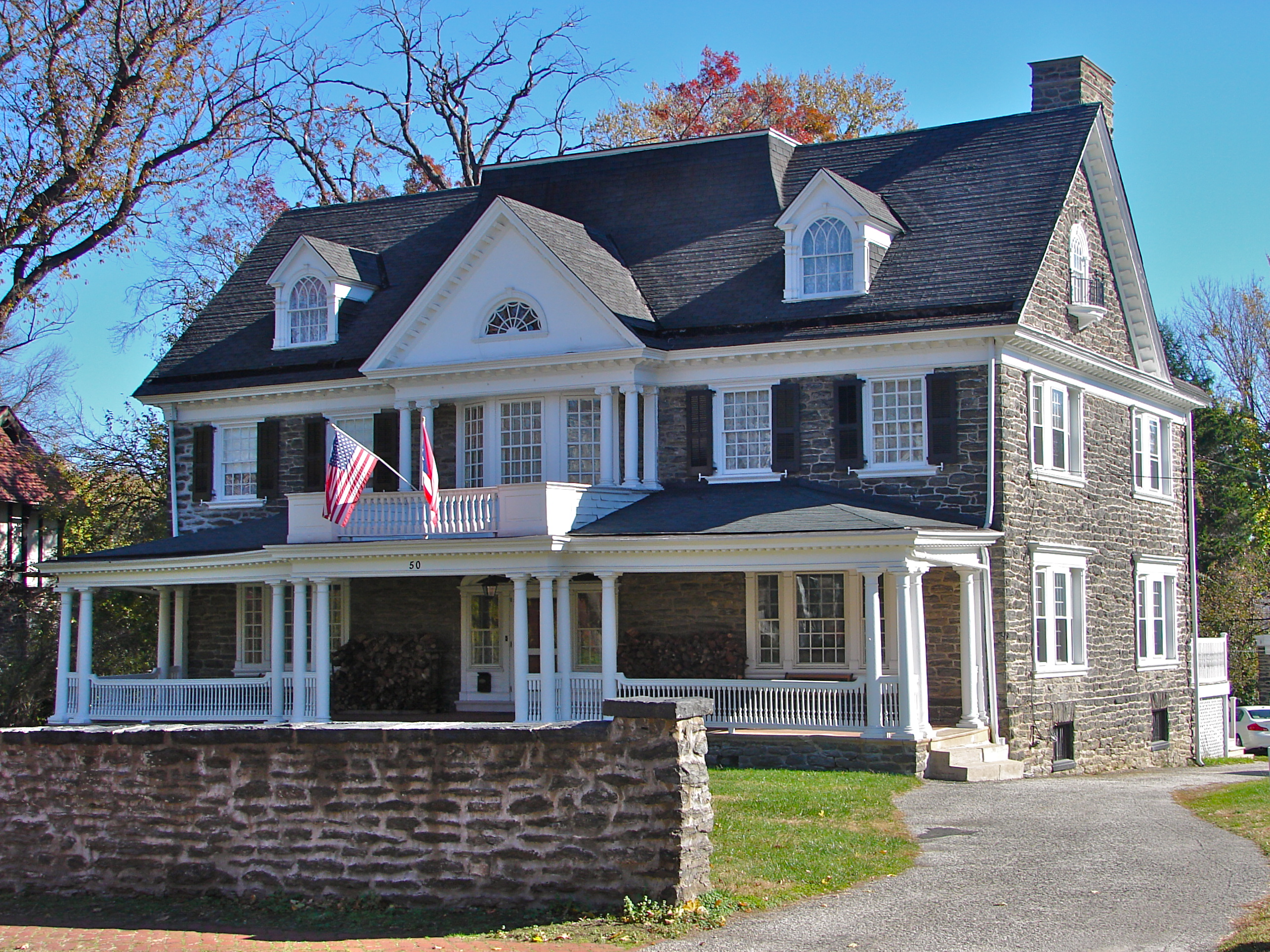
Comawaben, 50 West Walnut Lane

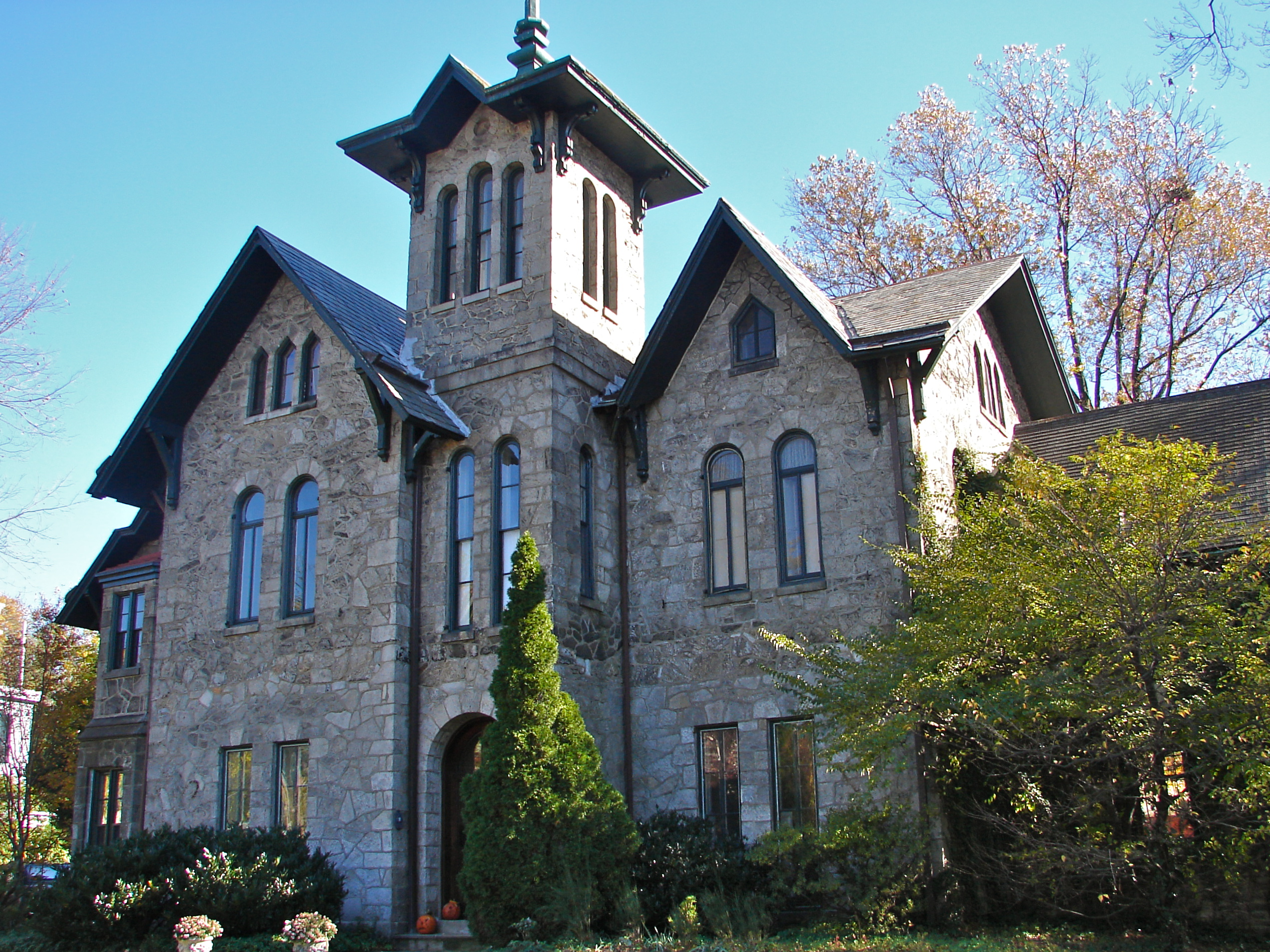
Van Dyke Residence, 150 West Walnut Lane

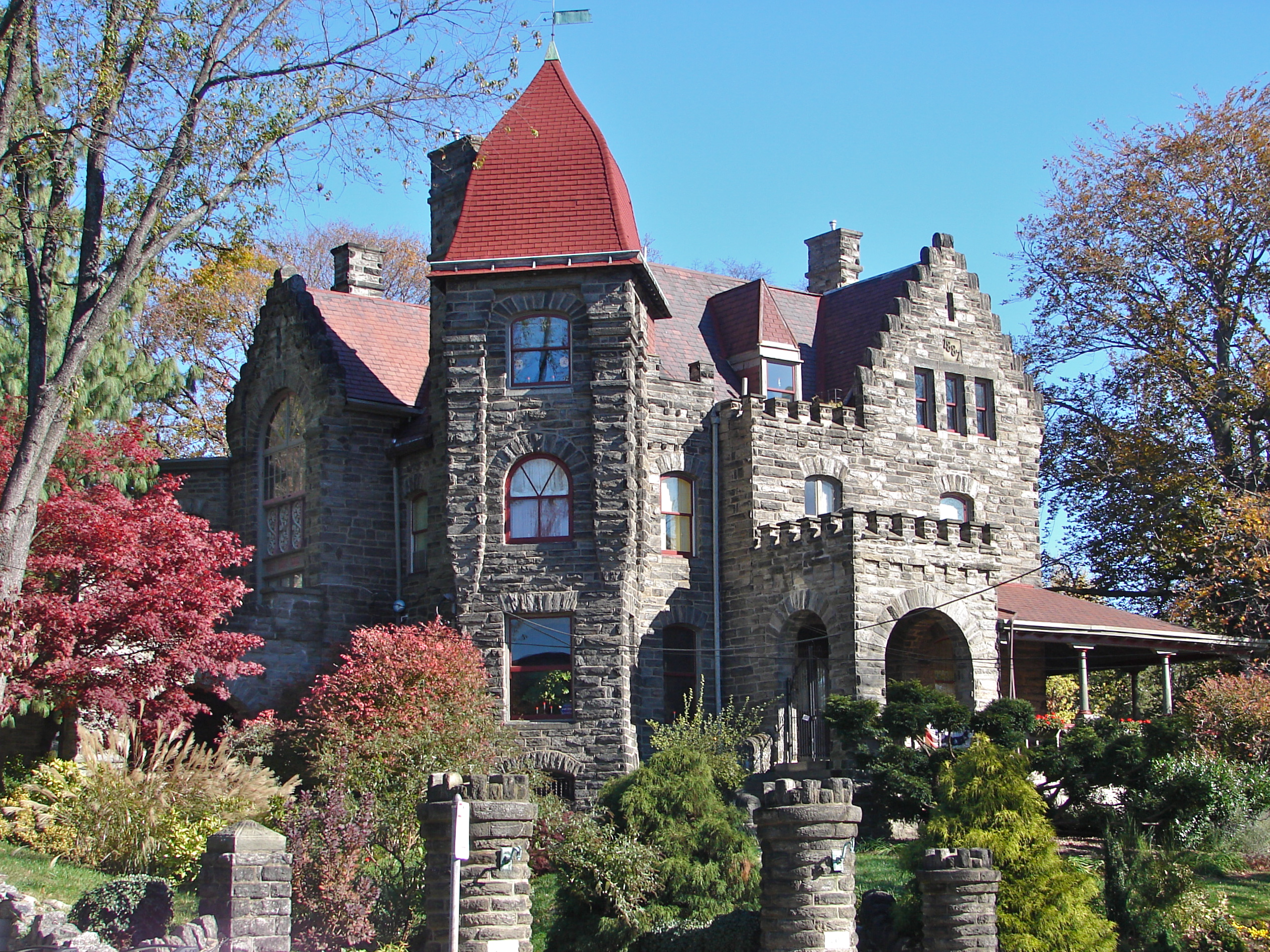
Lister Townsend House, 6015 Wayne Avenue

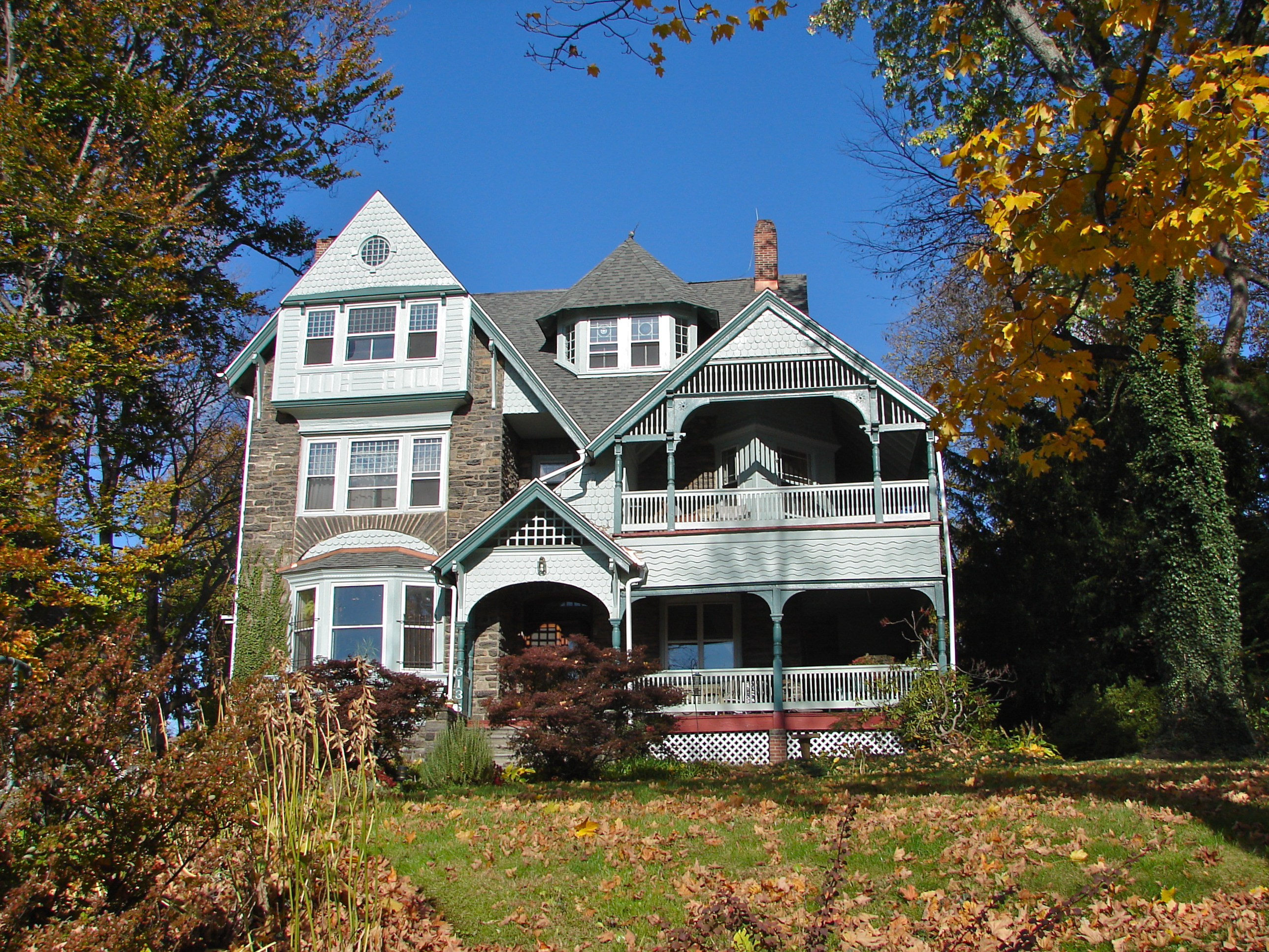
6135 Wayne Avenue

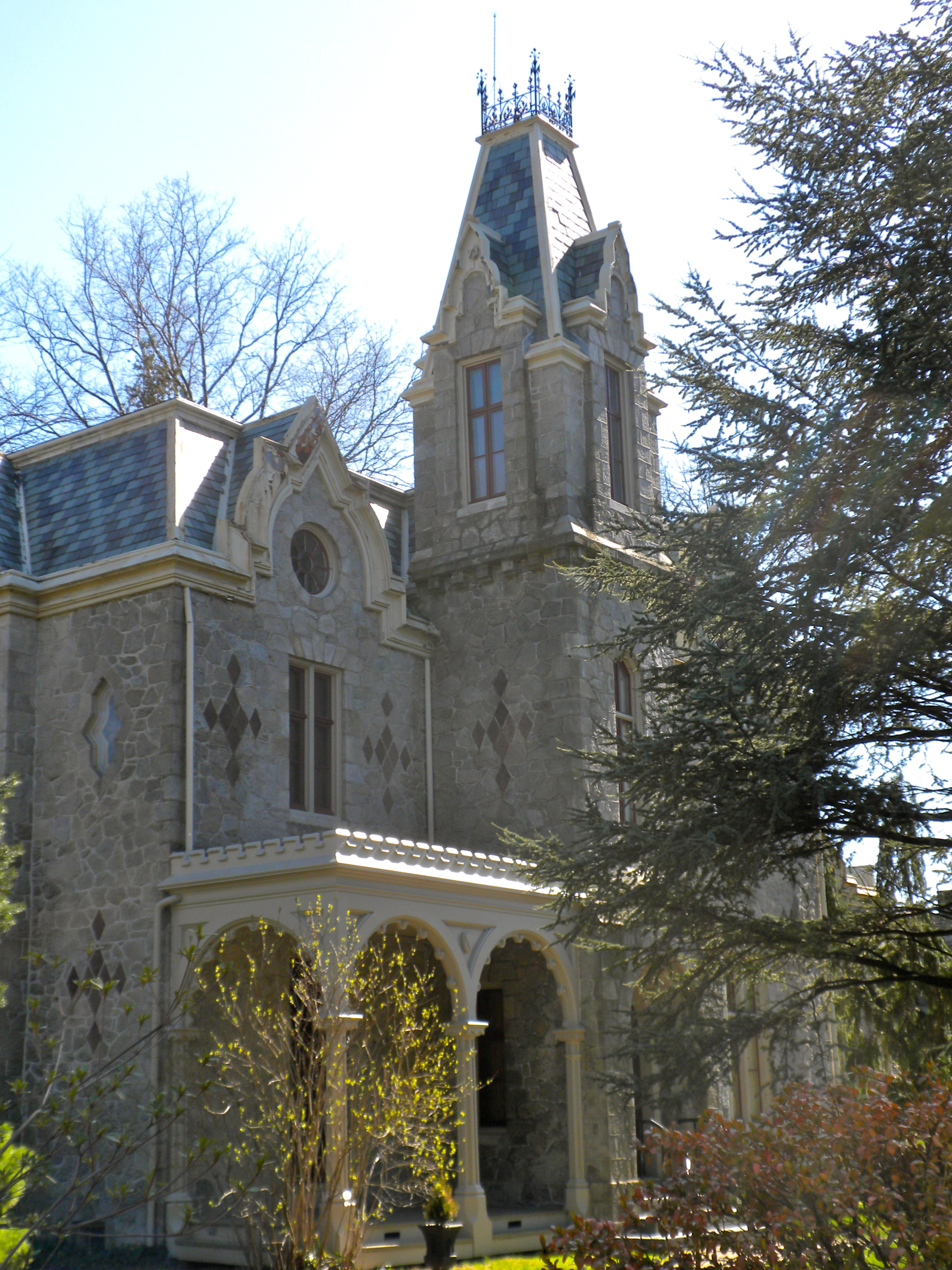
Maxwell House, 200 W. Tulpehocken

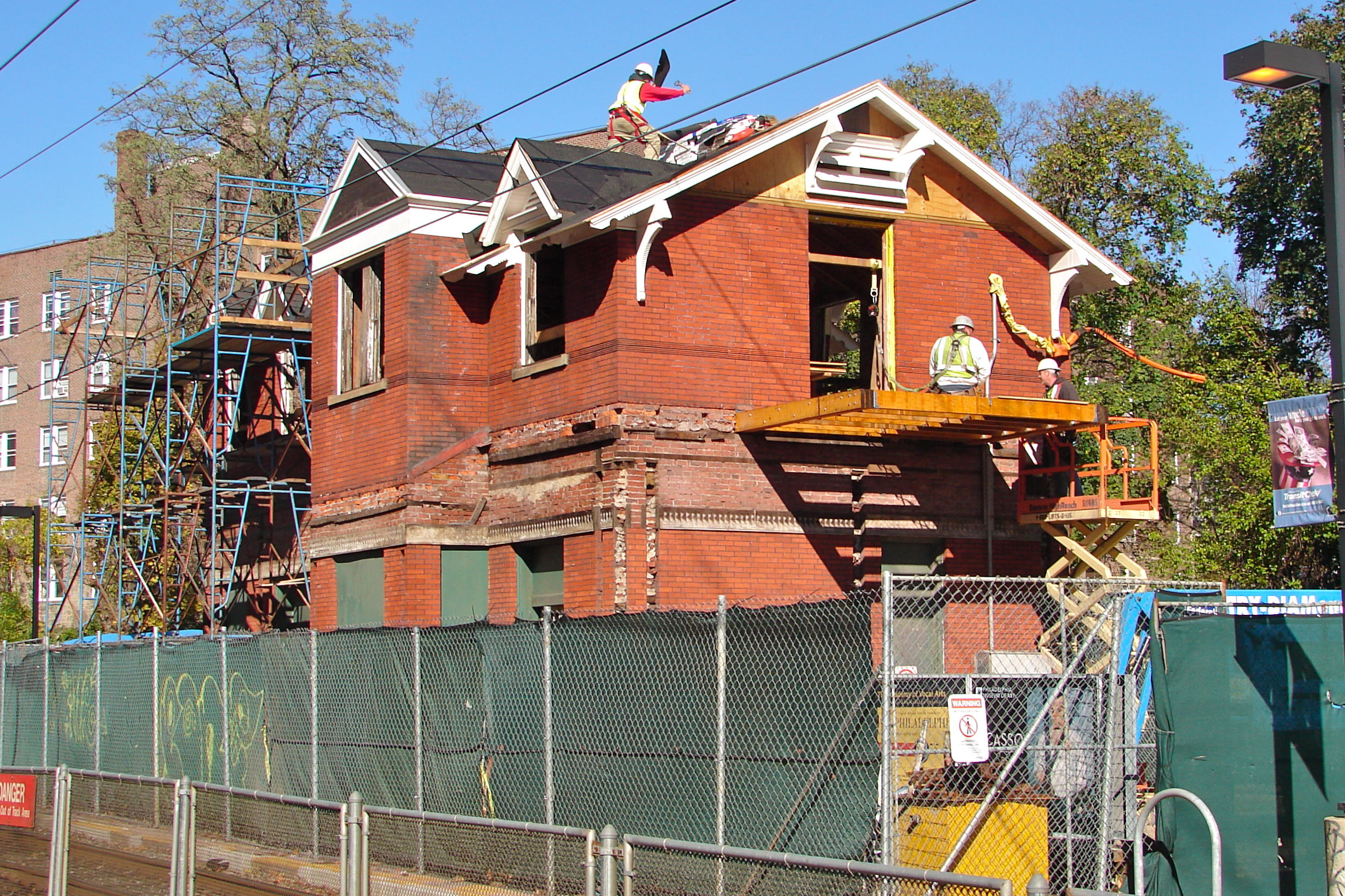
Tulpehocken Station

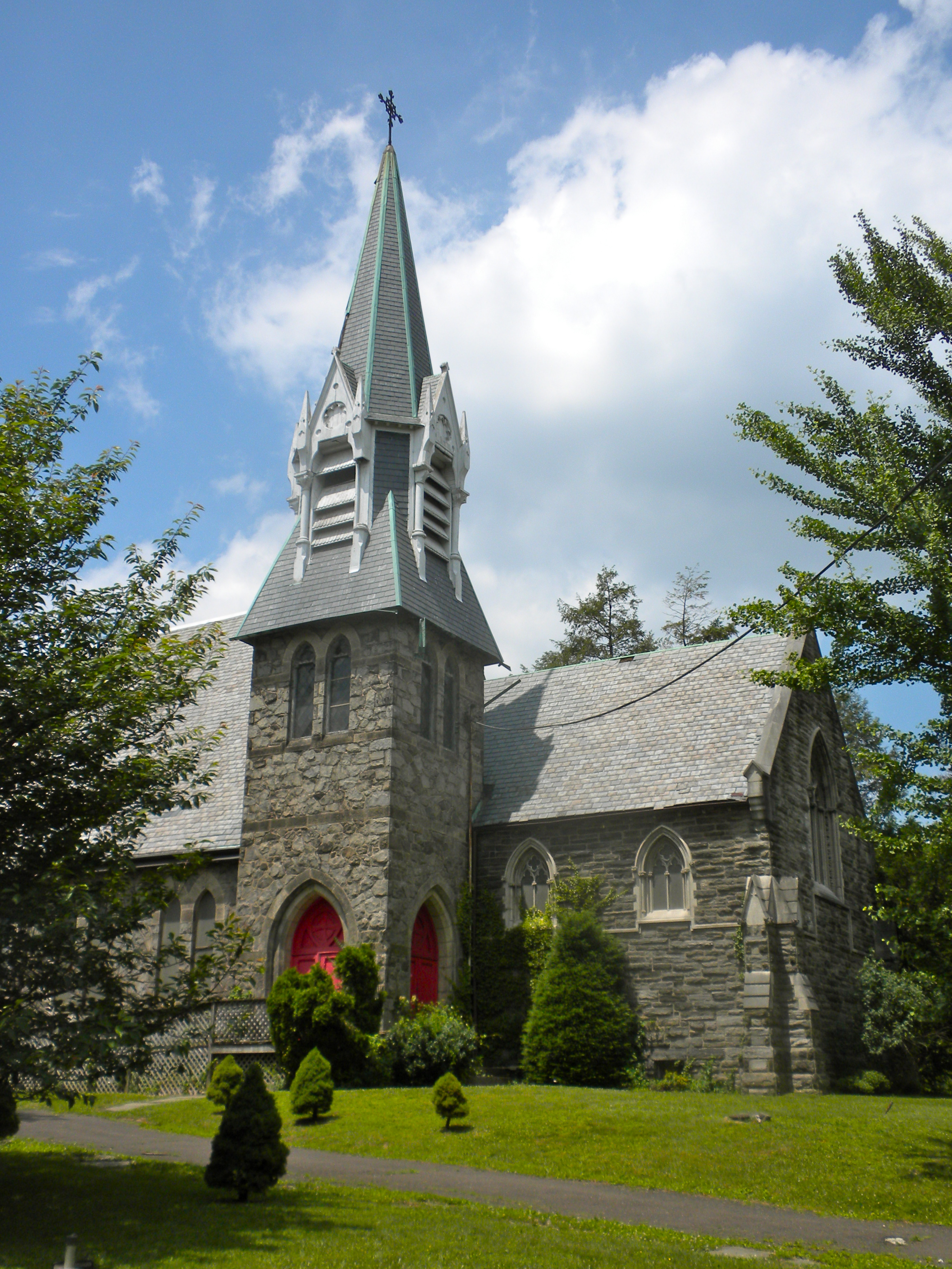
St. Peter's Episcopal Church of Germantown

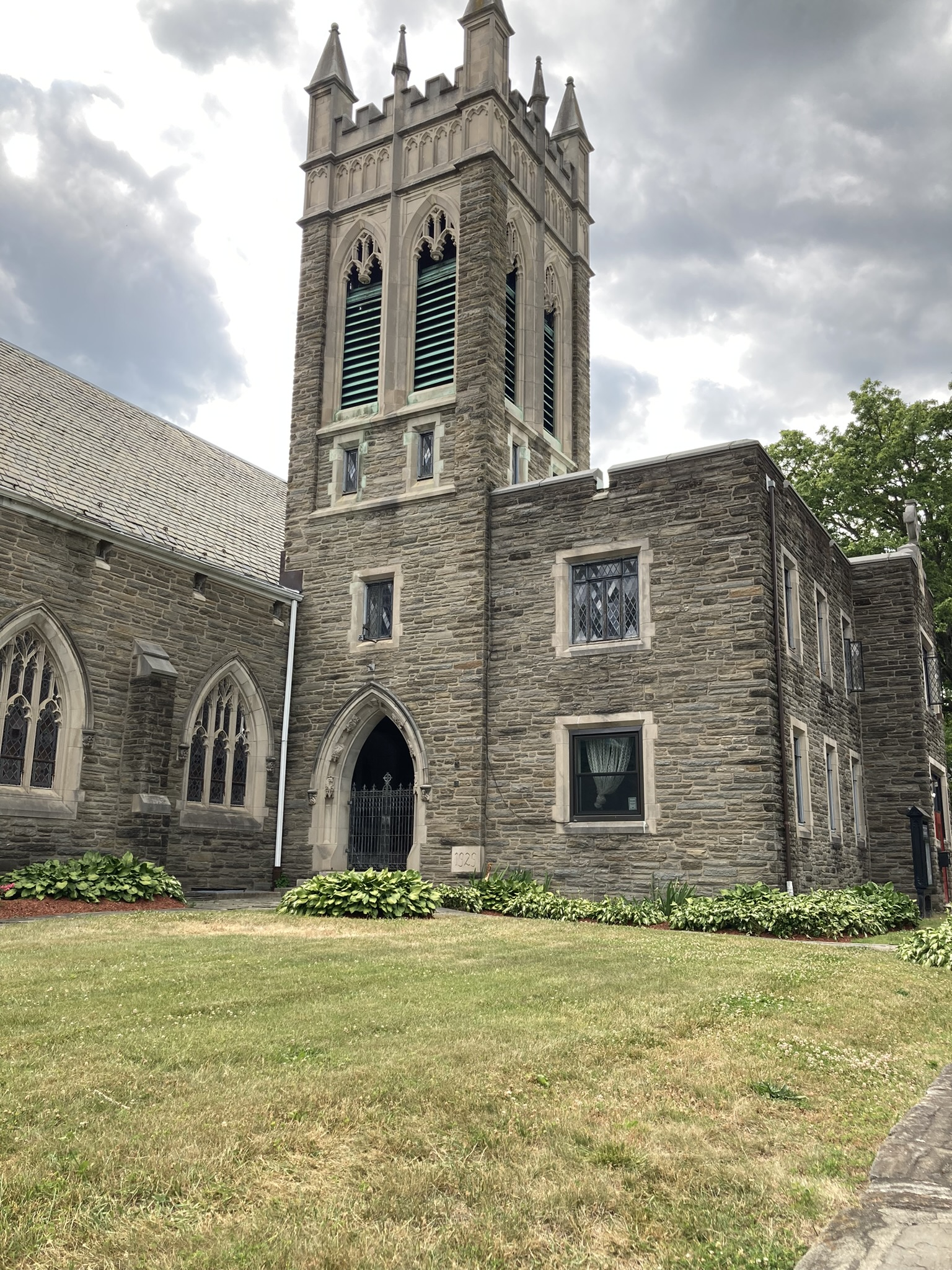
Church of the Atonement

== See also ==
- Awbury Historic District
- Chestnut Hill Historic District
- Colonial Germantown Historic District
- Rittenhousetown Historic District
