= Joseph Mitchell House (Philadelphia) =

Historic house in Pennsylvania, United States

- U.S. Historic district – Contributing property
- Location: Philadelphia, Pennsylvania, U.S.
- Built: 1856
- Architect: Attributed to Samuel Sloan
- Architectural style: Gothic
- Part of: Tulpehocken Station Historic District (ID85003564)
- Added to NRHP: 1985

The Joseph Mitchell House is a Gothic, single-family home in Philadelphia, Pennsylvania. It is part of the Tulpehocken Station Historic District. Samuel Sloan allegedly designed this example of a Gothic villa, a style Andrew Jackson Downing popularized. The exterior has a crenellated tower, a slate roof, gingerbread trim and Queen Anne mullioned windows, and the facade is made from Wissahickon schist.

The house sold in 2014 for $525,000.
