= Ebenezer Maxwell House =

Historic house in Pennsylvania, United States

- U.S. National Register of Historic Places
- U.S. Historic district – Contributing property
- Pennsylvania state historical marker
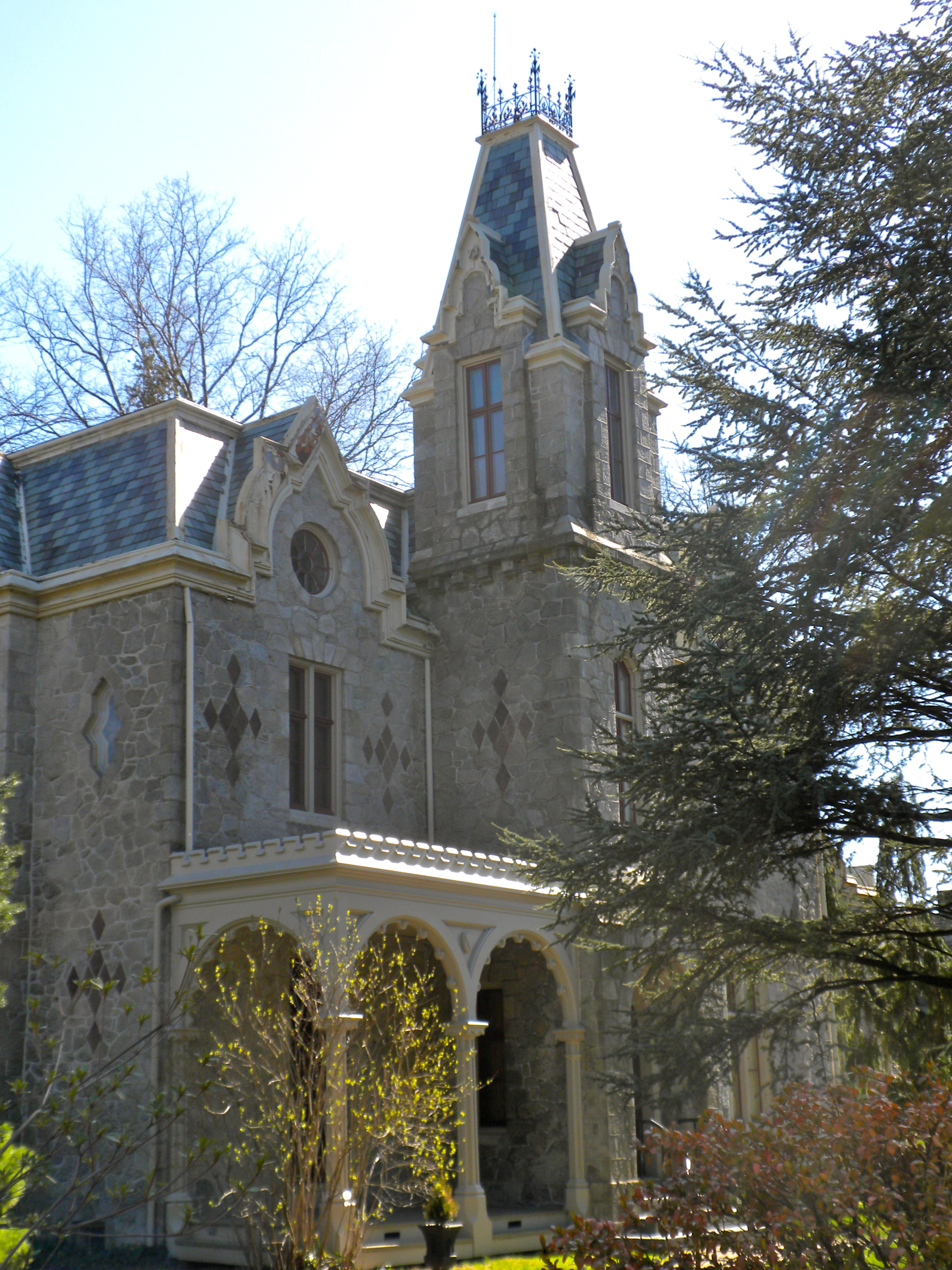

- Location within Philadelphia Location within Pennsylvania Location within the United States
- Location: 200 W. Tulpehocken St., Philadelphia, Pennsylvania
- Coordinates: 40°2′17″N 75°11′2″W
- Area: less than one acre
- Built: 1859
- Architectural style: Victorian Eclectic
- NRHP reference No.: 71000728

Significant dates
- Added to NRHP: February 24, 1971
- Designated PHMC: September 27, 2008

The Ebenezer Maxwell House, operated today as the Ebenezer Maxwell Mansion, is a historic house in the West Germantown neighborhood of Philadelphia, Pennsylvania.

== History and Architectural Features ==
The house was built for $10,000 in 1859 by Ebenezer Maxwell (1827–1870), a wealthy cloth merchant. It featured all of the latest in modern innovations of the time: hot and cold running water in the kitchen, gas lighting throughout, and a gravity hot air system. Three generations of families lived here from 1859 - 1956, the Maxwells, the Hunter family, and the Hunter-Stevenson family.

The masonry building is two-and-a-half stories, with a three-story tower. The main roof is mansard, with slate covering. The house features three porches and four stone chimneys. The original architecture has been attributed variously Joseph C. Hoxie (1814–1870) and/or Samuel Sloan.

== Restoration ==
Saved from destruction, in 1965 the house was restored by the Germantown Historical Society. In 1970, a porch was removed, and in 1979–1980, a cast-iron sidewalk was moved from 1907 N. 7th St. and installed in the rear porch of the house.

== Interior ==
The first floor is interpreted to 1860 when the Maxwell family resided there, and the second floor to 1880 after the Centennial Exposition was held in Philadelphia in 1876.

The parlor features ornate Rococo revival and Renaissance revival machine made wood furniture, gas chandelier, and wall sconces, floor to ceiling patterned wall paper, full window draperies, and patterned carpeting. Accented with gilt mirrors and oil paintings.

== Nominations ==
The house was listed on the National Register of Historic Places February 24, 1971. It was a contributing property to the Tulpehocken Station Historic District established on November 26, 1985 and "stands as a significant example of suburban residential development, the first in Philadelphia and possibly in the country."

== Today's Museum ==
The house has been renovated to its Victorian-era appearance. It is operated, along with its gardens, as a house museum.

The site has an active tour and event program. In 2013, a Public Program and Education Award was given to the Mansion by the Historical Society of Pennsylvania for its “Upstairs Downstairs” docent-led tour that features the stories about the Victorian society and servant women.

== Gallery ==
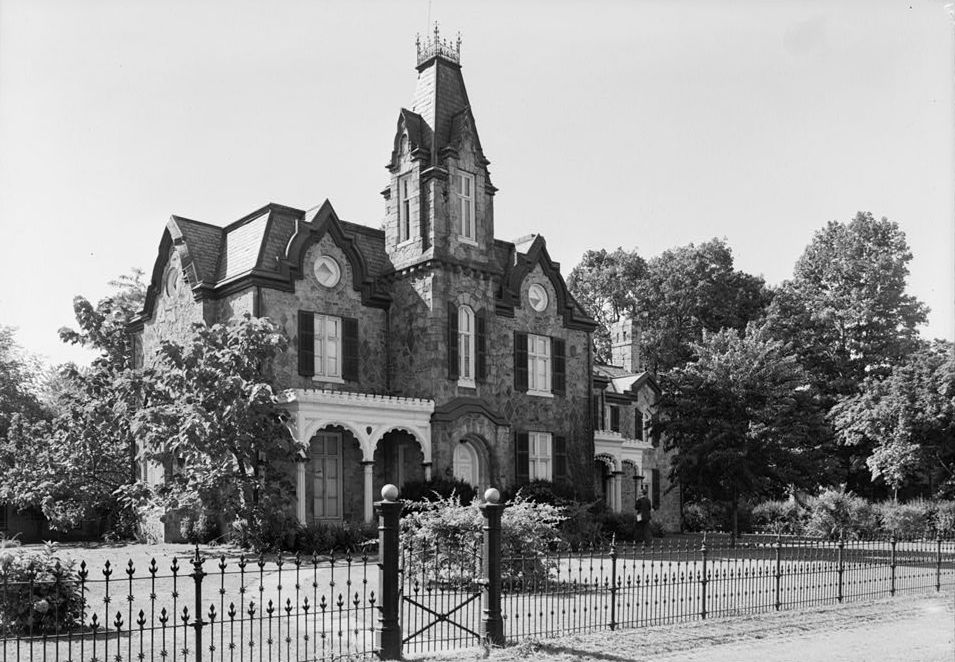
Ebenezer Maxwell House, 1964

== See also ==
- Wyck House
- John Johnson House

Three generation family (Epperson) resided in the house until October 31, 1964
