= McGillin's Olde Ale House =

Historic pub in Philadelphia, Pennsylvania, U.S.

Coordinates: 39.95022°N 75.16258°W

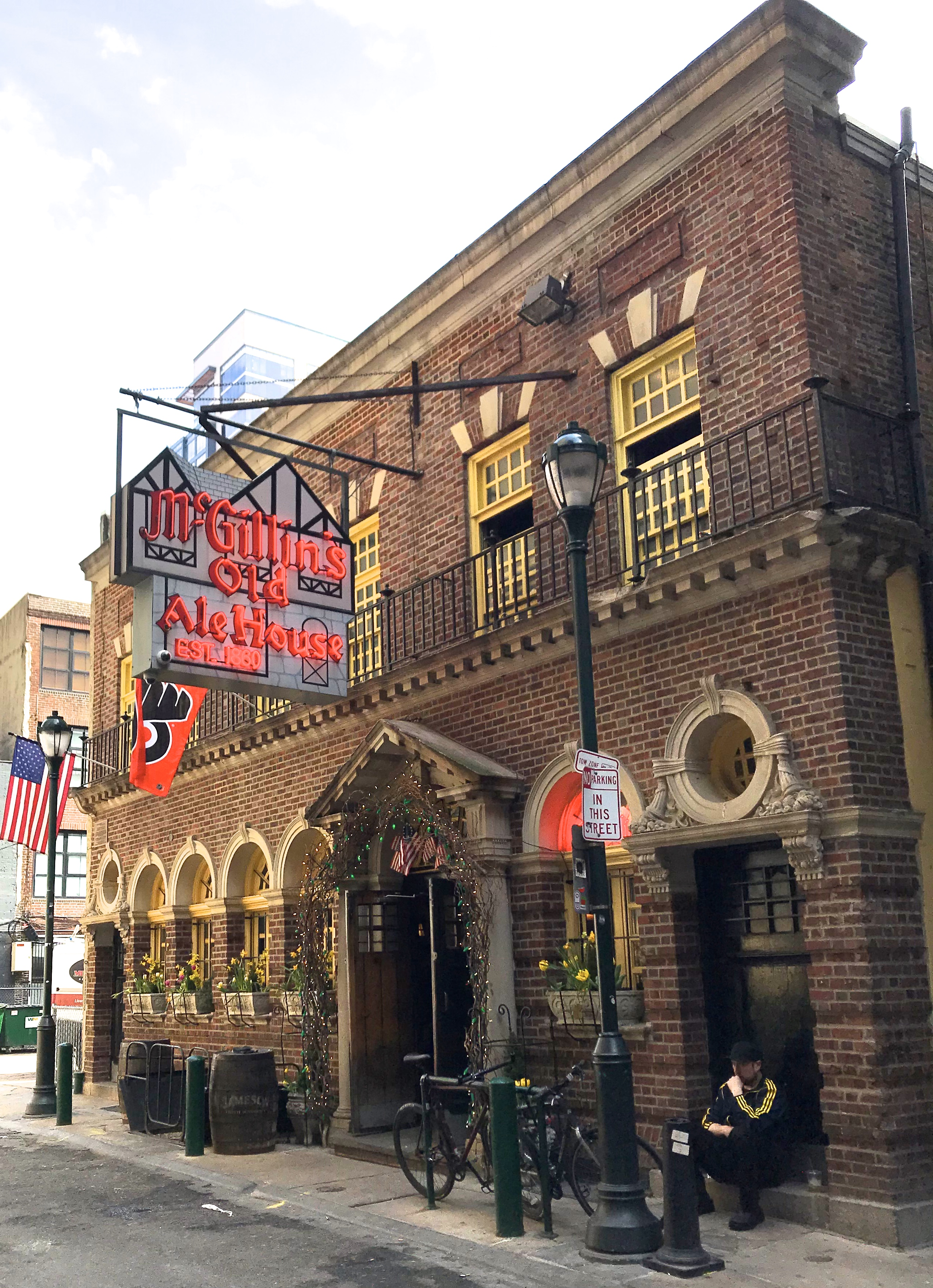
- McGillin's Olde Ale House in April 2018
- Type: Small business
- Industry: Restaurant
- Founded: 1860
- Headquarters: 1310 Drury Street, Philadelphia, Pennsylvania, U.S.
- Key people: Christopher and Mary Ellen Spaniak Mullins, owners; Christopher Mullins, Jr., general manager
- Products: Food and beverage to be consumed on the premises
- Number of employees: approx 25-50 (worldwide)
- Website: mcgillins.com

McGillin's Olde Ale House is a tavern in Center City Philadelphia, Pennsylvania. McGillin's is the oldest continuously operating bar in Philadelphia and one of the oldest in the United States. It opened in 1860 - the year Lincoln was elected president. It is located on Drury Street, an alley connecting 13th Street and South Juniper Street, between Chestnut and Sansom streets, in Center City.

== History ==
=== 19th century ===
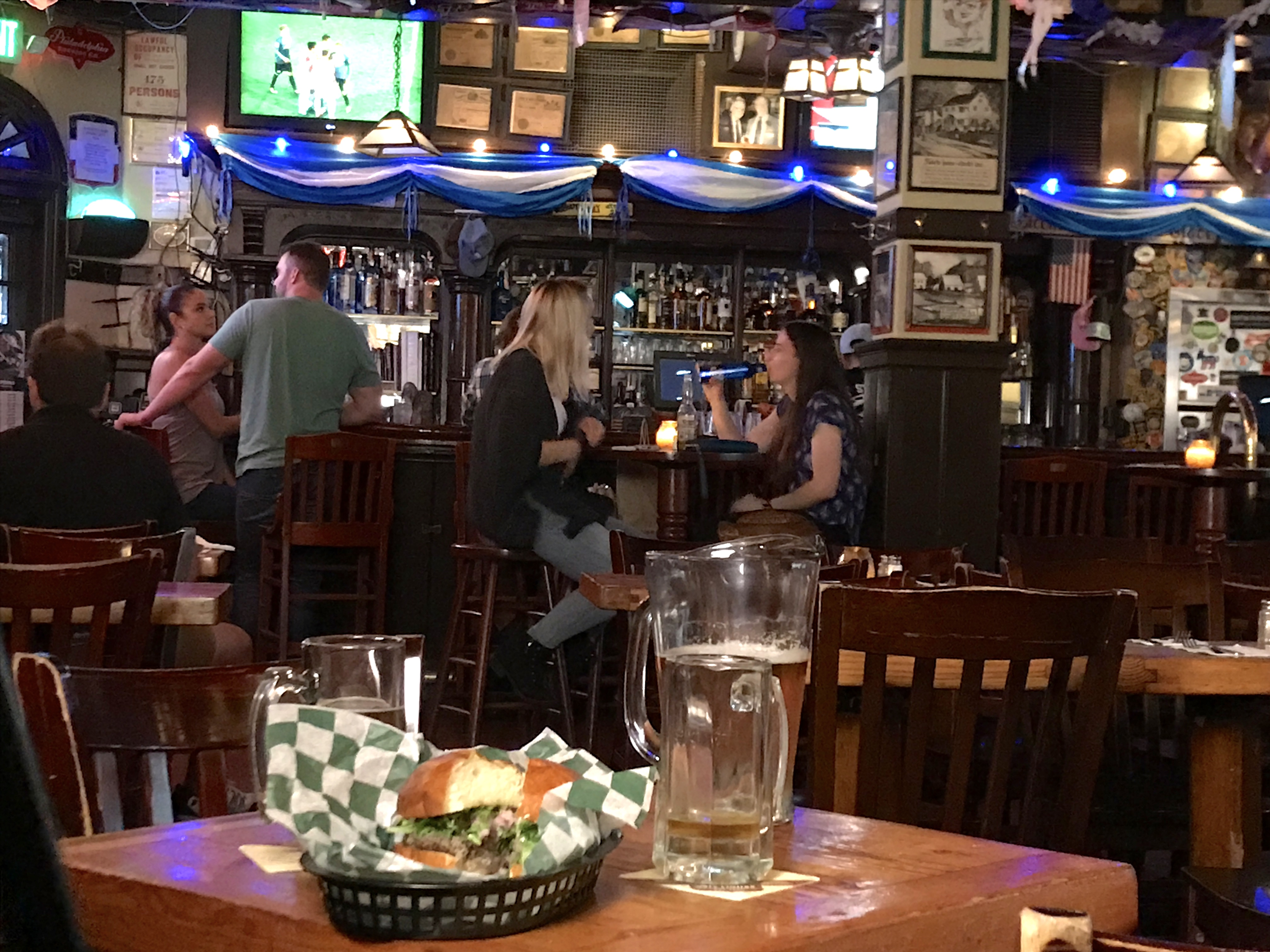
The interior of McGillin's Olde Ale House in September 2017

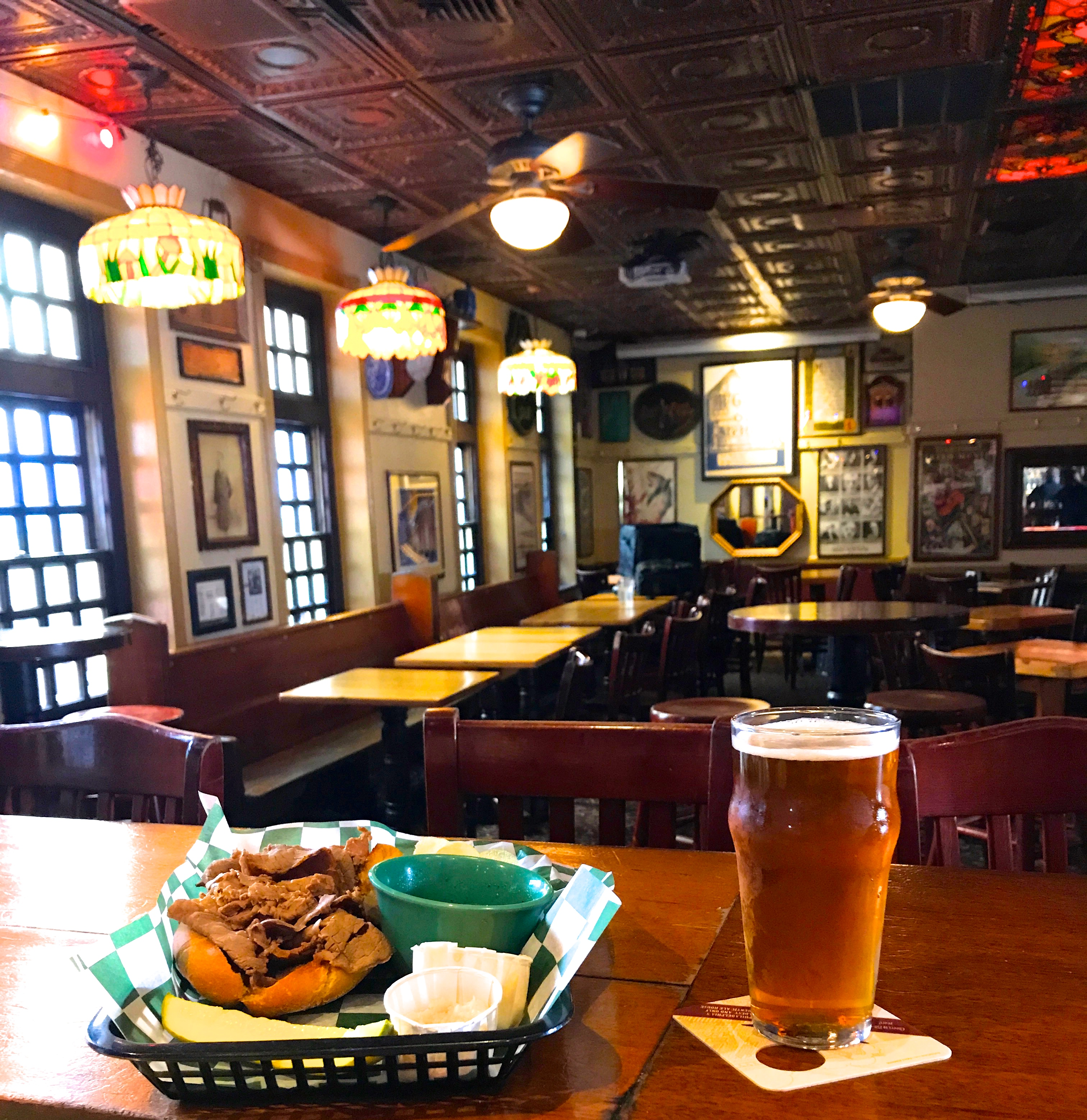
Food and beer at McGillin's Olde Ale House in May 2017

Initially called The Bell in Hand, the famous pub opened its doors in 1860 in the home of Irish immigrant William "Pa" McGillin, the owner and operator of the establishment. It was nicknamed McGillin's by those who frequented the establishment, and the bar took on the title as its official name.

=== 20th century ===
"Pa" McGillin operated the establishment until his death in 1901. Then his wife Catherine, known as "Ma" McGillin continued running the business, which had grown to encompass the oyster house next door as well as the remainder of the McGillin's house, displacing her 13 children. "Ma" ran the restaurant until her own death in 1937, at age 90.

After Ma's death, the tavern was run by her daughter, Mercedes McGillin Hooper, until 1958, when she sold it to Henry Spaniak and Joe Shepaniak, brothers and experienced bartenders, who used different spellings of their last names.

Since 1993, the bar has been owned by Henry's daughter, Mary Ellen Spaniak Mullins, and her husband Chris Mullins. Their son, Christopher Mullins, Jr., also helps run the day-to-day operations.

The ceramic tile floor of the main floor, though not original to the bar, was installed by "Pa" McGillin because he was "tired of replacing the wooden floors because of wear and tear from workers' boots. William got the idea from a local butcher shop—little wear and tear, easy to clean."

There is a ship bell and a cow bell behind the bar which the bartenders ring when they get a great tip. They also ring it to "gong" or "boo" a bad karaoke singer. During a Philadelphia Phillies, Philadelphia Eagles, Philadelphia 76ers, Philadelphia Union, or Philadelphia Flyers game, it can be expected that the bell will be rung when the home team scores.

=== 21st century ===
In 2002, the political website PoliticsPA named it to their list of restaurants frequented by politicians.

In 2007, the national trade magazine Nightclub and Bar included McGillin's in its Editors' Choice Top 100 bars and clubs in the United States. The list is based on annual revenue, effective marketing and advertising, uniqueness to market and other factors. Many media outlets have called McGillin's one of America's most authentic Irish pubs in the nation, including USA Today, HuffPost, Fodor's, The Daily Meal, MSN, and Orbitz.

In 2013, Gourmet magazine called McGillin's one of the three coolest bars in the United States.

McGillin's Olde Ale House has also become known for its elaborate Christmas decorations during the holiday season.

In 2005, the bar opened a permanent, year-round Shoppe located around the corner at 123 S. Juniper Street. The Shoppe is filled with unique Philly souvenirs and gifts, Irish imports, McGillin's, Eagles and Phillies wear.

Also in 2025, Cheers to McGillin's: Philly's Oldest Tavern" was published by Camino Press. The book tells the bar's colorful 166-year history including how McGillin's survived the Civil War, two World Wars, two pandemics and even Prohibition. Tales of the two families who have owned the bar and passed it down through generations, heartfelt love stories, eerie ghost stories, tales of long-time employees and beloved guests, historical photos, recipes for signature dishes and cocktails. Written by Irene Levy Baker and published by Camino Books. Foreword by Edward G. Rendell, former Pennsylvania Governor & Philadelphia Mayor.

== Notable paraphernalia ==
McGillin's has become the home to a sizable collection of historical Philadelphia paraphernalia, including:

- A catalogue of every Liquor License held by the pub since 1871, saved by William McGillin and each successive owner
- The original "Bell in Hand" sign that William "Pa" McGillin designed for the pub when it opened in 1860. The sign is a carved piece of wood of an arm ringing a bell.
- The John Wanamaker's "signature" logo sign from the original Wanamaker's Department Store at 13th and Market Streets.
- The Strawbridge & Clothier "Seal of Quality" logo sign from the Market Street Store - Presented to McGillin's by Peter Strawbridge, the founder's great-grandson.
- Lit Brothers Department Store tiled subway sign
- F.W. Woolworth's tiled subway sign indicating the defunct Market Street store
- A Corestates Financial Group sign
- A Le Bec Fin sign

== See also ==
- King George II Inn
- History of the Irish Americans in Philadelphia
- List of sites of interest in Philadelphia
- List of the oldest restaurants in the United States
- Market East, Philadelphia
