= National Register of Historic Places listings in Northwest Philadelphia =

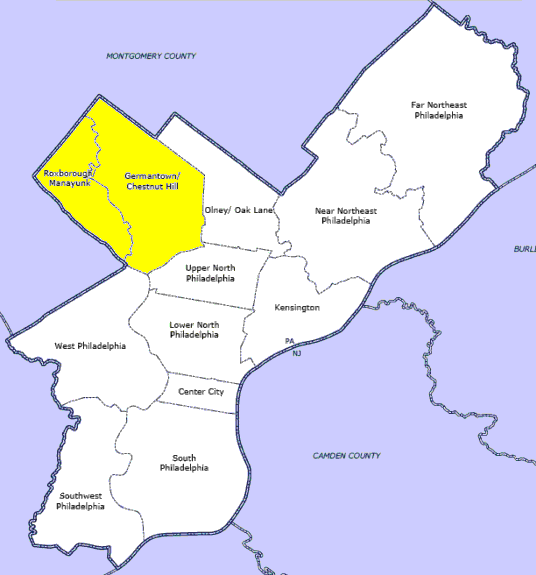
Location of Northwest Philadelphia in Philadelphia

This is a list of the National Register of Historic Places listings in Northwest Philadelphia.

This is intended to be a complete list of the properties and districts on the National Register of Historic Places in Northwest Philadelphia, Pennsylvania, United States. The locations of National Register properties and districts for which the latitude and longitude coordinates are included below, may be seen in an online map.

There are more than 600 properties and districts listed on the National Register in Philadelphia, including 67 National Historic Landmarks. Northwest Philadelphia includes 80 of these properties and districts, including 6 National Historic Landmarks; the city's remaining properties and districts are listed elsewhere. One site is split between Northwest Philadelphia and other parts of the city, and is thus included on multiple lists.

== Current listings ==
	Name on the Register	Image	Date listed	Location	Neighborhood	Description
1	Alden Park Manor	Alden Park Manor	August 15, 1980 (#80003606)	School House Lane and Wissahickon Avenue; 40°01′34″N 75°11′10″W	Germantown	
2	Anglecot	Anglecot	April 19, 1982 (#82003806)	Prospect Street and Evergreen Avenue; 40°04′51″N 75°12′14″W	Chestnut Hill	
3	Awbury Historic District	Awbury Historic District	May 2, 2001 (#01000462)	Roughly bounded by Chew Avenue, Avonhoe Road, Devon Place, Haines and Ardleigh Streets, and the Arboretum boundary. 40°03′06″N 75°10′14″W	East Germantown	
4	Beggarstown School	Beggarstown School	November 23, 1971 (#71000718)	6669 Germantown Avenue; 40°03′05″N 75°11′06″W	Mount Airy	
5	Bellevue Worsted Mills	Bellevue Worsted Mills	September 10, 2021 (#100006880)	5127 Belfield Avenue; 40°02′13″N 75°09′35″W	Wister	
6	Daniel Billmeyer House	Daniel Billmeyer House	December 13, 1971 (#71000719)	6504 Germantown Avenue; 40°02′55″N 75°11′03″W	Mount Airy	
7	Michael Billmeyer House	Michael Billmeyer House	January 13, 1972 (#72001145)	6505–6507 Germantown Avenue; 40°02′54″N 75°11′02″W	Mount Airy	
8	Chestnut Hill Historic District	Chestnut Hill Historic District	June 20, 1985 (#85001334)	Roughly bounded by Fairmount Park and the Montgomery County line 40°04′18″N 75°12′47″W	Chestnut Hill	
9	Clarkson-Watson House	Clarkson-Watson House	April 2, 1973 (#73001661)	5275–5277 Germantown Avenue; 40°01′56″N 75°10′08″W	Wister	
10	Cliveden	Cliveden	October 15, 1966 (#66000677)	6401 Germantown Avenue; 40°02′50″N 75°10′54″W	Mount Airy	
11	Colonial Germantown Historic District	Colonial Germantown Historic District	October 15, 1966 (#66000678)	Germantown Avenue between Windrim Avenue and Upsal Street; also the 6500–7600 blocks of Germantown Avenue from the Fort Washington branch of the Pennsylvania Railroad to Sharpnack Street; 40°02′11″N 75°10′29″W	Germantown and Mount Airy	
12	Compton and Bloomfield	Compton and Bloomfield	December 22, 1978 (#78002445)	9414 Meadowbrook Avenue; 40°05′21″N 75°13′29″W	Chestnut Hill	Extends into Montgomery County
13	Conyngham-Hacker House	Conyngham-Hacker House	January 13, 1972 (#72001149)	5214 Germantown Avenue; 40°01′52″N 75°10′04″W	Germantown	
14	Delmar Apartments	Delmar Apartments	November 14, 1982 (#82001545)	319 West Chelten Avenue; 40°01′47″N 75°10′54″W	Germantown	
15	Deshler-Morris House	Deshler-Morris House	January 13, 1972 (#72000095)	5442 Germantown Avenue; 40°02′01″N 75°10′22″W	Germantown	
16	James Dobson School	James Dobson School	November 18, 1988 (#88002264)	4665 Umbria Street; 40°01′52″N 75°13′50″W	Manayunk	
17	Druim Moir Historic District	Druim Moir Historic District	December 11, 1979 (#79002318)	Bounded by Fairmount Park, Cherokee Street, Hartwell Lane, and Valley Green Drive; 40°03′33″N 75°12′52″W	Chestnut Hill	
18	Eleanor Cope Emlen School of Practice	Eleanor Cope Emlen School of Practice	November 18, 1988 (#88002267)	6501 Chew Street; 40°03′15″N 75°10′42″W	Mount Airy	
19	Margaret Esherick House	Margaret Esherick House	August 21, 2023 (#100009239)	204 Sunrise Ln. 40°04′21″N 75°12′23″W	Chestnut Hill	
20	Fairelawn	Fairelawn	September 5, 2023 (#100009301)	30 Pelham Rd. 40°03′09″N 75°11′14″W	Mount Airy	
21	Fairmount Park	Fairmount Park	February 7, 1972 (#72001151)	Both banks of the Schuylkill River and the Wissahickon Creek from Spring Garden Street to Northwestern Avenue; 40°01′15″N 75°12′46″W	Fairmount Park	Extends into North and West Philadelphia
22	First Baptist Church of Germantown	First Baptist Church of Germantown	August 21, 2023 (#100009240)	40 East Price Street; 40°02′15″N 75°10′29″W	Germantown	
23	Fisher's Lane	Fisher's Lane	February 20, 1980 (#80003611)	East Logan Street; 40°01′46″N 75°09′40″W	Wister	
24	Fitler School	Fitler School	December 4, 1986 (#86003281)	Southeast corner of Seymour and Knox Streets; 40°01′33″N 75°10′00″W	Germantown	
25	Robert Fulton School	Robert Fulton School	December 4, 1986 (#86003284)	64 East Haines Street; 40°02′24″N 75°10′36″W	Morton	
26	Germantown Cricket Club	Germantown Cricket Club	February 27, 1987 (#87000758)	5140 Morris Street; 40°01′25″N 75°10′24″W	Germantown	
27	Germantown Fireproof Storage Warehouse	Germantown Fireproof Storage Warehouse	July 5, 2022 (#100007864)	231-253 Church Ln. 40°02′11″N 75°10′10″W	Germantown	
28	Germantown Grammar School	Germantown Grammar School	December 1, 1986 (#86003287)	McCallum and Haines Streets; 40°02′16″N 75°10′41″W	Germantown	
29	Germantown Jewish Centre	Germantown Jewish Centre	May 27, 2021 (#100006587)	400 West Ellet Street; 40°03′01″N 75°11′40″W	Germantown	
30	Grace Church, Mt. Airy	Grace Church, Mt. Airy	January 15, 1998 (#97001654)	224 East Gowen Avenue; 40°03′57″N 75°11′19″W	Mount Airy	
31	Graver's Lane Station	Graver's Lane Station	November 7, 1977 (#77001184)	Gravers Lane and the Reading Railroad line 40°04′39″N 75°12′07″W	Chestnut Hill	
32	Grumblethorpe	Grumblethorpe	March 16, 1972 (#72001155)	5267 Germantown Avenue; 40°01′56″N 75°10′07″W	Wister	
33	Grumblethorpe Tenant House	Grumblethorpe Tenant House	June 19, 1972 (#72001156)	5269 Germantown Avenue; 40°01′56″N 75°10′07″W	Wister	
34	Happy Hollow Recreation Center	Happy Hollow Recreation Center	April 28, 2014 (#14000184)	4740 Wayne Avenue; 40°01′27″N 75°09′58″W	Germantown	
35	Charles Wolcott Henry School	Charles Wolcott Henry School	November 18, 1988 (#88002279)	623 Carpenter Lane; 40°02′46″N 75°11′47″W	Mount Airy	
36	Robert M. Hogue House	Robert M. Hogue House	January 16, 1986 (#86000165)	100 Pelham Road; 40°03′07″N 75°11′15″W	Mount Airy	
37	Henry H. Houston School	Henry H. Houston School	April 10, 1989 (#88002283)	135 West Allens Lane; 40°03′32″N 75°11′42″W	Mount Airy	
38	Howell House	Howell House	January 13, 1972 (#72001159)	5218 Germantown Avenue; 40°01′53″N 75°10′04″W	Germantown	
39	Ivy Lodge	Ivy Lodge	February 1, 1972 (#72001161)	29 East Penn Street; 40°02′00″N 75°10′07″W	Wister	
40	John Story Jenks School	John Story Jenks School	November 18, 1988 (#88002286)	8301 Germantown Avenue; 40°04′30″N 75°12′12″W	Chestnut Hill	
41	John Johnson House	John Johnson House	January 13, 1972 (#72001162)	6306 Germantown Avenue; 40°02′36″N 75°10′52″W	Germantown	
42	Keystone Mill	Keystone Mill	July 26, 2024 (#100010575)	201 Leverington Avenue; 40°01′52″N 75°13′35″W	Roxborough	
43	William Levering School	William Levering School	November 18, 1988 (#88002292)	5938 Ridge Avenue; 40°01′51″N 75°12′46″W	Roxborough	
44	Malvern Hall	Malvern Hall	August 25, 1983 (#83002273)	6655 McCallum Street; 40°02′46″N 75°11′28″W	Mount Airy	
45	Manayunk Main Street Historic District	Manayunk Main Street Historic District	March 18, 1983 (#83002274)	Roughly bounded by the Reading Railroad, Flat Rock Dam, Schuylkill River, and Lot 4025 on Main Street; 40°02′00″N 75°14′13″W	Manayunk	
46	Ebenezer Maxwell House	Ebenezer Maxwell House	February 24, 1971 (#71000728)	200 West Tulpehocken Street; 40°02′18″N 75°11′01″W	Germantown	
47	Mayfair House	Mayfair House	April 7, 1982 (#82003811)	401 West Johnson Street; 40°02′14″N 75°11′30″W	Germantown	Destroyed. Photo shows empty lot with Connie Mack's house in background.
48	McCallum Manor	McCallum Manor	May 9, 1985 (#85001000)	6653 McCallum Avenue; 40°02′43″N 75°11′29″W	Mount Airy	
49	Thomas Meehan School	Thomas Meehan School	November 18, 1988 (#88002312)	5347–5353 Pulaski Street; 40°01′39″N 75°10′30″W	Germantown	
50	Mennonite Meetinghouse	Mennonite Meetinghouse	July 23, 1973 (#73001663)	6119 Germantown Avenue; 40°02′28″N 75°10′45″W	Morton	
51	Thomas Mifflin School	Thomas Mifflin School	November 18, 1988 (#88002301)	3500 Midvale Avenue; 40°00′49″N 75°11′29″W	East Falls	
52	The Monastery	The Monastery	March 16, 1972 (#72001164)	Kitchen's Lane at Wissahickon Creek; 40°02′10″N 75°12′13″W	Fairmount Park	
53	Mt. Airy Station	Mt. Airy Station	September 22, 1977 (#77001186)	119 East Gowen Avenue; 40°03′55″N 75°11′28″W	Mount Airy	
54	Nugent Home for Baptists	Nugent Home for Baptists	August 30, 2006 (#06000746)	221 West Johnson Street; 40°02′33″N 75°11′11″W	Mount Airy	
55	Violet Oakley Studio	Violet Oakley Studio	September 13, 1977 (#77001188)	627 St. George's Road; 40°03′12″N 75°12′19″W	Mount Airy	
56	Oaks Cloister	Oaks Cloister	April 22, 2019 (#100003636)	5829 Wissahickon Avenue & 3 Lehman Ln. 40°02′00″N 75°10′29″W	Germantown	
57	Old Germantown Academy and Headmasters' Houses	Old Germantown Academy and Headmasters' Houses	January 13, 1972 (#72001168)	Schoolhouse Lane and Greene Street; 40°02′00″N 75°10′29″W	Germantown	
58	Pennsylvania Institute for the Deaf and Dumb	Pennsylvania Institute for the Deaf and Dumb	May 9, 1985 (#85000999)	7500 Germantown Avenue; 40°03′49″N 75°11′47″W	Mount Airy	
59	Presser Home for Retired Music Teachers	Presser Home for Retired Music Teachers	November 8, 2006 (#06001006)	111 W. Johnson St. 40°02′37″N 75°11′06″W	Mount Airy	
60	Ridge Avenue Bridge in Philadelphia	Ridge Avenue Bridge in Philadelphia	June 22, 1988 (#88000852)	Ridge Avenue over the Wissahickon Creek; 40°00′54″N 75°12′24″W	Wissahickon	
61	RittenhouseTown Historic District	RittenhouseTown Historic District	April 27, 1992 (#92001878)	208 Lincoln Drive; 40°01′43″N 75°11′28″W	Fairmount Park	
62	Theodore Roosevelt Junior High School	Theodore Roosevelt Junior High School	November 18, 1988 (#88002317)	430 East Washington Lane; 40°02′54″N 75°10′31″W	Morton	
63	St. Peter's Episcopal Church of Germantown	St. Peter's Episcopal Church of Germantown	September 5, 1985 (#85001960)	6000 Wayne Avenue; 40°02′23″N 75°11′01″W	Germantown	
64	Charles Schaeffer School	Charles Schaeffer School	December 4, 1986 (#86003327)	Germantown Avenue and Abbottsford Road; 40°01′37″N 75°09′37″W	Germantown	
65	Edward B. Seymour House	Edward B. Seymour House	November 5, 1987 (#87001945)	260 West Johnson Street; 40°02′28″N 75°11′13″W	Mount Airy	
66	William C. Sharpless House	William C. Sharpless House	December 29, 1983 (#83004249)	5446 Wayne Avenue; 40°01′47″N 75°10′34″W	Germantown	
67	Smyser and English Pharmacy	Smyser and English Pharmacy	February 20, 2002 (#02000071)	245–247 West Chelten Avenue; 40°01′50″N 75°10′49″W	Germantown	
68	Thomas Mill Covered Bridge	Thomas Mill Covered Bridge	December 1, 1980 (#80003621)	Thomas Mill Road; 40°04′19″N 75°13′32″W	Fairmount Park	
69	Tulpehocken Station Historic District	Tulpehocken Station Historic District	November 26, 1985 (#85003564)	Roughly bounded by McCallum Street, West Walnut Lane, Penn Central railroad tracks, and West Tulpehocken Street; 40°02′17″N 75°10′58″W	Germantown	
70	Upper Roxborough Historic District	Upper Roxborough Historic District	May 2, 2001 (#01000463)	Roughly bounded by Shawmont Avenue, Hagy's Mill Road, and the Schuylkill River; 40°03′24″N 75°14′44″W	Roxborough	Extends into Montgomery County
71	Upsala	Upsala	January 13, 1972 (#72001174)	6430 Germantown Avenue; 40°02′48″N 75°10′59″W	Mount Airy	
72	Sally Watson House	Sally Watson House	March 10, 1982 (#82003818)	5128 Wayne Avenue; 40°01′35″N 75°10′12″W	Germantown	
73	Wayne Junction Historic District	Wayne Junction Historic District	April 16, 2012 (#12000223)	Roughly bounded by W. Berkley Street, Roberts, Germantown, & Wayne Avenues; 40°01′19″N 75°09′45″W	Germantown	Factory buildings surrounding the Wayne Junction station
74	John Wilde and Brother, Inc	John Wilde and Brother, Inc	April 30, 2013 (#13000258)	3737 Main Street; 40°01′00″N 75°12′43″W	Manayunk	
75	Wissahickon	Wissahickon	November 25, 1983 (#83004257)	Schuyler and Queen Streets; 40°01′22″N 75°10′36″W	East Falls	
76	Wissahickon Inn	Wissahickon Inn	December 6, 1979 (#79002333)	500 West Willow Grove Avenue; 40°03′44″N 75°12′31″W	Chestnut Hill	
77	Wissahickon Memorial Bridge	Wissahickon Memorial Bridge	June 22, 1988 (#88000807)	Henry Avenue over Wissahickon Drive; 40°01′27″N 75°11′44″W	Fairmount Park	
78	Woman's Medical College of Pennsylvania	Woman's Medical College of Pennsylvania	November 26, 2008 (#08000785)	3300 Henry Avenue; 40°00′42″N 75°11′03″W	East Falls	
79	Wyck House	Wyck House	October 26, 1971 (#71000736)	6026 Germantown Avenue; 40°02′24″N 75°10′43″W	Germantown	
80	YMCA of Germantown	YMCA of Germantown	November 14, 1991 (#91001709)	5722 Greene Street; 40°02′04″N 75°10′39″W	Germantown	

== See also ==
- List of National Historic Landmarks in Philadelphia
- National Register of Historic Places listings in Philadelphia, Pennsylvania
