= Germantown, Philadelphia =

Germantown
- Neighborhood of Philadelphia
- Market Square, Germantown

- Location within Philadelphia
- Coordinates: 40°02′35″N 75°10′52″W
- Country: United States
- State: Pennsylvania
- County: Philadelphia
- City: Philadelphia
- Founded: October 6, 1683
- Incorporated: August 12, 1689
- Consolidated: February 2, 1854
- Founder: Francis Daniel Pastorius

Area
  - Total: 3.327 sq mi (8.62 km^{2})
- Elevation: 240 ft (73 m)

Population (2010)
  - Total: 75,935
  - Density: 22,820/sq mi (8,812/km^{2})
- Demonym: Germantowner
- Time zone: UTC−5 (EST)
- ZIP Codes: 19144, 19138
- Area code: 215

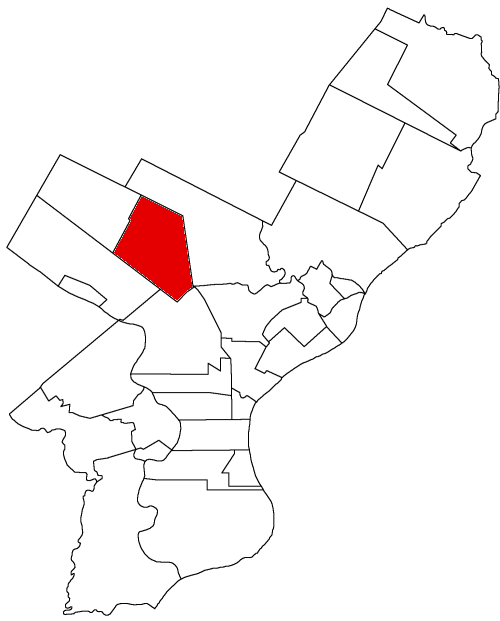
Map of Philadelphia County, Pennsylvania, highlighting Germantown Borough prior to the Act of Consolidation (1854)

Germantown (German: Deutschstadt [ˈdɔʏtʃˌʃtat]) is an area in Northwest Philadelphia, Pennsylvania, United States. Founded by Palatine, Quaker, and Mennonite families in 1683 as an independent borough, it was absorbed into Philadelphia in 1854. The area, which is about six miles northwest from the city center, now consists of two neighborhoods: Germantown and East Germantown. Today, the population is predominantly African-American.

The area is rich in historic sites and buildings from the colonial era, some of which are open to the public. Germantown played a significant role in American history; it was the birthplace of the American antislavery movement, the site of a Revolutionary War battle, the temporary residence of George Washington, the location of the first bank of the United States, and the residence of many notable politicians, scholars, artists, and social activists.

== Boundaries ==
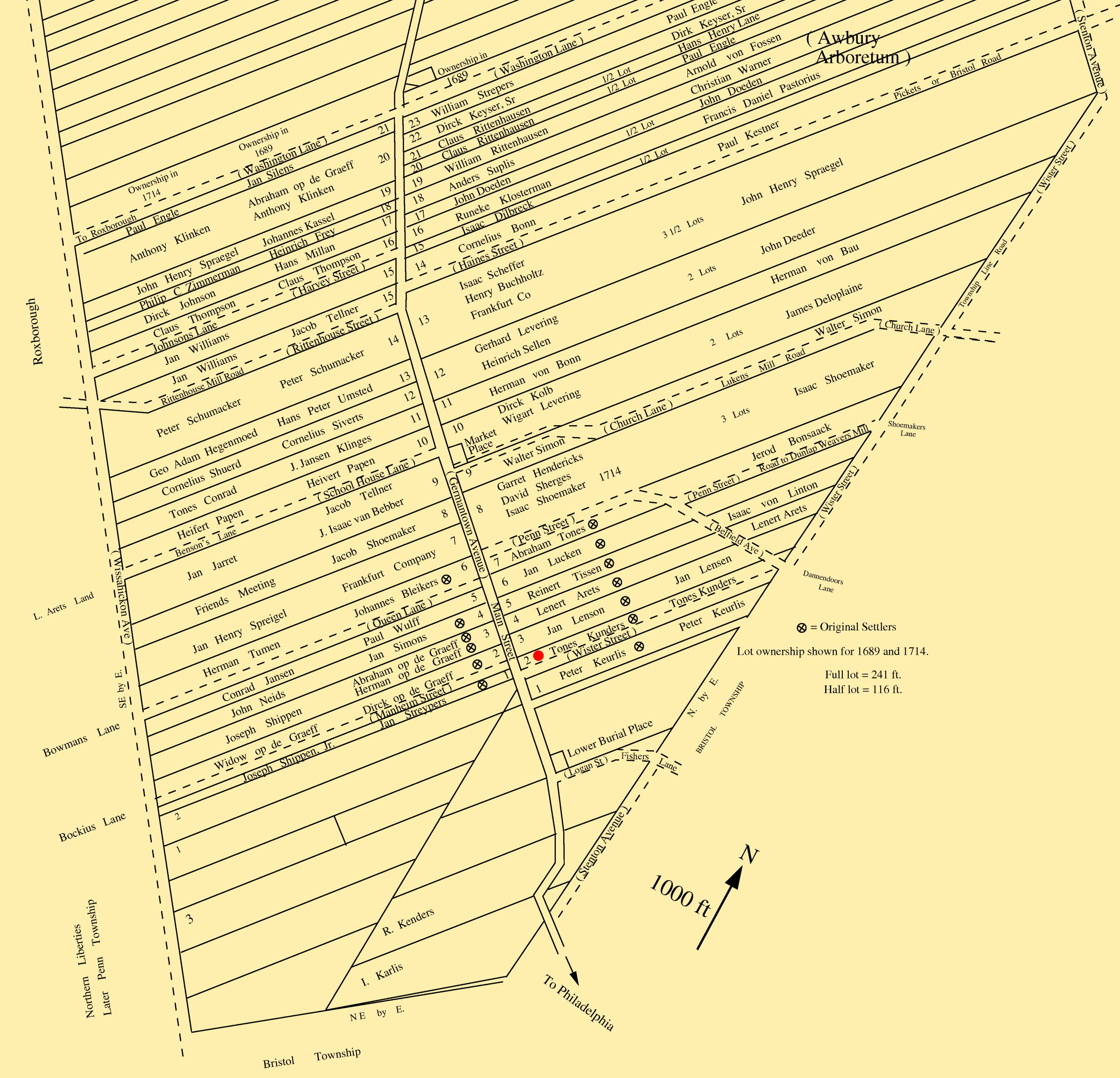
Plan of lots in Germantown, Pennsylvania, in 1689, showing lot owners in 1689 and 1714

Germantown stretches for about two miles along Germantown Avenue northwest from Windrim and Roberts Avenues. Germantown has been consistently bounded on the southwest by Wissahickon Avenue, on the southeast by Roberts Avenue, and on the east by Wister Street and Stenton Avenue, but its northwest border has expanded and contracted over the years. When first incorporated as a borough in 1689, Germantown was separated from the rural Germantown Township by Washington Lane; later, the border was expanded to Carpenter and East Gorgas Lanes; it was then rolled back to Washington Lane in 1846, and remained there until the borough was absorbed into Philadelphia in 1854.

Today, the western part of the former borough is the neighborhood known simply as "Germantown", though it is sometimes called "West Germantown", and the eastern part is the neighborhood of "East Germantown". While the boundary between the two neighborhoods is not well-defined and has varied over time, currently 'Germantown' usually refers to the part of the former borough that lies west of Germantown Avenue, up through West Johnson Street, and 'East Germantown' to the part that lies east of Germantown Avenue, up through East Upsal Street.

The neighborhood of Mount Airy lies to the northwest, Ogontz and West Oak Lane to the northeast, Logan to the east, Nicetown–Tioga to the south, and East Falls to the southwest.

The majority of Germantown is covered by the 19144 zip code, but the area north of Chew Avenue falls in the 19138 zip code.

== History ==
=== 17th century ===
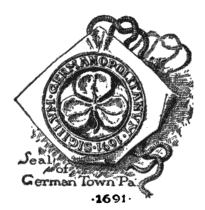
Seal of Germantown in 1691

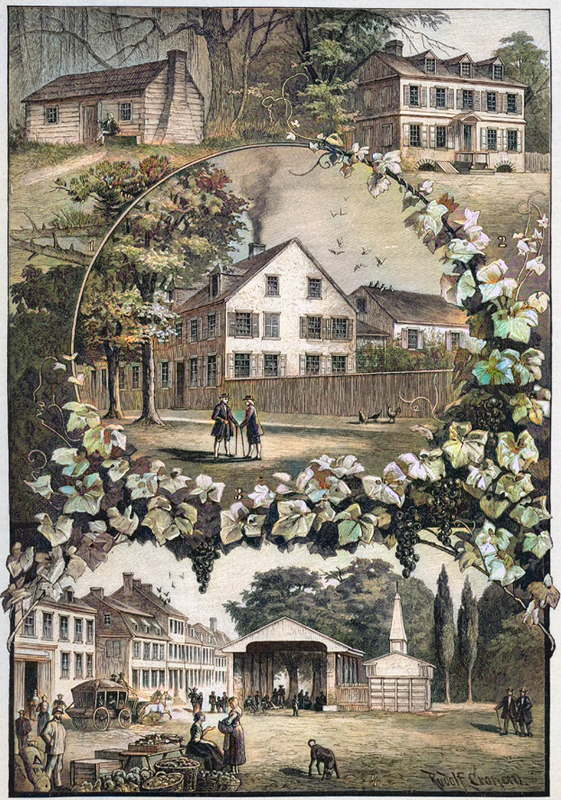
Old Germantown: the Pastorius family residences are shown on the upper left (c. 1683) and upper right (c. 1715), the center structure is the house and printing business of the Caurs family (c. 1735), and the bottom structure is the market place (c. 1820).

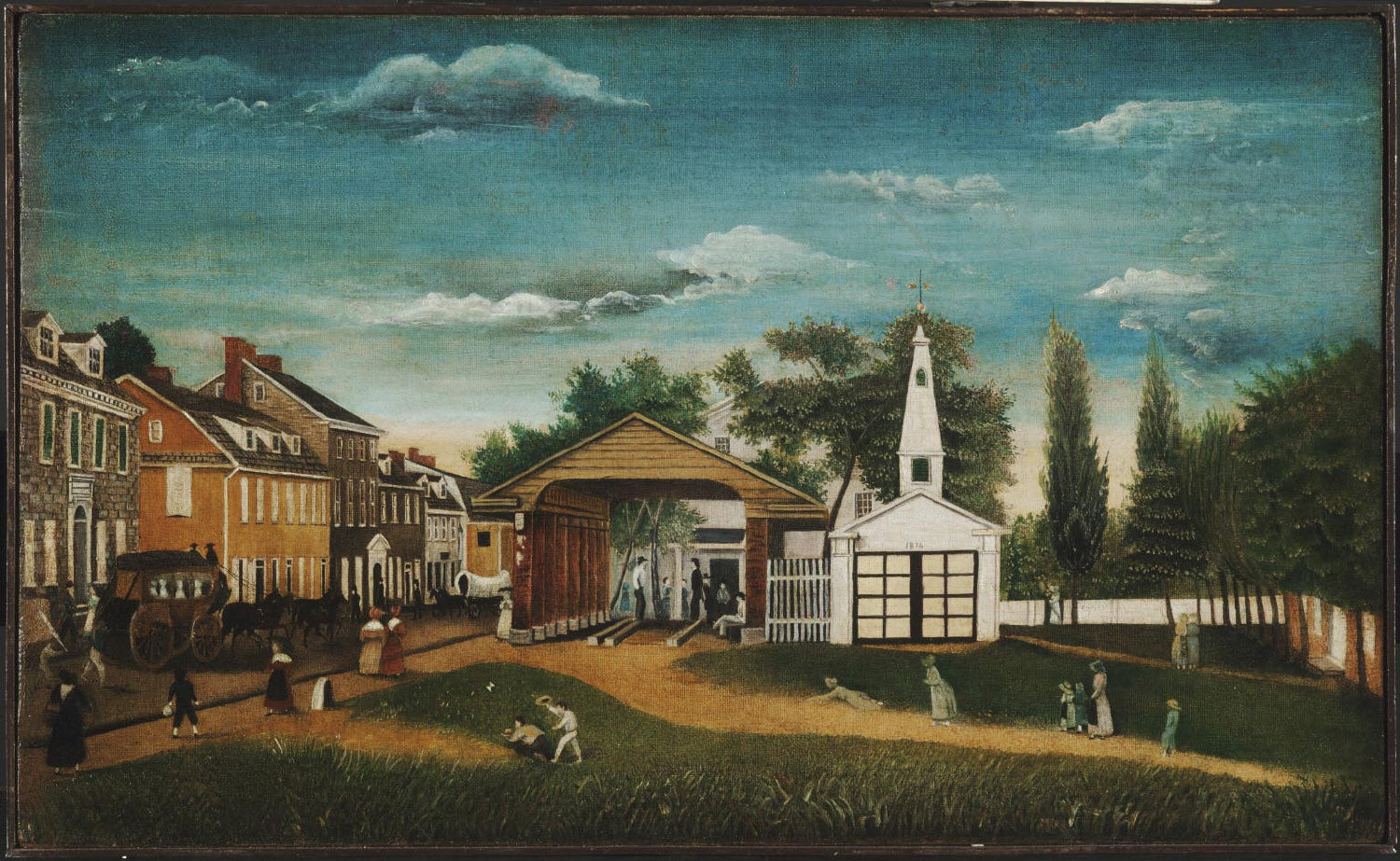
Germantown Market Square, c. 1820

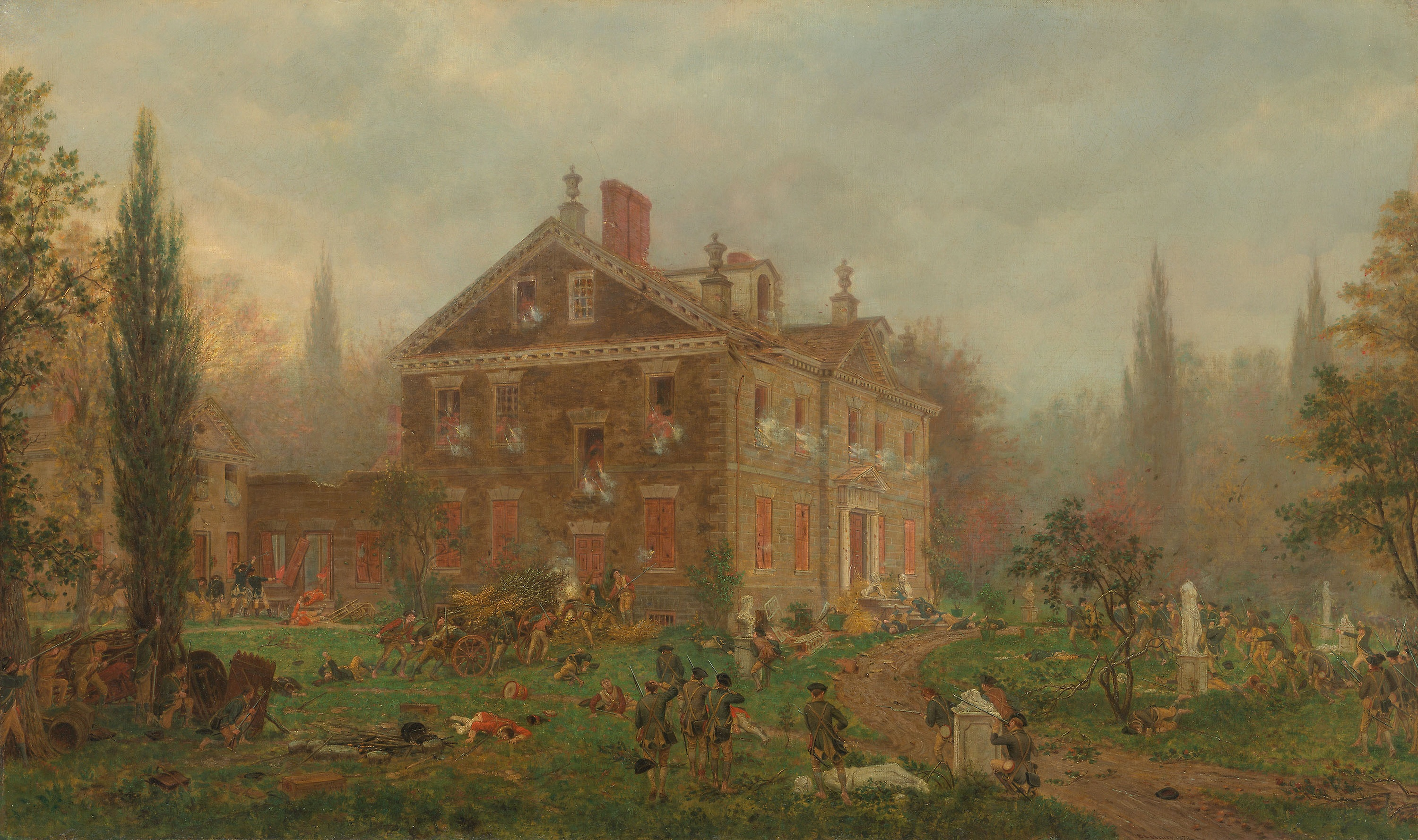
The assault on Cliveden, part of the Battle of Germantown (1777)

Although the arrival by ship of the Original 13, the later founders of Germantown in Philadelphia on October 6, 1683, was later to provide the date for German-American Day, a holiday in the United States, historical research has shown that nearly all of the first thirteen Quaker and Mennonite families were in fact Dutch rather than Germans. These families, which were mainly Dutch but also included some Swiss, had relocated to Krefeld (near the Dutch border) and Monsheim (in Rhineland-Palatinate) some years prior to their emigration to America to avoid persecution of their Mennonite beliefs in the Dutch Republic and Swiss Confederacy. The town was named Germantown by the group's leader Franz Pastorius, a German preacher from Sommerhausen.

The town's population remained largely Dutch-speaking until 1709, after which a number of the Dutch families set out west and a series of major German emigrations reached Germantown and Pennsylvania as a whole. Their initial leader, Pastorius, later aligned himself with newer German arrivals and as the only university-trained and legal and literary man among the early settlers, chronicled and stressed the town's German origins. Adding to the assimilating of Dutch culture was that the direct vicinity of the settlement was already inhabited by fifty-four German families who had accompanied Johan Printz to the Swedish settlement on the Delaware several years before 1683 and had resettled themselves. Pastorius was the first bailiff. Jacob Telner, Derick Isacks op den Graeff and his brother Abraham Isacks op den Graeff, Reynier Tyson, and Tennis Coender (Thones Kunders) were burgesses, besides six committeemen. They had authority to hold "the general court of the corporation of Germantowne", to make laws for the government of the settlement, and to hold a court of record. This court went into operation in 1690, and continued its services for sixteen years.

In 1688, five years after its founding, Germantown became the birthplace of the anti-slavery movement in America. Pastorius, Gerret Hendericks and the brothers Derick and Abraham op den Graeff gathered at Thones Kunders's house and wrote a two-page condemnation of slavery and sent it to the governing bodies of their Quaker church, the Society of Friends. The petition was mainly based upon the Bible's Golden Rule, "Do unto others as you would have them do unto you." Though the Quaker establishment took no immediate action, the 1688 Germantown Quaker Petition Against Slavery was a clear and forceful argument against slavery and initiated the process of banning slavery in the Society of Friends (1776) and Pennsylvania (1780).

=== 18th century ===
In 1723, Germantown became the site of the first congregation of Schwarzenau Brethren in the New World. The Church of the Brethren - among other churches - have their roots in the Schwarzenau Brethren.

When Philadelphia was occupied by the British during the American Revolutionary War, British units were housed in Germantown. In the Battle of Germantown, on October 4, 1777, the Continental Army attacked the garrison. During the battle, a group of civilians fired on the British troops as they marched up the avenue, mortally wounding British officer James Agnew. The Americans withdrew after firing on one another in the confusion of the battle, which resulted in the battle becoming a British victory. The American losses amounted to 673 men and the British losses consisted of 575 men, but along with the American victory at Saratoga on October 17 when John Burgoyne surrendered, the battle led to the official recognition of the Americans by France, which formed an alliance with the Americans afterward.

During his presidency, George Washington and his family lodged at the Deshler-Morris House in Germantown to escape the city and the yellow fever epidemic of 1793. The first bank of the United States was also located here during his administration.

=== 19th century ===
Germantown and adjacent German Township were incorporated into the City of Philadelphia in 1854 by the Act of Consolidation.

Italians began settling Germantown in 1880, and comprised an active and vibrant part of the community.

=== 20th century ===
The significant changes that occurred in Philadelphia's demographics at the start of the 20th century caused major shifts in Germantown's ethnic makeup as well. When the first wave of the Great Migration brought more than 140,000 African Americans to the city from the South, long-established Philadelphians started to move to the outskirts. During this time, many German, Scots-Irish, and Irish families moved to Germantown.

During the 1940s, a second mass migration of African Americans from the south to Philadelphia occurred. While the majority of middle-class African American newcomers first settled in North Philadelphia, the housing shortages in this area that followed the end of World War II caused later arrivals to move instead to the Northwest. This led to a wave of new housing construction. To meet the housing needs of the growing numbers of African American families moving into southern Germantown, the Philadelphia Redevelopment Authority allocated $10.6 million for the creation of public housing.

Between 1954 and 1956, Germantown experienced an influx of lower-income African Americans, resulting in a decline in property values and triggering a "white flight" of the majority of white residents to the suburbs. The demographic shift caused a slow but steady decline in central Germantown's upscale shopping district, with the last department store, a J. C. Penney branch, closing in the early 1980s.

=== 21st century ===
As of the 2010 US Census, Germantown proper is 77% black, 15% white, 3% Latino, and 2% Asian, and East Germantown is 92% black, 3% white, 2% Latino, and 2% Asian.

Eugene Stackhouse, a retired former president of the Germantown Historical Society says that the demographic transition of Germantown into a predominantly black neighborhood was the result of the now illegal practice of blockbusting. "It was a great disgrace. Cheap houses would be sold to a black family, then the realtors would go around and tell the neighbors that the blacks are invading", said Stackhouse. The practice was used to trigger panic selling.

== Education ==
=== Primary and secondary schools ===
==== Public schools ====
Germantown is zoned to the School District of Philadelphia. Public schools located in Germantown include the Anna L. Lingelbach School (K–8), the John B. Kelly School (K–6), the John Wister Elementary School (K–6), the Hill Freedman Middle School (6–8), the Theodore Roosevelt Middle School (7–8), the Fitler Academics Plus School (1–8), and the Martin Luther King High School (9–12). The Robert Fulton Elementary School and Germantown High School, a regional public high school located in Germantown, were both closed in 2013.

==== Charter schools ====
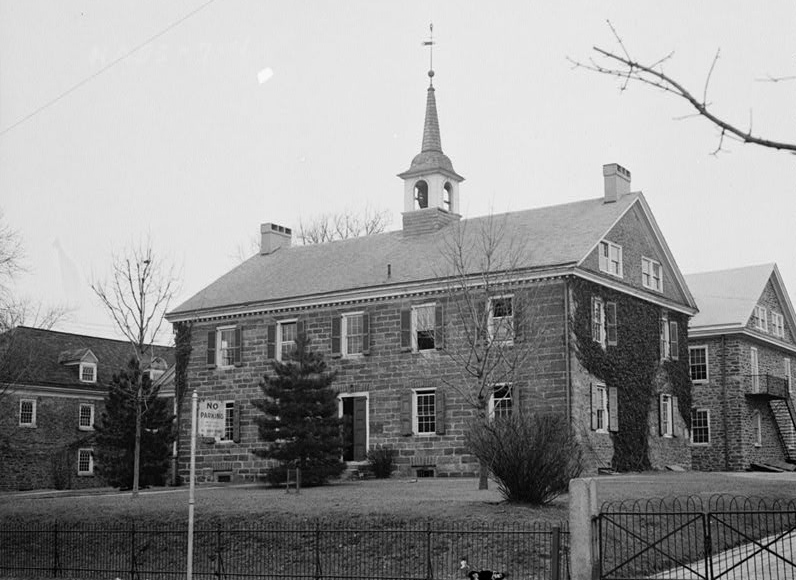
Pennsylvania School for the Deaf

Mastery Charter Schools operates the Mastery Charter Pickett Campus (7–12, MCPC) in Germantown. The school opened in August 2007. The charter system headquarters is located at Pickett. Germantown Settlement Charter School (5–8), Imani Education Circle Charter school (pre-K to 8), and the Wissahickon Charter School's Awbury Campus (6th–8th) is located in the neighborhood . The Pennsylvania School for the Deaf, a private state-chartered school, occupies the former site of Germantown Academy, which moved to Fort Washington, Pennsylvania, in 1965.

==== Private schools ====
Germantown's private schools include the DePaul Catholic School (K–8), Waldorf School of Philadelphia (PreK-8), the High Street Christian Academy (K–4), the Germantown Islamic School, the Green Tree School (special education, ages 6–21), and two Quaker schools: Germantown Friends School and Greene Street Friends School.

Nearby private schools include Mount Airy's Revival Hill Christian High School (9–12), Blair Christian Academy (PreK–12), Islamic Day School of Philadelphia (PreK–5), Project Learn School (K–8), Classroom on Carpenter Lane (K-2), and Holy Cross School (K–8), as well as Chestnut Hill's Springside School (PreK–12), Chestnut Hill Academy (K–12), and Crefeld School (7–12). The William Penn Charter School (commonly known as Penn Charter), the oldest Quaker school in the world, is located in nearby East Falls.

=== Higher education ===
La Salle University is in both Germantown and historic Belfield. Its west campus is centered on the old Germantown Hospital buildings and property, which it purchased in 2007. Other universities and colleges close to Germantown include Drexel University College of Medicine's Queen Lane Medical Campus, Arcadia University, Chestnut Hill College, The Lutheran Theological Seminary at Philadelphia, Philadelphia University, and Saint Joseph's University.

=== Other teaching institutions ===
Settlement Music School, the largest community school of the arts in the United States, operates one of its six branches in Germantown.

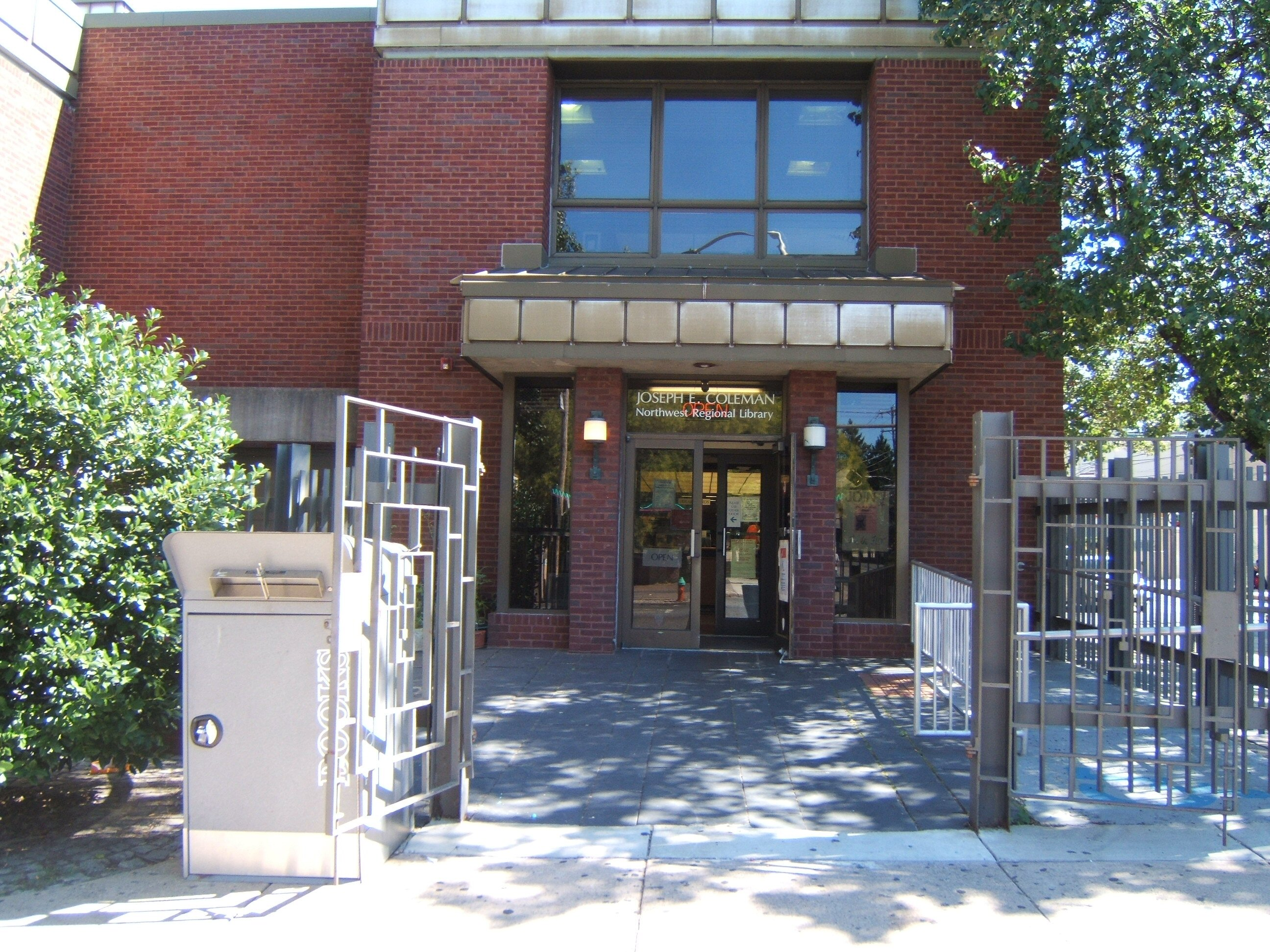
Joseph E. Coleman Northwest Regional Library

=== Public libraries ===
Free Library of Philadelphia operates public libraries. The Joseph E. Coleman Northwest Regional Library is located in Germantown. The library was given its current name in 2002, after Joseph E. Coleman, a member of the Philadelphia City Council.

== Transportation ==
The first railroad in Philadelphia was the Philadelphia, Germantown and Norristown Railroad, which linked Germantown to a station at 9th and Green Streets in Center City. It opened in 1832, and was initially powered by horses. The inventor Matthias W. Baldwin built his first commissioned steam locomotive for the new railroad. Nicknamed Old Ironsides, it eventually reached a peak speed of 28 mph.

Today two SEPTA Regional Rail lines connect the neighborhood to Center City: the Chestnut Hill West Line with stops at Queen Lane, Chelten Avenue, and Tulpehocken stations; and the Chestnut Hill East Line with stops at Wister, Germantown, and Washington Lane stations.

The neighborhood is also served by bus routes 18, 23 (formerly a trolley line), 26, 41, 53 (formerly a trolley line), 65, 71 and 81, and K.

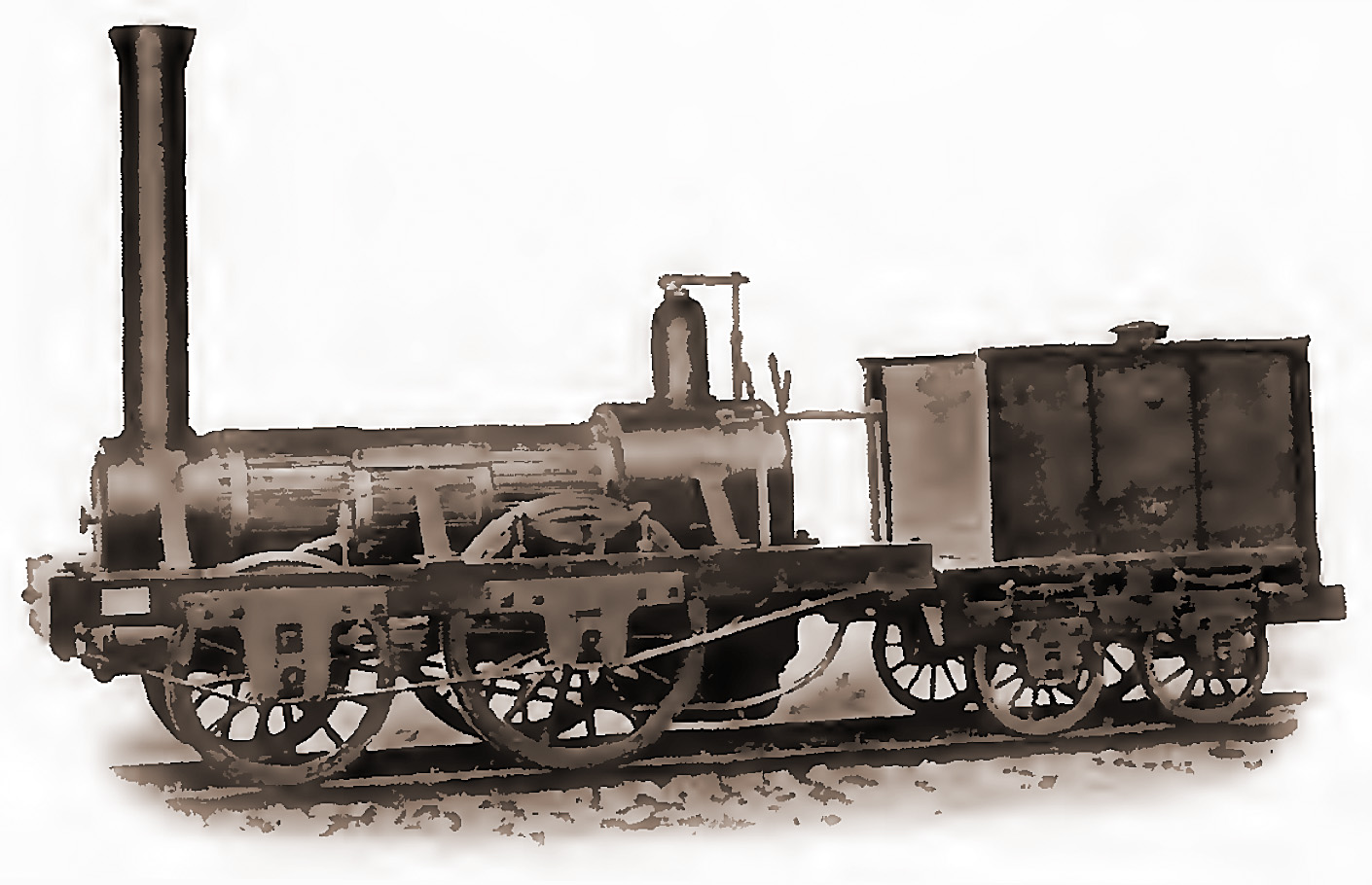
Baldwin's "Old Ironsides" (1832)

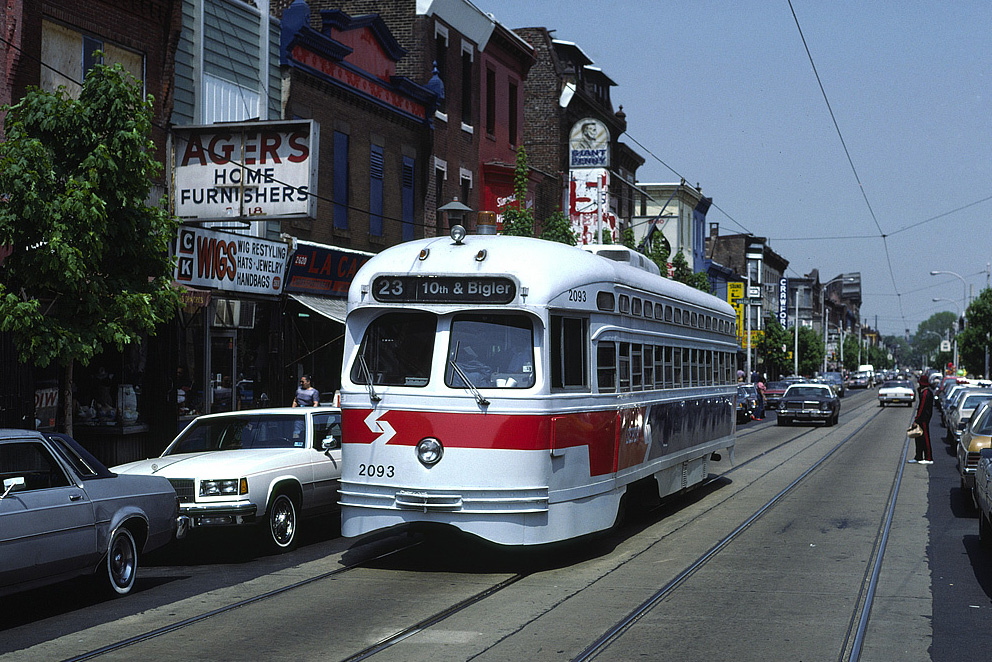
Route 23 trolley on Germantown Avenue (1985)

== Parks and recreation areas ==
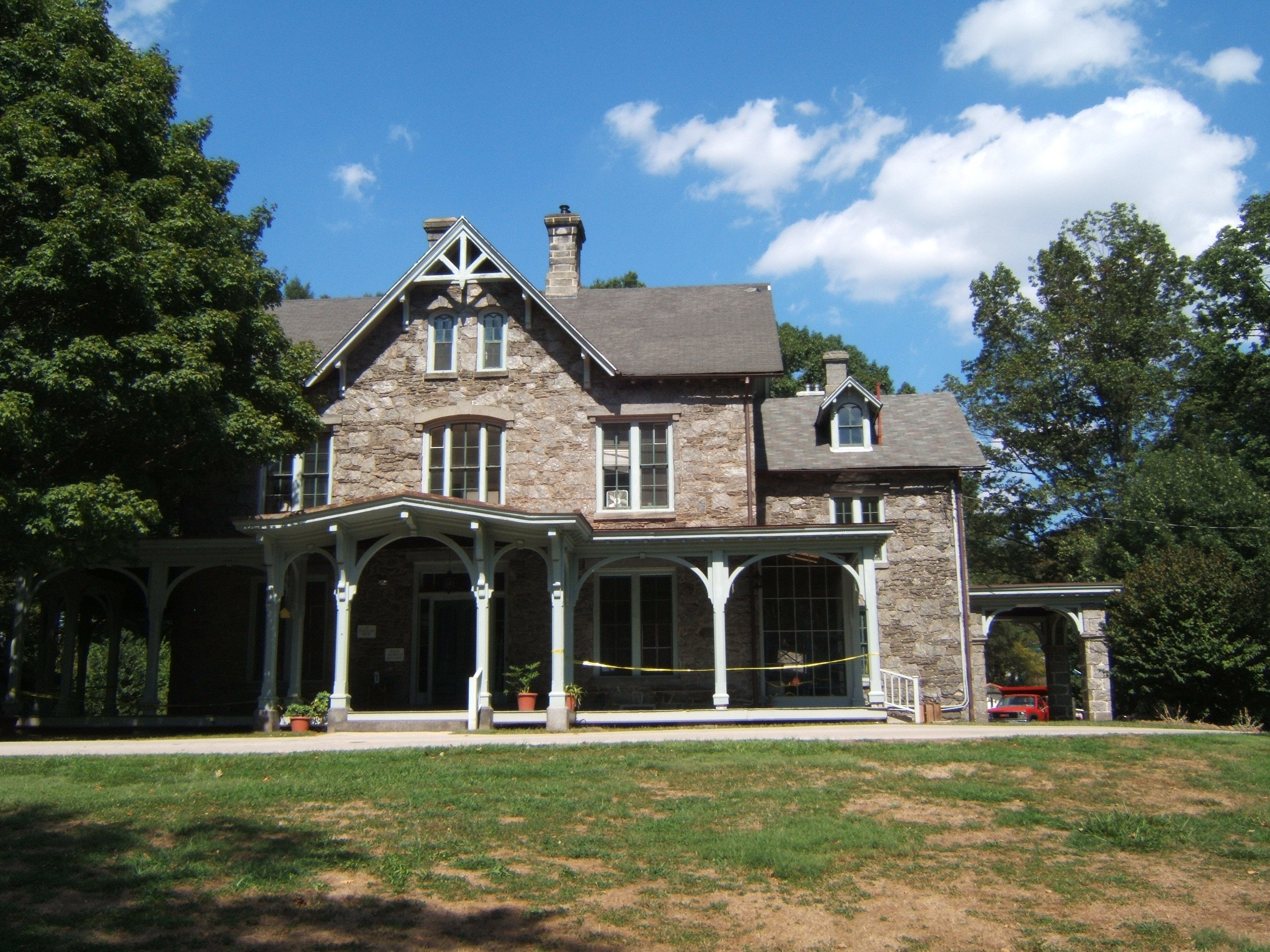
Francis Cope House, offices of the Awbury Arboretum

Germantown has numerous parks and recreation areas. These include:

- Awbury Arboretum, a historic 55-acre arboretum and estate
- Carpenter Park
- Clifford Park
- Cliveden Park
- Cloverly Park
- East Germantown Recreation Center
- Fernhill Park
- Germantown Cricket Club (private)
- Hansberry Garden and Nature Center
- Happy Hollow Playground
- Howell Park
- Kelly Playground
- Loudoun Park
- Vernon Park
- Waterview Recreation Center
- Wissahickon Valley Park (bordering), a 1400-acre park that is part of the Fairmount Park system.
- Wister's Woods Park (bordering)

== Historic sites ==
=== National Historic Landmark Districts ===
- Colonial Germantown Historic District
- Rittenhousetown Historic District

=== National Historic Districts ===
- Awbury Historic District
- Tulpehocken Station Historic District

=== National Historic Landmarks ===
- Cliveden, the estate of Benjamin Chew, an important site during the Battle of Germantown, open to the public
- Germantown Cricket Club
- John Johnson House, a site on the Underground Railroad, open to the public
- Charles Willson Peale House
- Wyck House, open to the public

=== National Register of Historic Places ===
Other sites listed separately on the NRHP:

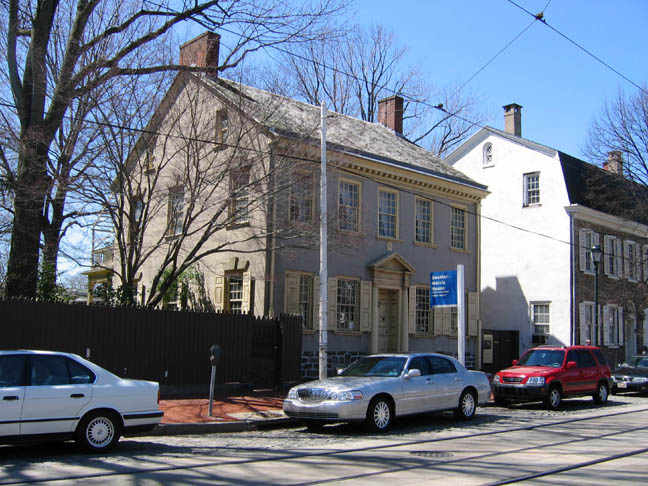
5442 Germantown Avenue, The Deshler-Morris House (1773)

- Alden Park Manor
- Beggarstown School
- Conyngham-Hacker House
- Delmar Apartments
- Deshler-Morris House
- Fitler School
- Germantown Grammar School
- Grumblethorpe
- Howell House
- Loudoun Mansion
- Ebenezer Maxwell House
- Mayfair House
- Oaks Cloister
- Thomas Meehan School
- Mennonite Meetinghouse
- Charles Schaeffer School
- Upsala
- Grumblethorpe Tenant House
- St. Peter's Episcopal Church of Germantown
- William C. Sharpless House
- Smyser and English Pharmacy
- Sally Watson House
- Wyck House
- YMCA of Germantown

=== Gallery of historic houses and architecture ===
Selected historic architecture of Germantown

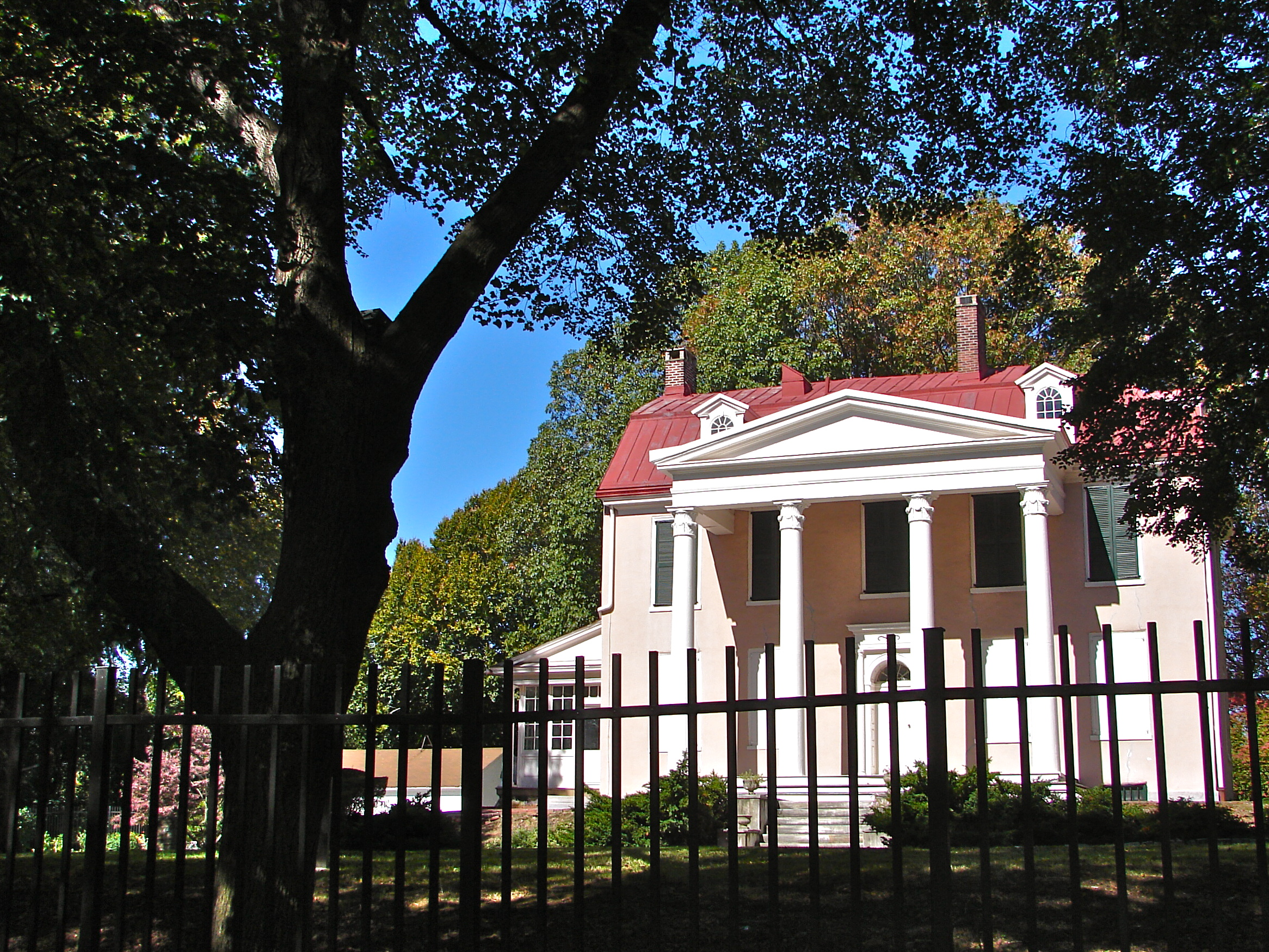
Loudoun Mansion, 4650 Germantown Ave.

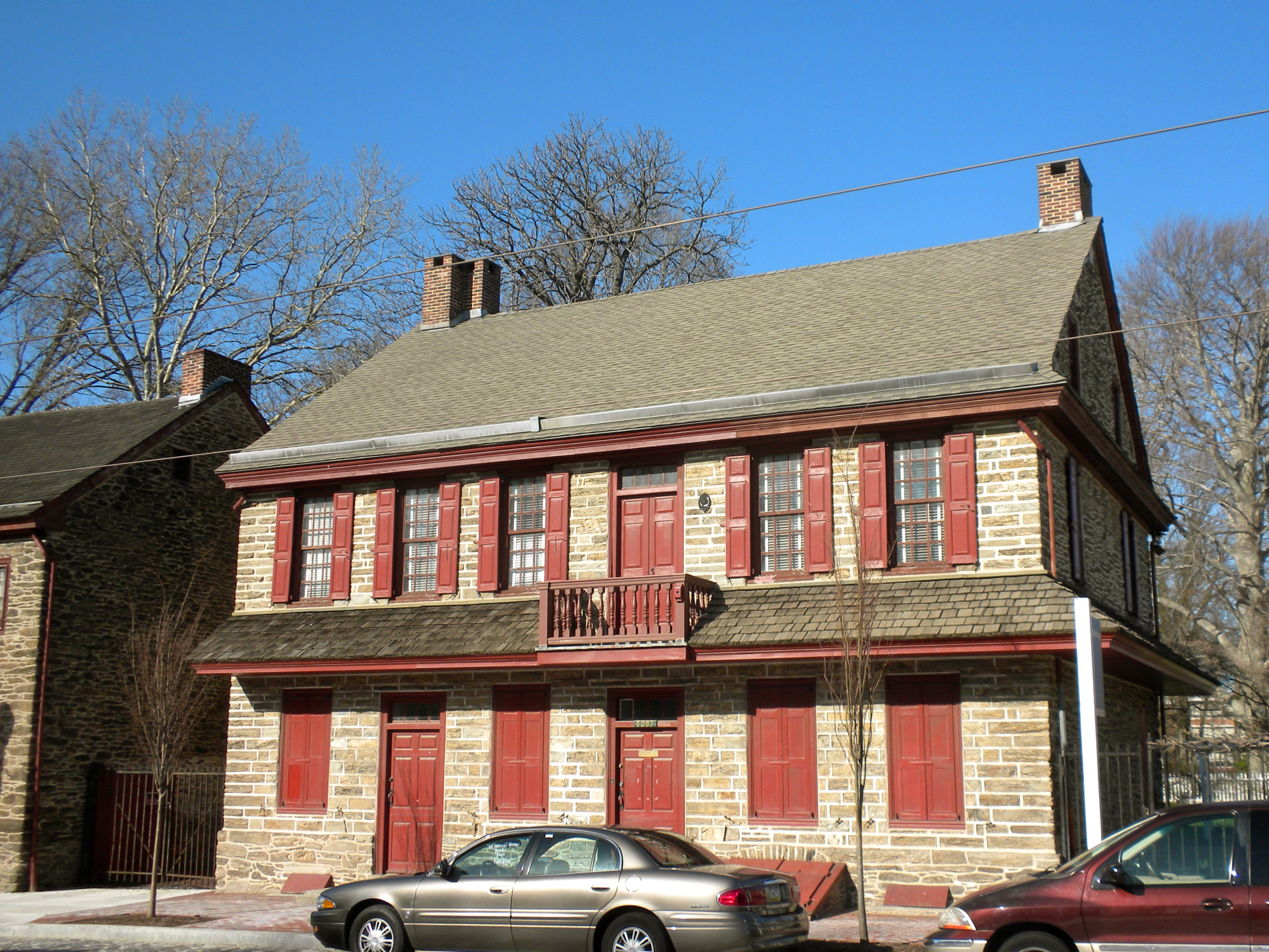
Grumblethorpe, 5267 Germantown Ave.

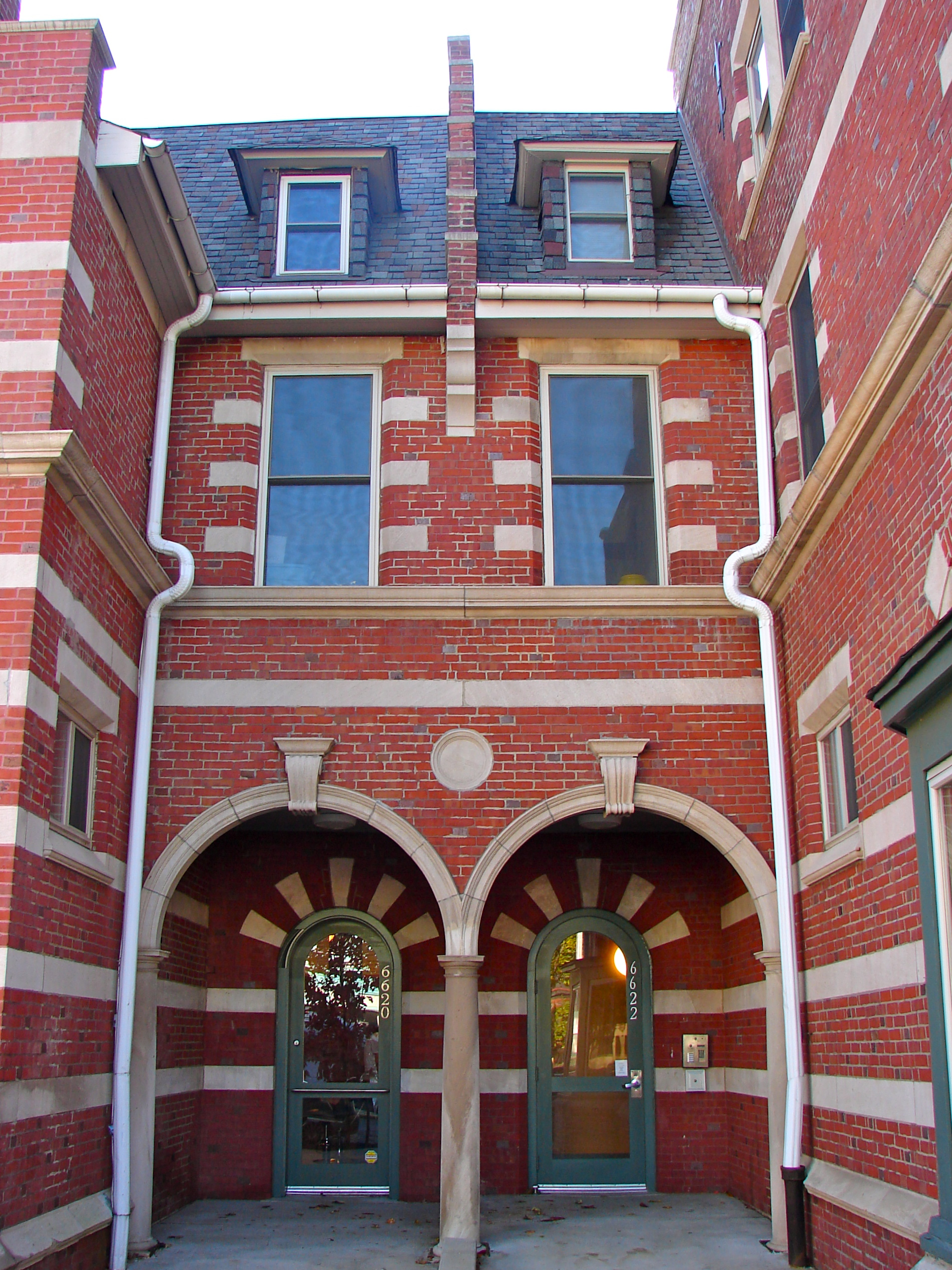
Winston Commons, 6620-6624 Germantown Ave.

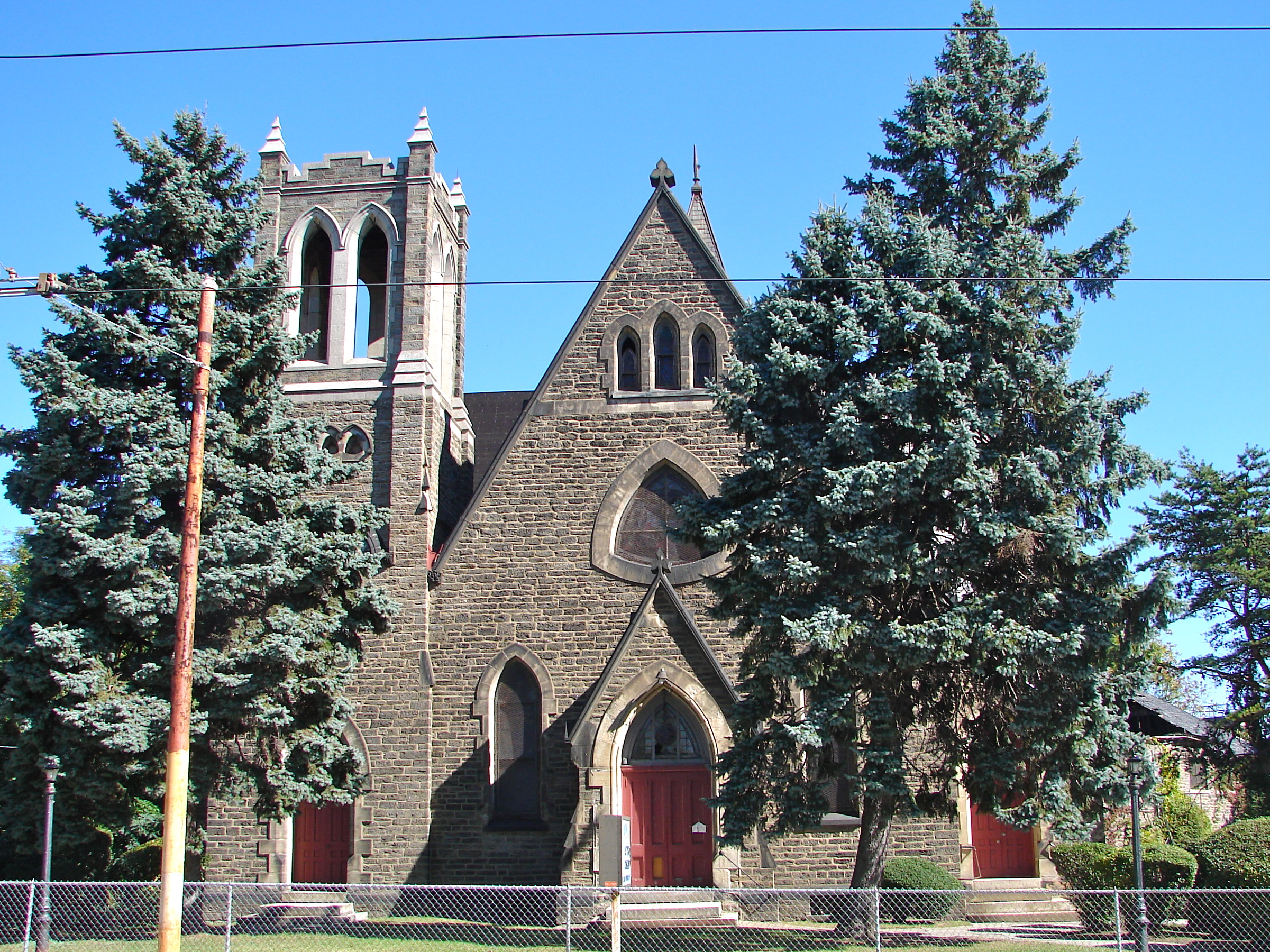
Original Wakefield Presbyterian Church, 4705 Germantown Ave.

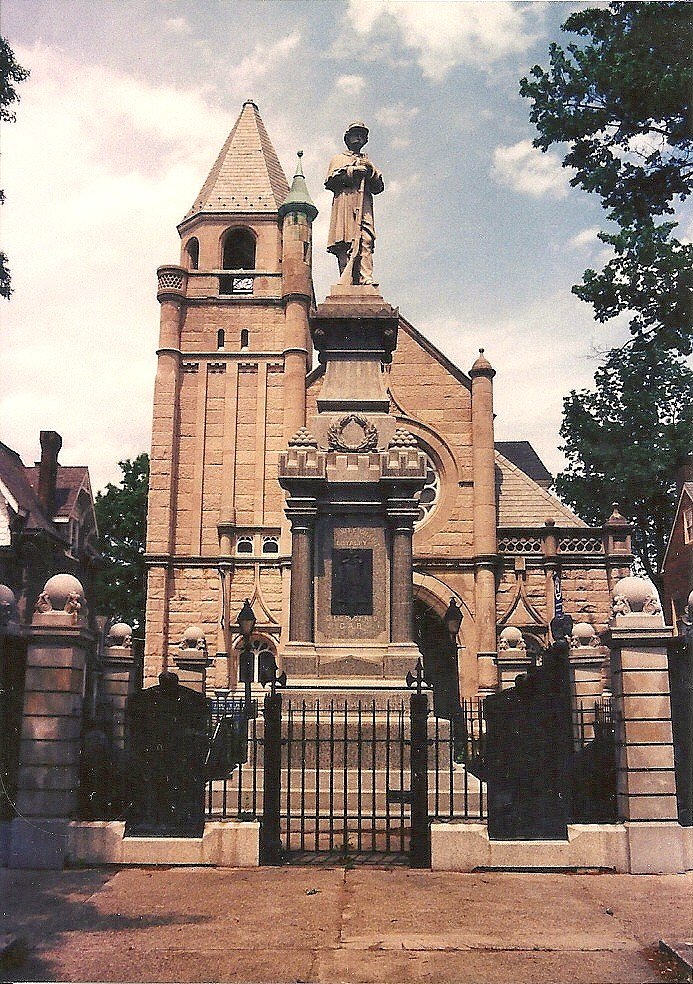
Market Square Presbyterian Church and Civil War Monument

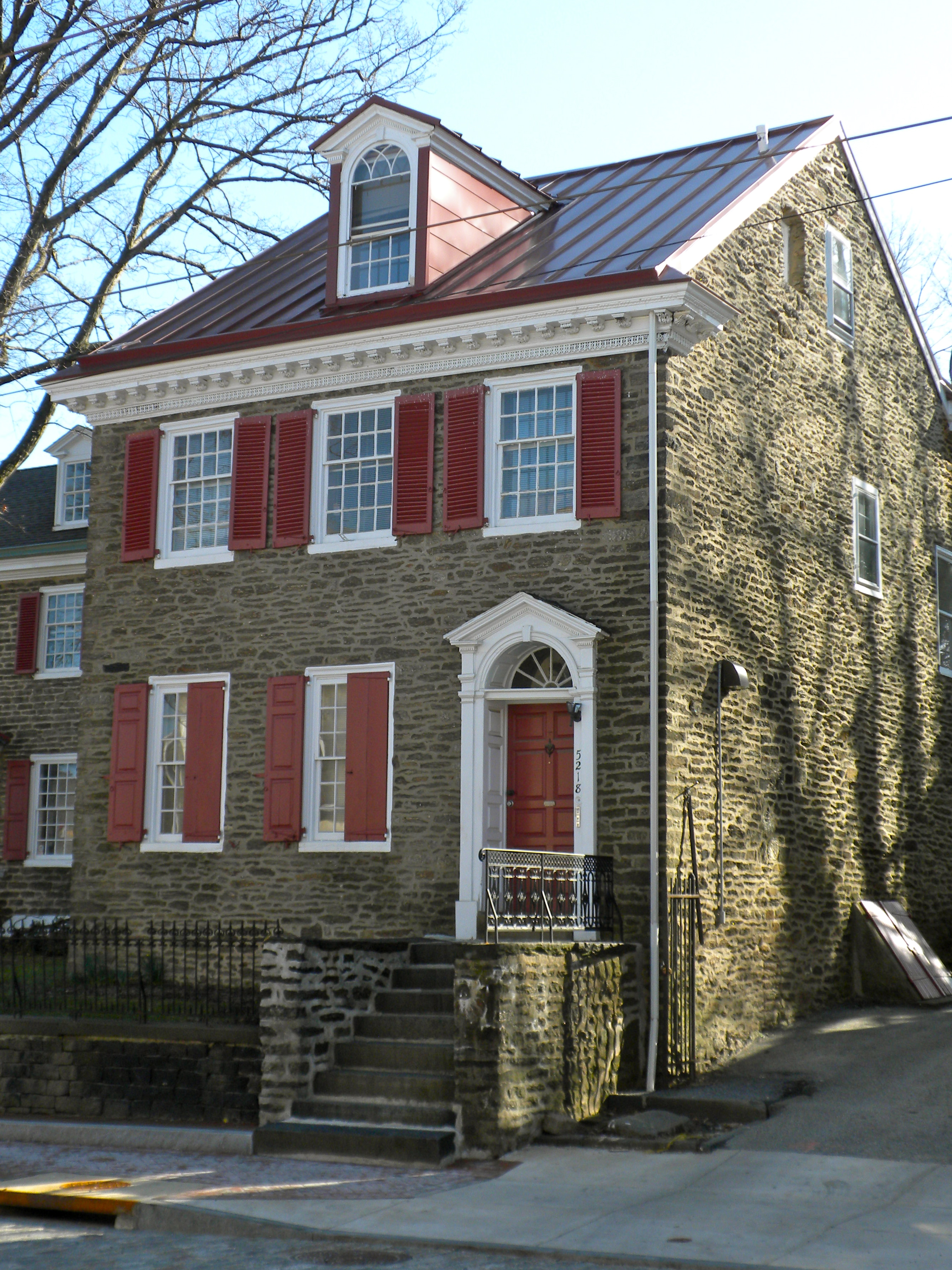
Howell House, at 5218 Germantown Ave.

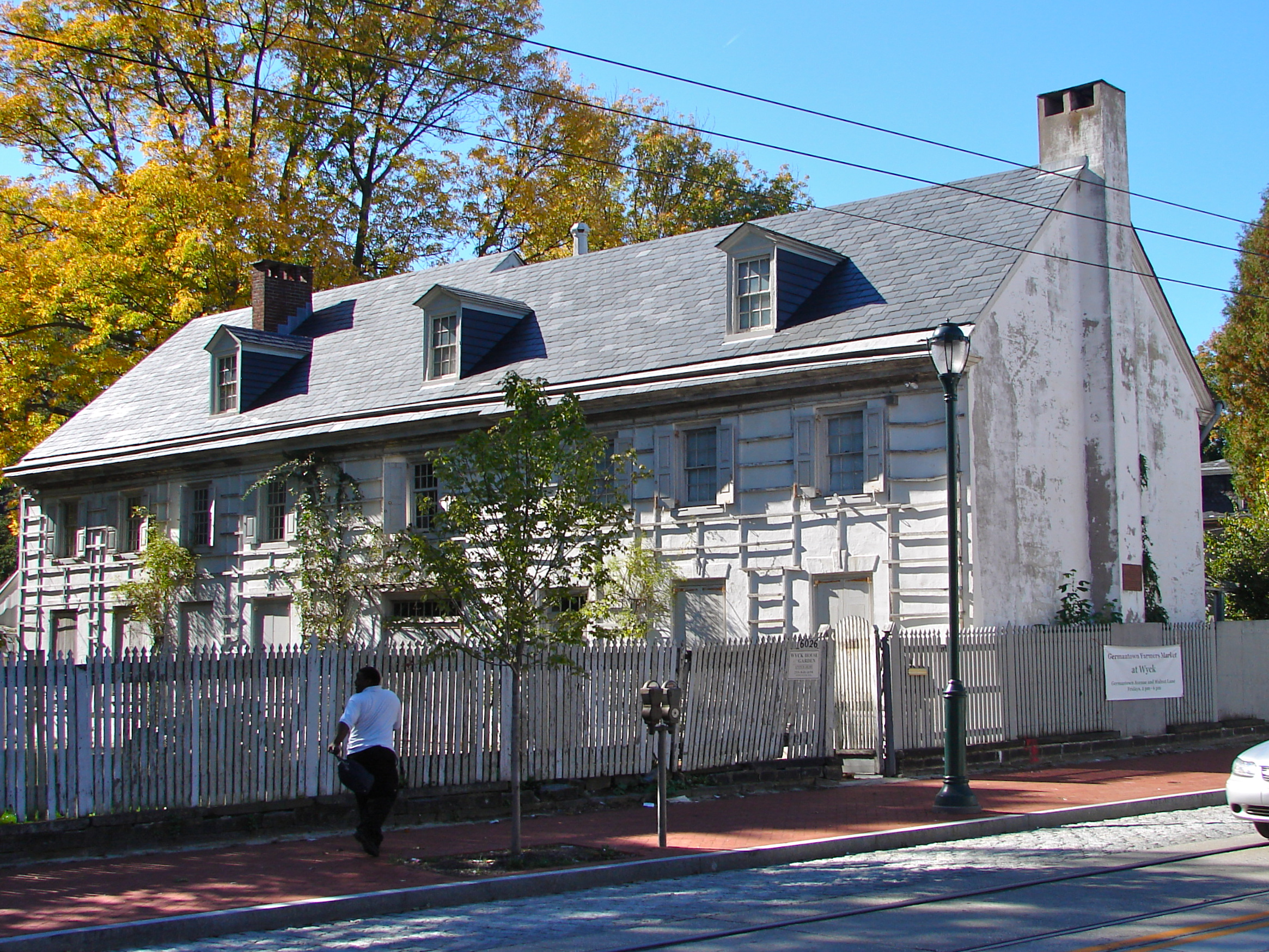
Wyck House, 6026 Germantown Ave.

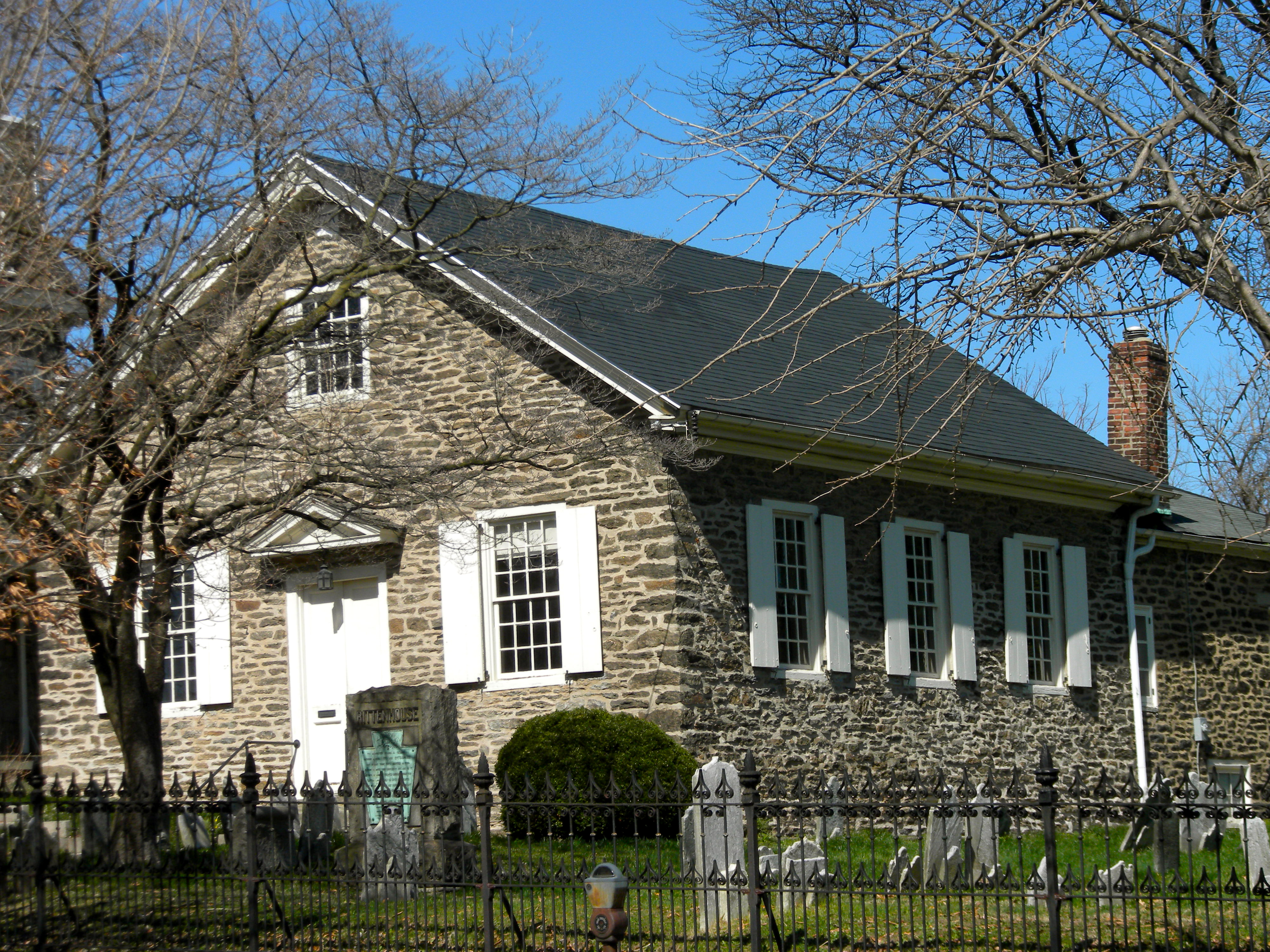
Germantown Mennonite Meetinghouse, 6119 Germantown Ave.

=== Other historic buildings, places, and sites ===
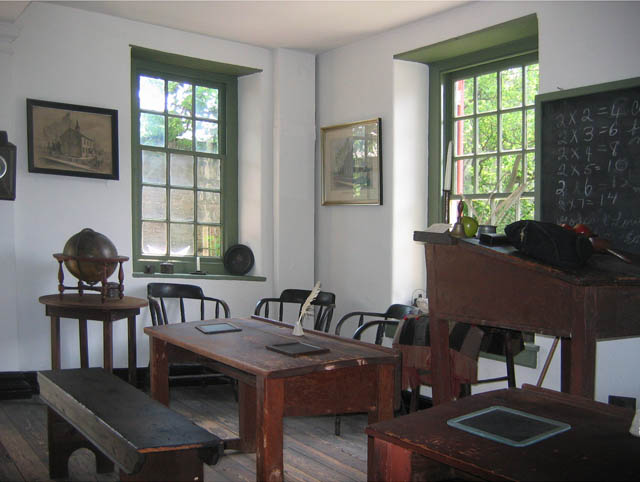
The Concord School (1775), 6308 Germantown Avenue

- Barron House
- Boxwood, 156 W. School House Lane, 1897-98
- Concord School House
- The Francis Strawbridge House, Wissahickon Avenue, Germantown
- The Germantown Boys' Club, 23 W. Penn Street, 1898-1909
- Germantown High School, 5901-13 and 5915-41 Germantown Avenue
- Gilbert Stuart Studio
- Green Tree Tavern (Germantown)
- The Jonathan Graham House, 5356 Chew Avenue, Germantown
- The King Green House, 5112-14 Germantown Avenue
- The Leibert House, 6950 Germantown Avenue, c. 1800-08
- Little Wakefield, 1701 Lindley Avenue
- Lower Burial Ground (Hood Cemetery)
- The Lutheran Theological Seminary Historic District, Mt. Airy
- The Connie Mack House
- The Methodist Episcopal Church of the Advocate, 5250 Wayne Avenue, Germantown, Philadelphia, PA
- St. Michael's Lutheran Church, 6671 Germantown Avenue, Mt. Airy, ca. 1728-1897
- Mitchell, Fletcher, & Co., Inc., 5708 Germantown Avenue, Germantown, c. 1811-1911
- The Upper Burial Ground
- Vernon Park
- The Wachsmuth-Henry House, 4908 Germantown Avenue, c. 1760
- Woodside, The Dorfeuille-Hacker Country Seat, 339 E. Wister Street, c. 1797

== In popular culture ==
The 1946 book, Bright April, written and illustrated by Marguerite de Angeli, features scenes of 1940s Germantown while addressing the divisive issue of racial prejudice experienced by African Americans.

The 2015 novel Loving Day is set in Germantown.

== Notable people ==
- Herb Adderley, NFL Hall Of Fame defensive back for Green Bay Packers and Dallas Cowboys
- Louisa May Alcott, author of the Little Women series of books
- M. K. Asante, filmmaker, professor, rapper, author
- James Barron, naval hero
- Frankie Beverly, R & B musician, 1946 - 2024. A street in East Germantown named in his honor
- Bilal, singer-songwriter
- Samuel Blair, second Chaplain of the United States House of Representatives
- Anna Richards Brewster, painter
- Elaine Brown, Black Panther Party leader
- Martin Grove Brumbaugh, Governor of Pennsylvania, 1914–1919
- Edward G. Budd, inventor and businessman
- Mary Carr, film actress
- George Washington Carpenter, scientist
- Benjamin Chew, Chief Justice of Pennsylvania
- Clarence Clark, professional tennis player, winner of the U.S. National Championships
- Daniel Clark, Delegate from the Territory of Orleans to the U.S. House of Representatives
- Walter Leighton Clark, American businessman, inventor, and artist
- Joseph Sill Clark, Sr., tennis player
- Florence Van Leer Earle Coates, American poet
- William M. Colladay, Wisconsin politician
- John Conard, member of the U.S. House of Representatives from Pennsylvania
- Bill Cosby, comedian, actor, musician, author, educator
- Wesley E. Craig, US Army major general
- Charles Darrow, credited inventor of the Monopoly game
- Marguerite de Angeli, writer and illustrator of children's books
- Amrit Desai, yogi, founder of the Kripalu Center
- Byron W. Dickson, college football coach
- George Ege, member of the U.S. House of Representatives from Pennsylvania
- James Engle, speaker of the Pennsylvania House of Representatives
- David Fair, community and LGBTQ activist
- Lola Falana, singer, dancer, and actress
- Mantle Fielding, architect
- Sidney George Fisher, author
- Janet Gaynor, film, stage and television actress and painter
- Frederic Gehring, Catholic priest, National Chaplain for the Catholic War Veterans
- Henry Gibson, actor
- Walter B. Gibson, author known for the pulp fiction character The Shadow
- Thomas Godfrey, inventor of the octant
- William Newport Goodell, artist, craftsman, and educator
- Jacob C. Gottschalk, first Mennonite bishop in America
- Abraham op den Graeff, one of the first settlers from Crevelt, Germany who established Germantown and its surrounding Township six miles northwest of Philadelphia, merchant, politician
- Nelson Graves, Philadelphian cricketer
- Carolyn Green, competition swimmer and two-time Pan American Games gold medalist
- Albert M. Greenfield, businessman, political activist, philanthropist; lived in Germantown 1920s–1930s
- Rufus Harley, jazz musician
- Alfred C. Harmer, member of the U.S. House of Representatives from Pennsylvania
- Ross Granville Harrison, biologist and anatomist
- Charles Hoffner, pro golfer, member of first Ryder Cup team
- Bernard Hopkins, professional boxer
- Marcus Jastrow, Talmudic scholar
- Eve, rapper, actress
- Edwin Jellett, writer
- Lindley Johnson, Philadelphia architect
- Lloyd Jones, Olympic athlete
- Florence Kelley, social and political reformer
- Khia, rapper, record producer
- Florence Kirk, American soprano
- Adam Kuhn, physician, professor, and botanist
- Maggie Kuhn, activist, founder of the Gray Panthers
- Maxine Kumin, poet and author
- George Cochran Lambdin, Victorian flower painter
- George Landenberger, 23rd Governor of American Samoa
- Noyes Leech (1921–2010), law professor at the University of Pennsylvania Law School
- George Lippard, novelist, journalist, playwright, social activist, labor organizer
- Eric Lobron, German chess grand master of American descent
- James Logan, statesman
- Sarah Logan Wister Starr, humanitarian
- John W. Lord, Jr., Pennsylvania State Senator, Philadelphia City Councilman, United States District Judge
- Airrion Love, member of the R&B group The Stylistics
- G. Love, born Garrett Dutton III, front man of the musical band G. Love & Special Sauce
- Alexander Mack, leader of the German Baptists
- Connie Mack, the longest-serving manager in Major League Baseball history
- Abe Manley, sports executive
- J. Howard Marshall, wealthy magnate and husband of Anna Nicole Smith
- Logan Marshall, author
- John Alden Mason, archaeological anthropologist and linguist
- Jimmy McGriff, jazz musician
- Robert L. McNeil, Jr., developer of Tylenol and chairman of McNeil Laboratories
- Thomas Meehan, botanist and author
- Thomas Lynch Montgomery, historian and librarian
- George T. Morgan former chief engraver at the United States Mint
- Margaretta Morris, entomologist
- James K. Morrow, writer
- James St. Clair Morton (1829-1864), Military officer in the United States Civil War
- Eleanor Myers, archaeologist
- William Jackson Palmer, founder of Colorado Springs, Colorado
- Francis Daniel Pastorius, leader of the Germantown settlement
- James DeWolf Perry, Presiding Bishop of the Episcopal Church
- Christian Frederick Post, Moravian Church missionary
- Ellen Bernard Thompson Pyle, illustrator known for her Saturday Evening Post covers
- Sun Ra, Jazz musician
- Edmund Randolph, the first United States Attorney General
- Theodore William Richards, recipient of 1914 Nobel Prize in Chemistry
- Mary Davis Ridgway (1873–1927), physician who ran a homeopathic hospital open to poor patients in Germantown
- David Rittenhouse, astronomer, mathematician, first director of the United States Mint
- William Rittenhouse, founded the first paper mill in the colonies
- Owen J. Roberts, Supreme Court Justice
- Ralph J. Roberts, co-founder and former CEO of Comcast
- Charley Ross, four-year-old kidnapping victim in 1874
- Charles Frederick Schaeffer, Lutheran clergyman
- Francis Schaeffer, Christian theologian
- William I. Schaffer, lawyer, Pennsylvania Attorney General and Supreme Court Justice
- J. Barney Sherry, silent film actor
- William Shippen, Philadelphia physician, civic and educational leader who represented Pennsylvania in the Continental Congress
- Benjamin Shoemaker, mayor of Philadelphia
- Ron Sider, founder of Evangelicals for Social Action
- Frederick Smith, lawyer, Pennsylvania Attorney General and Pennsylvania Supreme Court Justice
- Patti Smith, punk rock singer-songwriter, poet and visual artist
- Mike Sojourner, professional basketball player
- Christopher Sower the elder, printed the first German-language Bible in America
- Christopher Sower the younger, clergyman and printer
- Christopher Sower III, loyalist printer
- Martin Luther Stoever, Lutheran educator and writer
- Witmer Stone, ornithologist and botanist
- Gilbert Stuart, portrait artist
- Walter Stuempfig, Romantic realism artist
- Clyde Summers, lawyer and educator who advocated for labor union democracy
- Thomas De Lage Sumter, U.S. Representative from South Carolina
- Frederick Winslow Taylor, engineer, management theorist, and consultant
- Meldrick Taylor, professional boxer
- Russell Thompkins, Jr., songwriter of the R&B group The Stylistics
- Bill Tilden, tennis player
- Henry van Dyke, author, educator, and clergyman
- George Washington, first president of the United States. Lived in Germantown briefly at the Deshler-Morris House
- Grover Washington, Jr., saxophonist
- Ora Washington, professional tennis player
- Jesse Watters, conservative political commentator
- William Walter Webb, Episcopal bishop
- Langhorne Wister, Civil War brevet brigadier general
- Owen Wister, author
- Sally Wister, Philadelphia campaign diarist
- Jeremiah Wright, Black theology pastor
- John Zacherle, television host, radio personality and voice actor
- PnB Rock, R&B singer, rapper, composer
- Mike Mentzer, Bodybuilder

== See also ==
- German American
- German-American Day
