= Martin Luther Stoever =

American historian

Martin Luther Stoever (born in Germantown, Pennsylvania, 17 February 1820; died there, 22 July 1870) was a United States Lutheran educator and writer. His biographical work earned him the title of “The Plutarch of the Lutheran Church.”

== Biography ==
With the ministry in view he entered Pennsylvania College (now Gettysburg College), Gettysburg, and graduated in 1838, but he was pressed into service as an instructor before he could begin his theological course. Until his death, he was engaged in teaching. He was principal of a classical academy in Maryland 1838-1842, and of the preparatory department in Pennsylvania College in 1842-1851, professor of history in the collegiate department in 1844-1851, and professor of Latin and history, to which political economy was added in 1855, from 1851 until his death in 1870. After the retirement of Charles P. Krauth from the presidency of the college in 1850, he discharged the duties of that office for many months, until a successor was elected.

The honorary degree of Ph.D. was conferred upon him in 1866 by Hamilton College, and that of LL.D. in 1869 by Union College. In 1862 the presidency of Girard College, Philadelphia, was offered to him, and in 1869 the professorship of Latin in Muhlenberg College, Allentown, Pennsylvania, but he declined both.

== Writing ==
He was connected with the Evangelical Quarterly Review from its beginning in 1849, and was its sole editor from 1857 until his death. His biographical articles earned him the title of “The Plutarch of the Lutheran Church.” He was also editor of the Literary Record and Linnaean Journal, in Gettysburg, 1847-1848, and published:

- Memoir of the Life and Times of Henry Melchior Muhlenberg, D.D. (Philadelphia. 1856)
- Memorial of Philip P. Mayer, D. D. (1859)
- Brief Sketch of the Lutheran Church in this Country (1860)
- Discourse before the Lutheran Historical Society (Lancaster, 1862)
