= William Newport Goodell =

American painter

- William N. Goodell with Self Portrait, 1936; Photo: Rod Wyatt
- Born: August 16, 1908; Philadelphia, Pennsylvania, U.S.
- Died: San Diego, California, U.S.
- Education: Pennsylvania Academy of the Fine Arts
- Known for: Painting
- Relatives: Betsy Ross (3rd Great-Grandmother)

William Newport Goodell (1908–1999) was an American artist, craftsman, and educator. He was born August 16, 1908, in Germantown, Philadelphia and briefly attended the Pennsylvania Academy of the Fine Arts (PAFA), including its country school in Chester Springs, studying under Pennsylvania impressionist Daniel Garber and noted academician Joseph Thurman Pearson Jr., before opening his own studio on Germantown Avenue in 1929.

Between 1930 and 1949 Goodell was represented via jury or invitation in a range of major annual and special exhibitions on the East Coast and won several cash awards and purchase prizes, including the First Hallgarten Prize at the National Academy of Design annual exhibition in New York in 1933. He also exhibited at the Art Institute of Chicago, the Corcoran Gallery of Art, Washington D.C., the Albright Art Gallery, Buffalo, N.Y., the Philadelphia Museum of Art, the PAFA, and Woodmere Art Museum, among other notable venues.

During the 1940s, Goodell served with Pearson on the Woodmere Art Museum's "very vigorous exhibition committee", and for several years as a member of the exhibition committee of the Fellowship of the PAFA. He was described as one of a handful of “important young Pennsylvania artists” in a Works Progress Administration state guide.

== Background ==
Goodell came from an old Quaker family, the youngest of four children born to Edward Prime Goodell and Mary Goodell, née Newport. His sisters Anne Goodell Lathrop and Margaret Goodell Claxton were accomplished impressionist painters, and his brother Edward P. Goodell pursued photography.

== Style and subjects ==
Goodell worked in oils, watercolor and pastels. While his broken brushwork and interest in light effects reflected the influence of impressionism, he was equally if not more concerned with pictorial design. His easel paintings were bold both in scale and technique and his compositions dynamic, typically combining vigorous diagonal angles and a lofty perspective. Use of impasto, the palette knife, and boldly outlined figures and objects were techniques that contributed to a rugged representational style. Goodell favored full length figure paintings, sometimes in a plein aire setting (Pastoral, Jimmie Reading), in addition to still lifes, landscapes, and subjects with an element of humor or social commentary (Isolationist, Liberty and the Pursuit of Happiness).

== Influences ==
Goodell would have been well aware the work of artists who became known as the Pennsylvania Impressionists, also called the Bucks County Impressionists, who worked in and around New Hope, north of Philadelphia.

Willows in Sunlight

Besides Pearson and Garber, Goodell's instructors during his short stay at the PAFA included Henry McCarter and Hugh Breckenridge. Garber was an early member of the New Hope art colony and an influential teacher. Garber's technique of backlighting figures is found in several of Goodell's works in which subjects appear bathed in a halo of light (Pastoral, Willow in Sunlight). Like Garber, Goodell's interest was in creating sense of eternal or spiritual light rather than capturing the ephemeral or fleeting effects associated with impressionism.

Goodell was also connected to New Hope through his sisters, Anne and Margaret Goodell. Anne Goodell married Julian Lathrop, son of William Langson Lathrop, one of the founders of the New Hope art colony, and both Anne and Margaret lived and painted in New Hope. There is evidence that Goodell painted in the New Hope area (Bucks Farm, On the Bridge), but his studio remained in Philadelphia, and the influence of impressionism both in terms of subject matter and technique was less direct than on his older siblings.

Goodell's work also reflects other stylistic influences of the period. His energetic representationalism echoed American Regionalism (Church), a movement influential through the early 1940s, and the bold, graphic style of public works being commissioned under the Federal Art Project, the visual arts arm of the New Deal Works Progress Administration (WPA) (Making Sally’s Pigtails). Watercolors of urban and night scenes are reminiscent of American Realism, but while this movement expressed the alienation of modern life, Goodell's portrayals were never desolate (Sun Patterns, Steaming Off). Overall, Goodell's work is characterized by a vitality, sincerity and positivity that were perhaps a debt to his Quaker roots.

== War years ==
World War II interrupted Goodell's burgeoning art and exhibition career. On enlistment in the U.S. Naval Reserve in July 1942 he was made carpenters mate 3rd class because he had made frames for his paintings. He was promoted to Chief Specialist in visual aids in charge of 18 man art department of the Visual Aids Section of the Naval Training Station at Newport, R.I. Away from his studio during this period, he produced a number of freely rendered watercolors and pastels of life on base, in addition to harbor scenes, but fewer large oil paintings (Musician 1st Class, The Piper).

The Wood Engraver, 1948

Goodell was honorably discharged in 1946, and from 1947 to 1951 resumed studio painting and exhibited at the Woodmere Art Gallery, the National Serigraphy Society, N.Y., the Women's City Club of Philadelphia (solo show), and a Regional Exhibition of Oil Painting & Sculpture presented by the PAFA (Womb of Creation).

== California (1951–1999) ==
In 1951 Goodell moved to the West Coast for reasons of his wife's health. In California, Goodell showed in Los Angeles, Laguna Beach, and San Diego but, with fewer exhibition opportunities regionally, his easel painting never regained its former momentum. From 1951 to 1959 he worked as a scientific illustrator at the Navy Electronics Laboratory in San Diego, and in 1959 served as art director at Warner Technical Publications. He dedicated his later years to teaching art and to creative projects in the local community, including dioramas for the Natural History Museum in San Diego in 1974, and an amphitheater for Country Day School in La Jolla, California.

After his wife's death in 1980, Goodell resumed painting, and between 1993 and 1997 produced a series of life paintings in oil and a final self-portrait.

== Crafts ==
Goodell was an accomplished carpenter, furniture maker and metalworker in both iron and pewter, skills in tune with the Quaker tradition of pursuing the practical arts. He supported himself at art school by repairing and reproducing antique furniture. Always oriented towards the craft aspects of art, he made many of the frames for his large oil paintings, possibly influenced by renowned Bucks County framemaker Ben Badura, who framed at least two of Goodell's works.

In 1932 Goodell embarked on renovating 5269 Germantown Avenue, undertaking all rebuilding, carpentry, cabinetry and furnishing in return for studio and living space. In 1933 he directed the building of a forge at Germantown Friends School.

== Teaching ==
Throughout his life, Goodell's art career was pursued concurrently with his academic and teaching careers. From 1933 to 1942 he taught art and crafts (including wrought iron and metal spinning) at the Germantown Friends School in Philadelphia. After WWII he joined the faculty of the Moore Institute of Art, Science, and Industry, teaching drawing, painting and composition (1946–1951). From 1960 to 1983 he taught art and drama at La Jolla Country Day School in La Jolla, Calif., retiring at age 75.

While Goodell was not active in the Quaker church, there was much about his work and life that was lived in tune with the Quaker aesthetic that encompassed "depth, authenticity, and connectedness to nature and community."

== Bibliography ==
- Crane, Aimee, ed., Art in the Armed Forces, The Hyperion Press, Charles Scribner's Sons, 1944
- Hughes, Edan, Artists in California, 1786–1940, Crocker Art Museum; 3rd edition, November 2002. ISBN 1-884038-08-5
- Who’s Who in American Art, Vol. IV, 1947, American Federation of Arts, R.R. Bowker, Washington, D.C.
- Williams, Reba and Dave, American Screenprints, catalog, National Academy of Design, New York, 1987
- Centybear, Tara; Dijkstra, Bram; Thwaites, Lyn, ″William Newport Goodell, Painter, Craftsman, Teacher″, exhibition catalog, La Jolla Historical Society, 2015

== Periodicals ==
- Art Digest, April 1, 1933, p. 9, First Hallgarten Prize
- Art Digest, September 1, 1942, “Buys the Best,” Woodmere Art Gallery acquires Goodell's Jimmie Reading
- Art in Focus, Vol. 2, No. 6, March 1951, Womb of Creation exhibited at the Pennsylvania Academy of the Fine Art's 146th annual, followed by a large Regional Exhibition of Painting and Sculpture sponsored by PAFA, the PAFA Fellowship and the Philadelphia Chapter of Artists Equity Assn.
