= Edwin Jellett =

American engineer, botanist, gardener, photographer, artist & diarist (1860-1929)

Edwin Costley Jellett
- Born: November 22, 1860
- Died: March 8, 1929 (aged 68)
- Writing career
- Language: Engineer; botanist; gardner; photographer; artist; diarist
- Genre: Non-fiction
- Subject: Germantown, Philadelphia, Pennsylvania

Edwin Costley Jellett (November 22, 1860 – March 8, 1929) was an American engineer, botanist, gardener, photographer, artist, and diarist who wrote books and articles about Germantown, Philadelphia, Pennsylvania and its flora.

== Biography ==
His writing covers Germantown's historic homes, natural environment, gardens, and prominent residents. He was active in the Germantown Horticultural Society and in the Germantown Historical Society. A collection of his papers is held by the University of Pennsylvania, Historical Society of Pennsylvania, and La Salle University.

Jewett wrote a series of weekly articles titled A Flora of Germantown that was published in Germantown's The Independent Gazette newspaper every Friday for almost forty weeks in 1903, which covered plants, flowers, and local history noted from his wanderings in Northwest Philadelphia (Germantown). The Awbury Arboretum republished the articles online in celebration of its centennial in 2016. Each week's entry ended with a list of the plants that had been noted including the common and Latin name.

He worked as a draughtsman.

Jellett traveled by trolley and train to visit various regional destinations.

Jellett was an officer of the Mermaid Club for many years and served as the group's president for several.

== Bibliography ==
- Germantown, Old and New: Its Rare and Notable Plants, 1904
- Germantown Gardens and Gardeners
- Personal Recollections of William Kite, 1901 (about the librarian)
- The Mermaid of the Past, 1892
- Ferns of Germantown, 1896
- The Mermaid Club, its Past and Future, 1897
- Winter Flora of Germantown, 1901
- German-Towne: Its Founders and Their Progenitors, and What We Owe Them, 1903
- A Flora of Germantown, with Notes of Nature and Nature Lovers, 1903
