= Mary Davis Ridgway =

American physician (1873–1927)

- Born: 1873; Ithaca, New York, U.S.
- Died: February 4, 1927; Philadelphia, U.S.
- Occupations: Physician, surgeon

Mary Davis Ridgway (November 23, 1873 – February 4, 1927) was an American homeopathic physician, surgeon, and women's rights advocate. She was president and chief surgeon of the Providence General Hospital, a small hospital that practiced homeopathy for mostly impoverished female patients in Germantown, Philadelphia.

== Life and career ==
Ridgway was born in 1873 in Ithaca, New York, and graduated from the Cleveland Homeopathic Medical College in Ohio in 1898. After practicing medicine in Ohio, she moved to Philadelphia in 1912 or 1915.

On arriving in Philadelphia, Ridgway became president and chief surgeon of the Providence General Homeopathic Hospital, a 25-bed public hospital located on Queens Street in Germantown. Nearly all of the hospital's officers and medical staff were women, with Antoinette E. C. Russell serving as first vice president and associate surgeon. The hospital operated from the Abraham Rittenhouse Home from 1914 to 1917. According to the Pennsylvania Historical and Museum Commission (PHMC), "political pressure then forced the hospital to move from this site, and it closed shortly after Dr. Ridgway's death." The hospital was part of the Florence Crittenton Mission, founded in 1894 to provide "aid and protection to girls and women in any walk of life who may be in distress." In September 2001, the PHMC dedicated a commemorative marker to Ridgway near the former hospital's location.

Ridgway presented at state medical conferences and published proceedings papers, including "Preparatory and After Care of Surgical Cases" (presented at the State Medical Society of Pennsylvania, September 1911) and "Preventive Gynecology" (published in the Hahnemannian Monthly, 1911).

Later in life, Ridgway managed and held stock in the Tourist Hotel and Garage in Reading, Pennsylvania. Remarkably, the corporation that owned the hotel was under female management. However, Ridgway came into conflict with the other investors, who eventually forced her out. Litigation ensued, the hotel went into receivership, and a district court judge authorized the hotel to be sold for $185,000 plus $125,000 in bonds distributed to stockholders in 1924.

Ridgway died in Philadelphia on February 4, 1927, at the age of 53 after an illness of several months. Interment took place in her hometown of Ithaca.

She was a member of the Pennsylvania Homeopathic Medical Society.
