= William C. Sharpless House =

Historic house in Pennsylvania, United States

- U.S. National Register of Historic Places
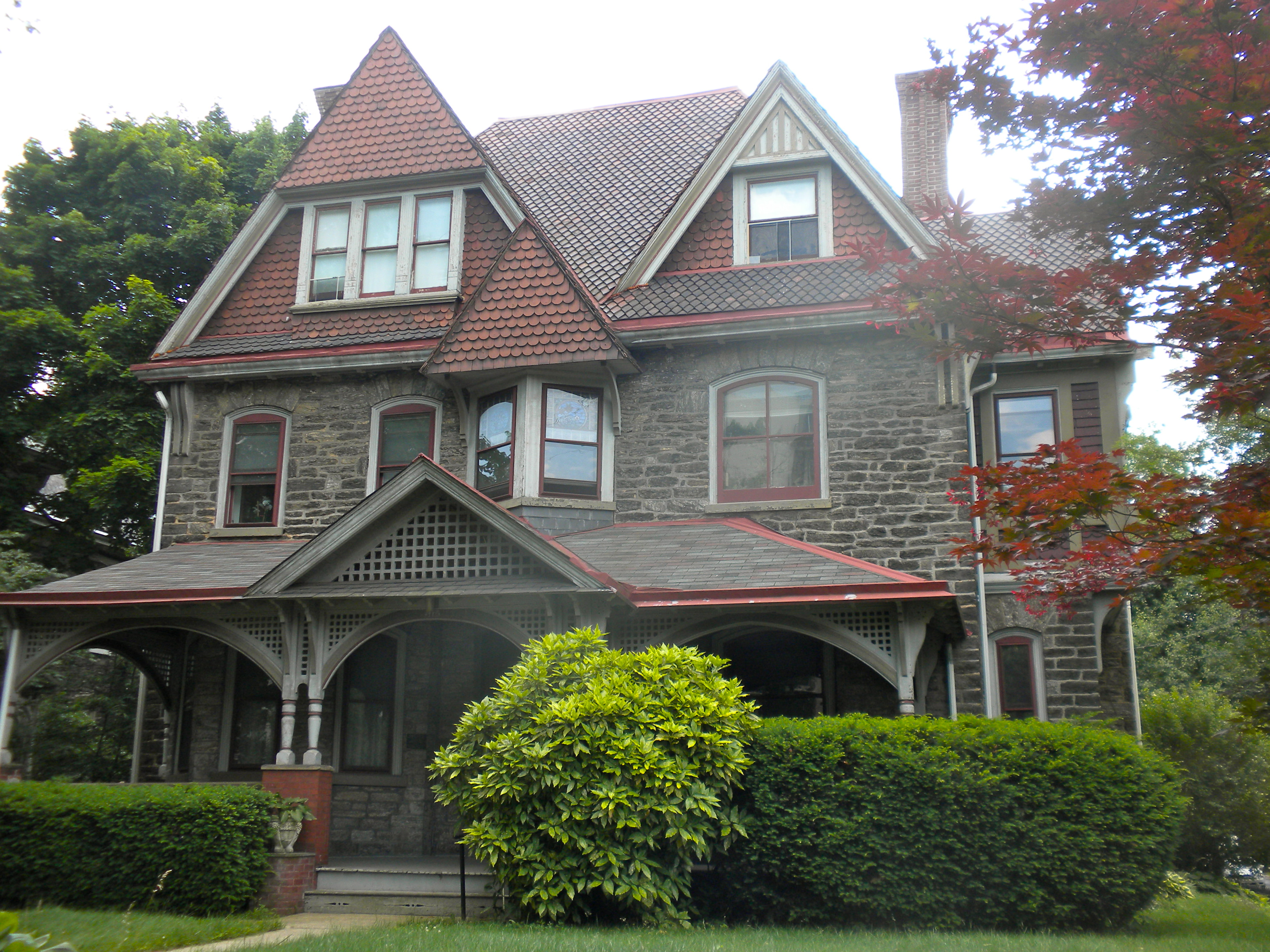
- William C. Sharpless House, June 2010

- Location within Philadelphia Location within Pennsylvania Location within the United States
- Location: 5446 Wayne Ave., Philadelphia, Pennsylvania
- Coordinates: 40°1′48″N 75°10′37″W
- Area: 0.3 acres (0.12 ha)
- Built: c. 1886
- Architect: Hewitt, G.W.
- Architectural style: Queen Anne
- NRHP reference No.: 83004249
- Added to NRHP: December 29, 1983

The William C. Sharpless House is an historic home that is located in the Germantown neighborhood of Philadelphia, Pennsylvania, United States.

It was added to the National Register of Historic Places in 1983.

== History and architectural features ==
Built circa 1886, this historic structure is a three-story, Wissahickon schist, clapboard, and shingle dwelling that was designed in the Queen Anne style. It features decorative quoining, gable, and hipped rooflines, and terra cotta decorative details. A two-story addition was built during the early 1900s. Also located on the property is a contributing brick stable with stone quoining.
