= Thomas Meehan School =

- U.S. National Register of Historic Places
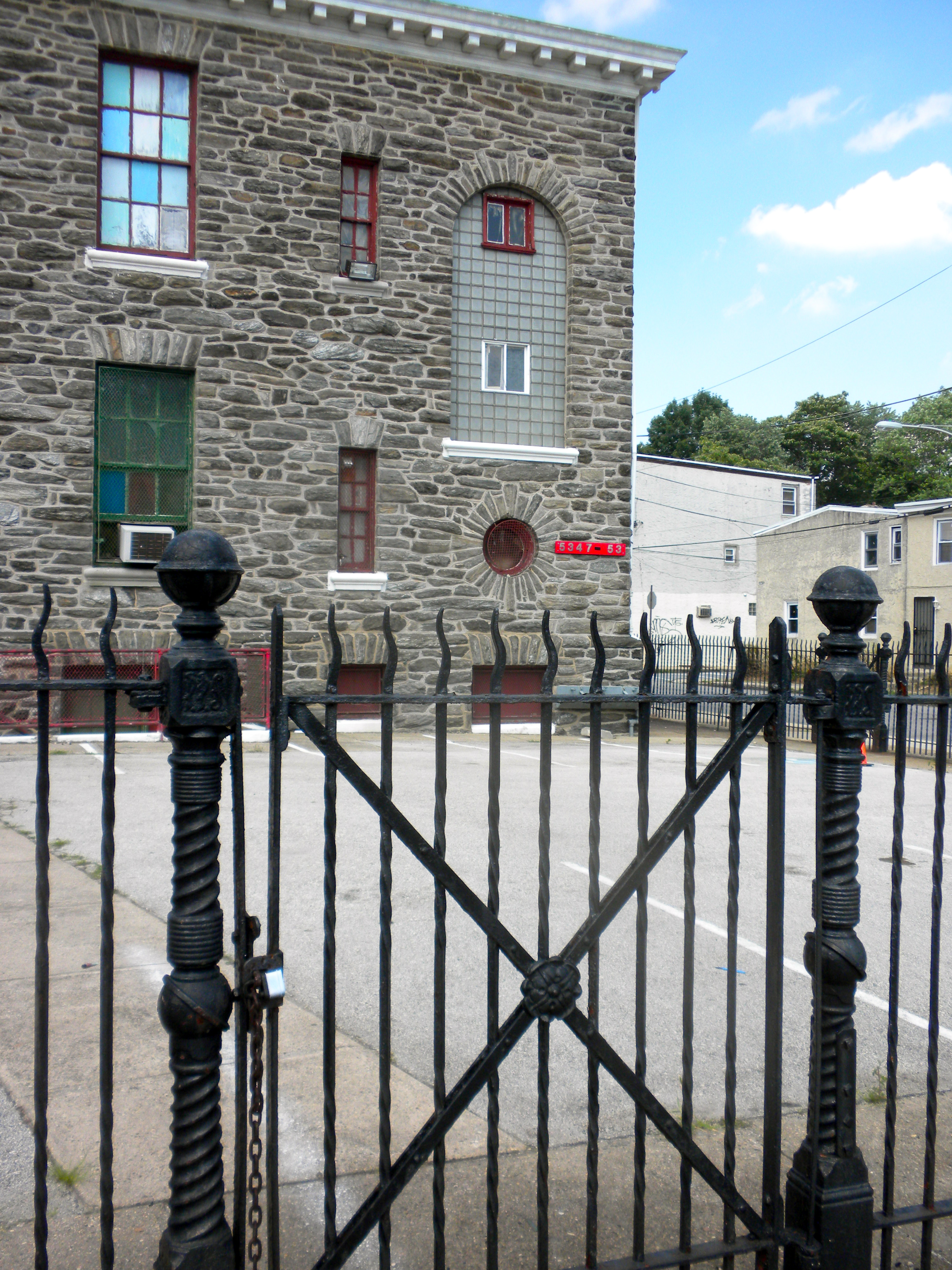
- Thomas Meehan School, June 2010

- Location within Philadelphia Location within Pennsylvania Location within the United States
- Location: 5347 Pulaski Ave., Philadelphia, Pennsylvania, United States
- Coordinates: 40°1′39″N 75°10′33″W
- Area: 1 acre (0.40 ha)
- Built: 1901–1902
- Built by: Harry Kuemmerle
- Architect: Lloyd Titus
- Architectural style: Colonial Revival
- MPS: Philadelphia Public Schools TR
- NRHP reference No.: 88002312
- Added to NRHP: November 18, 1988

The Thomas Meehan School is a historic former school building that is located in the Germantown neighborhood of Philadelphia, Pennsylvania, United States.

The building was added to the National Register of Historic Places in 1988.

== History and architectural features ==
Built between 1901 and 1902, this historic structure is a two-story, five-bay, stone building that was designed in the Colonial Revival style. It features a portico with Doric order columns, arched openings, and a modillioned cornice and was used for industrial purposes during the mid-twentieth century. It is now home to the Pentecostal Faith Assembly Church.
