= Delmar Apartments =

- U.S. National Register of Historic Places
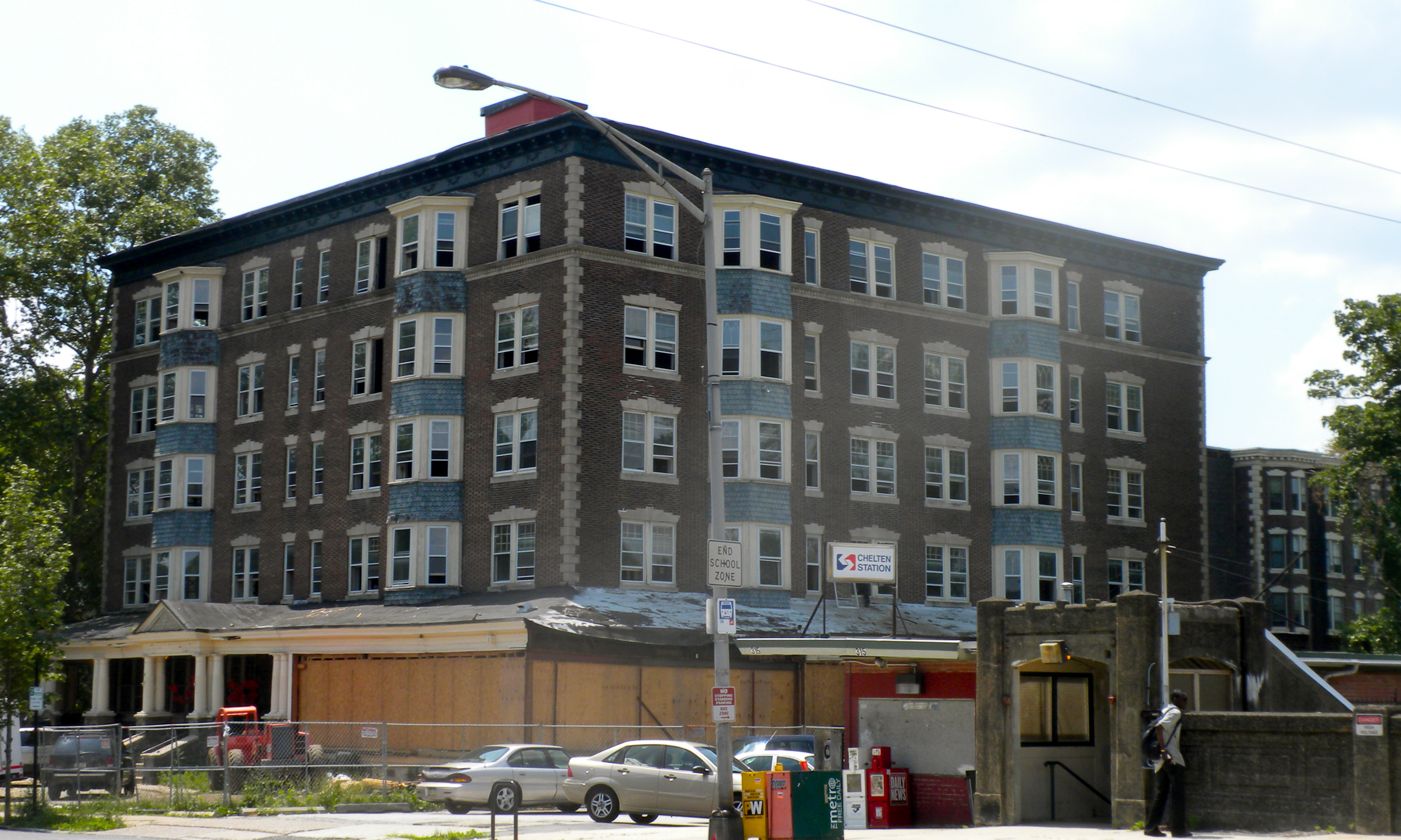
- Delmar Apartments

- Location within Philadelphia Location within Pennsylvania Location within the United States
- Location: 319 W. Chelten Ave., Philadelphia, Pennsylvania
- Coordinates: 40°1′46″N 75°10′54″W
- Area: less than one acre
- Built: 1902
- Architect: Fox, Frederick
- Architectural style: Colonial Revival
- NRHP reference No.: 82001545
- Added to NRHP: November 14, 1982

Delmar Apartments, also known as Chelten Station, is a historic apartment building located in the Germantown neighborhood of Philadelphia, Pennsylvania. It was built in 1902, and is a five-story, U-shaped brick building in the Colonial Revival-style. The first floor is faced in Wissahickon schist and has a wood porch. It features four-story bay windows, a terra cotta cornice, and pediment above the main entrance. It was the first large apartment building built in the Germantown-Chestnut Hill area.

It was added to the National Register of Historic Places in 1982.
