= Edwin Fitler Academics Plus School =

- Fitler School
- U.S. National Register of Historic Places
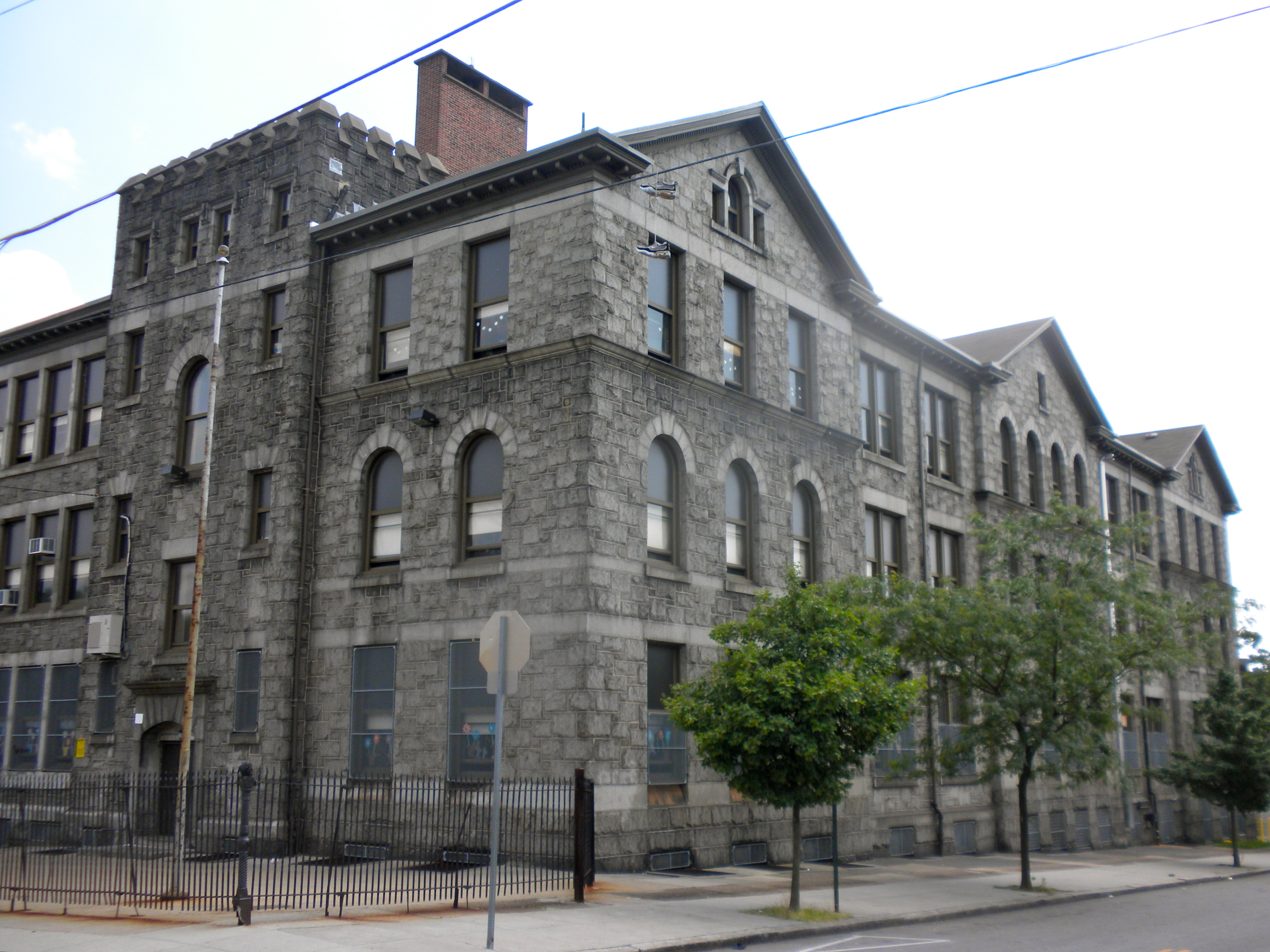
- Fitler School, June 2010

- Location within Philadelphia Location within Pennsylvania Location within the United States
- Location: 140 West Seymour Street, Philadelphia, Pennsylvania
- Coordinates: 40°01′34″N 75°09′59″W
- Area: 1 acre (0.40 ha)
- Built: 1897–1898
- Built by: S. Gourley, Jr.
- Architect: Louis Anshutz
- Architectural style: Gothic
- MPS: Philadelphia Public Schools TR
- NRHP reference No.: 86003281
- Added to NRHP: December 4, 1986

Edwin Fitler Academics Plus School is a historic school located in the Germantown neighborhood of Philadelphia, Pennsylvania. It is part of the School District of Philadelphia. The building was built in 1897–1898 and is a 3 1/2-story, schist building in the Gothic-style. It features a projecting battlement tower, round arched openings, and three projecting gables.

The building was added to the National Register of Historic Places in 1986.
