= Mayfair House =

- U.S. National Register of Historic Places
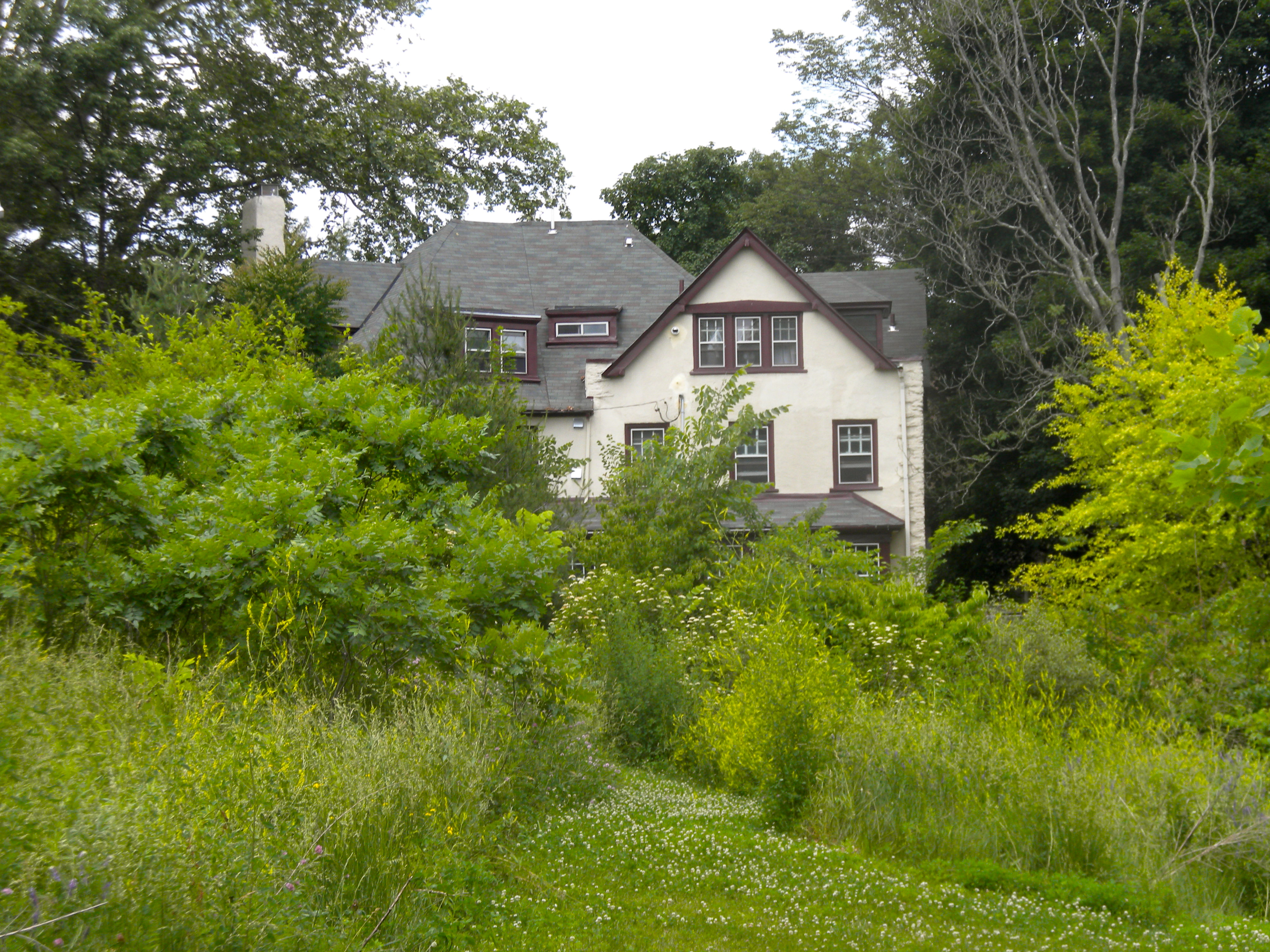
- Empty lot with Connie Mack's house behind it

- Location within Philadelphia Location within Pennsylvania Location within the United States
- Location: 401 W. Johnson St., Philadelphia
- Coordinates: 40°2′14″N 75°11′30″W
- Area: 1 acre (0.40 ha)
- Built: 1925
- Architect: Sugarman & Berger
- Architectural style: Regency Revival
- NRHP reference No.: 82003811
- Added to NRHP: April 07, 1982

The Mayfair House was a historic 14 story apartment building completed in 1925 and located at 401 West Johnson Street in the West Mount Airy neighborhood of Philadelphia, Pennsylvania, on Lincoln Drive between Johnson and Cliveden Streets. It was considered "one of the city's most original and distinctive landmarks, a major architectural work."

It may be considered part of a set of three apartment buildings in the area, the others being the Alden Park Manor and McCallum Manor which offered a type of modern city living in the early 20th century in a suburban, even rustic, setting. The Regency architecture also offered "ethnic continuity" to Philadelphia's anglophile culture.

The building has been destroyed and 401 West Johnson Street is now an empty lot.
