= Mennonite Meetinghouse =

Historic church in Pennsylvania, United States

- U.S. National Register of Historic Places
- U.S. National Historic Landmark District – Contributing property
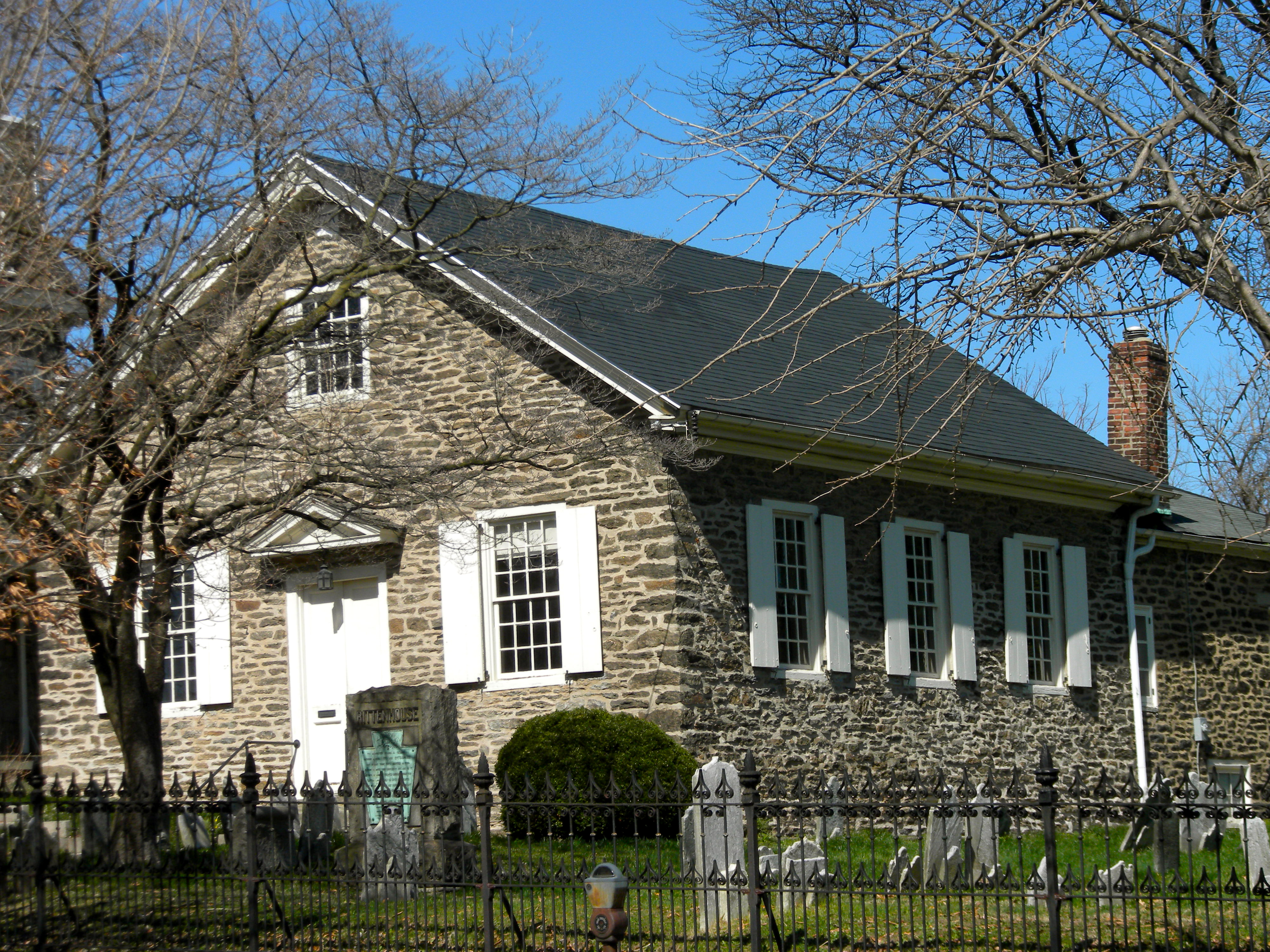

- Location within Philadelphia Location within Pennsylvania Location within the United States
- Location: 6119 Germantown Ave., Philadelphia, Pennsylvania
- Coordinates: 40°2′28″N 75°10′46″W
- Area: less than one acre
- Built: 1770
- NRHP reference No.: 73001663
- Added to NRHP: July 23, 1973

The Mennonite Meetinghouse (Germantown Mennonite Church) is an historic Mennonite church building that is located at 6119 Germantown Avenue in Philadelphia, Pennsylvania, United States.

It was added to the National Register of Historic Places in 1973.

== History and architectural features ==
The first settlers in Germantown in 1683 were Dutch and Germans recruited by William Penn. Most of the settlers had a Mennonite background but joined the Quaker meeting. Sometime around 1690, several families attended non-Quaker services; the subsequently built a log church in 1708. This church was the first Mennonite Church in America. William Rittenhouse was its first minister. The log church was replaced by the present church at the same site in 1770; the replacement was built by Jacob Knorr.

== Trust ==
The Germantown Mennonite Historic Trust (GMHT) has EIN 23-1884284 as a 501(c)(3) Public Charity.

GMHT is distinct from the Congregation of Germantown Mennonite Church, a 501(c)(3) Public Charity with EIN 23-1381382.
