= Alden Park Manor =

- U.S. National Register of Historic Places
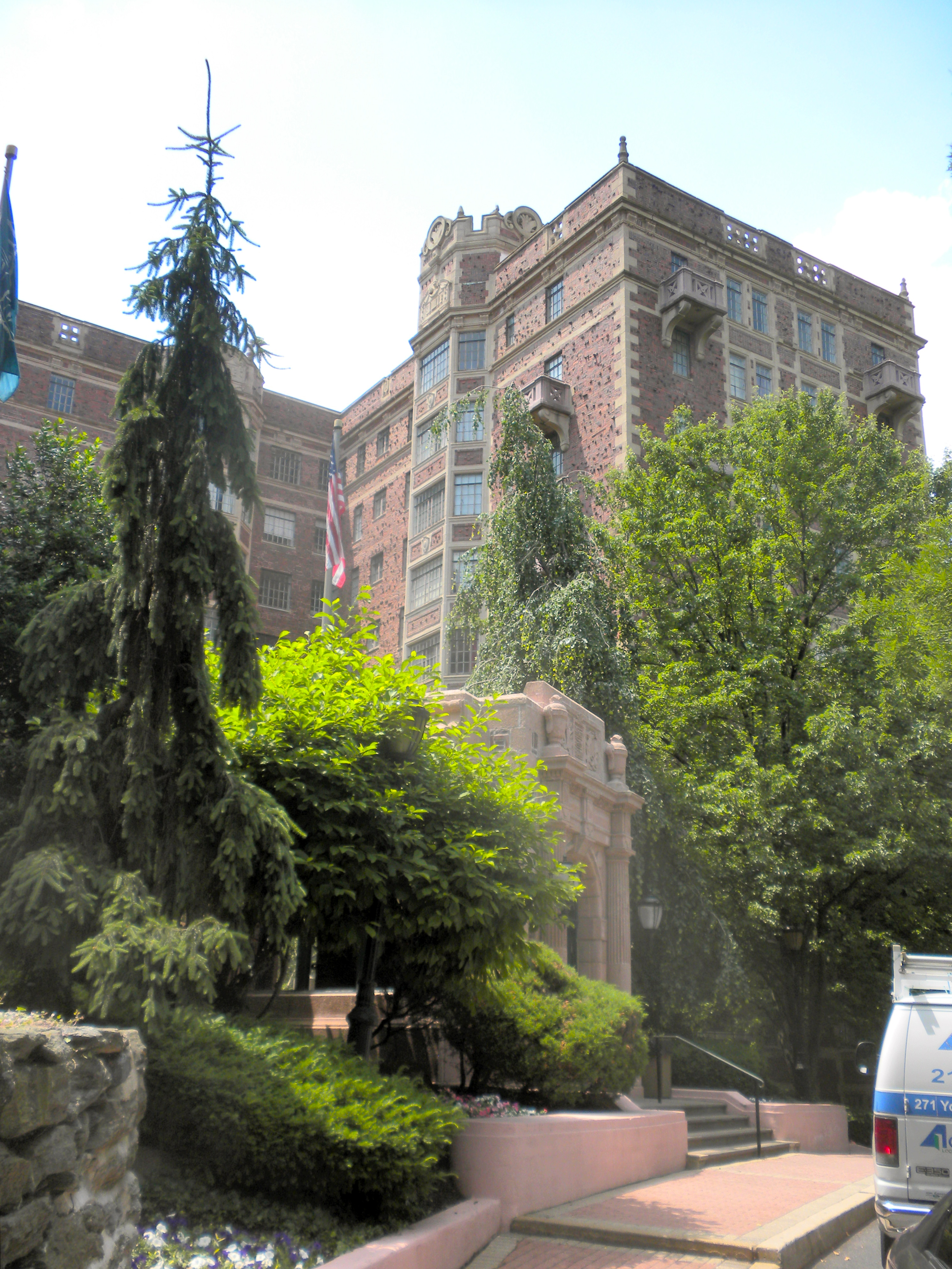
- Main entrance

- Location within Philadelphia Location within Pennsylvania Location within the United States
- Location: 5500 Wissahickon Ave., Philadelphia, Pennsylvania
- Coordinates: 40°1′34″N 75°11′10″W
- Area: 38 acres (15 ha)
- Built: 1925
- Architect: Edwin Rorke
- Architectural style: Jacobean Revival
- NRHP reference No.: 80003606
- Added to NRHP: August 15, 1980

Alden Park Manor is a living community located in the Germantown neighborhood of Philadelphia, Pennsylvania in the United States.

== History ==
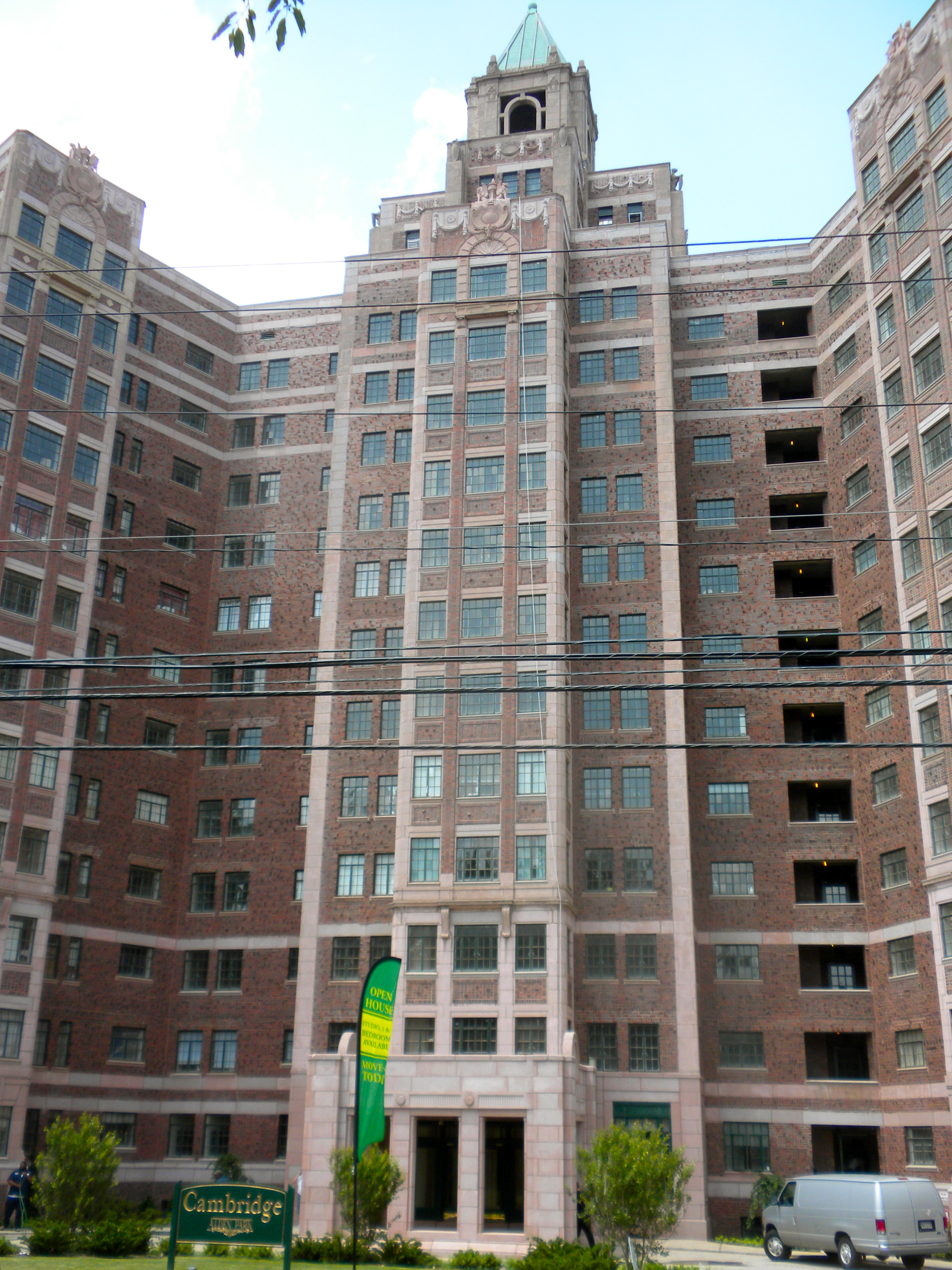
Cambridge building

Built in the Jacobean Revival style, Alden Park Manor was founded and built in 1926. The complex has three sets of towers - the Manor, Kenilworth, and Cambridge buildings. Designed by Edwin Rorke and developed by Lawrence Jones, it was built in a park-like setting on thirty-eight acres that had been the Justus C. Strawbridge estate. It was the first co-operative apartment complex in Philadelphia, although it now operates only as rentals.

The complex overlooks the Wissahickon Valley section of Fairmount Park in the city's Germantown section. The buildings are surrounded by lawns and gardens, a rarity in the fairly urban setting. The complex features a unique indoor swimming pool which is lined with Mercer tiles and has a retractable roof. Alden Park was listed on the National Register of Historic Places in 1980 and on the Philadelphia Register of Historic Places in 1981. In the fall of 2015, a private firm bought the property for $59 million and began restorations.
