= Concord School House (Philadelphia) =

- U.S. National Historic Landmark District – Contributing property
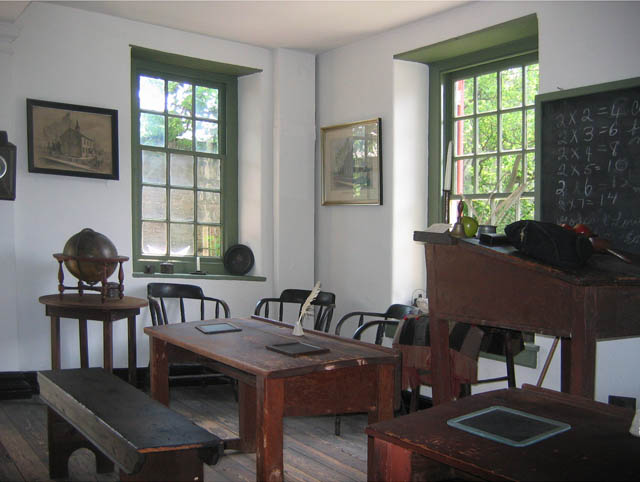

- Location within Pennsylvania Location within the United States
- Location: 6309 Germantown Ave. Philadelphia, Pennsylvania
- Coordinates: 40.0437°N 75.1810°W
- Built: 1775
- Architectural style: Colonial

The Concord School House is a historic one-room schoolhouse in the Germantown section of Philadelphia, Pennsylvania. It is operated today as a museum. It is part of the Colonial Germantown Historic District which was named a National Historic Landmark District in 1965.

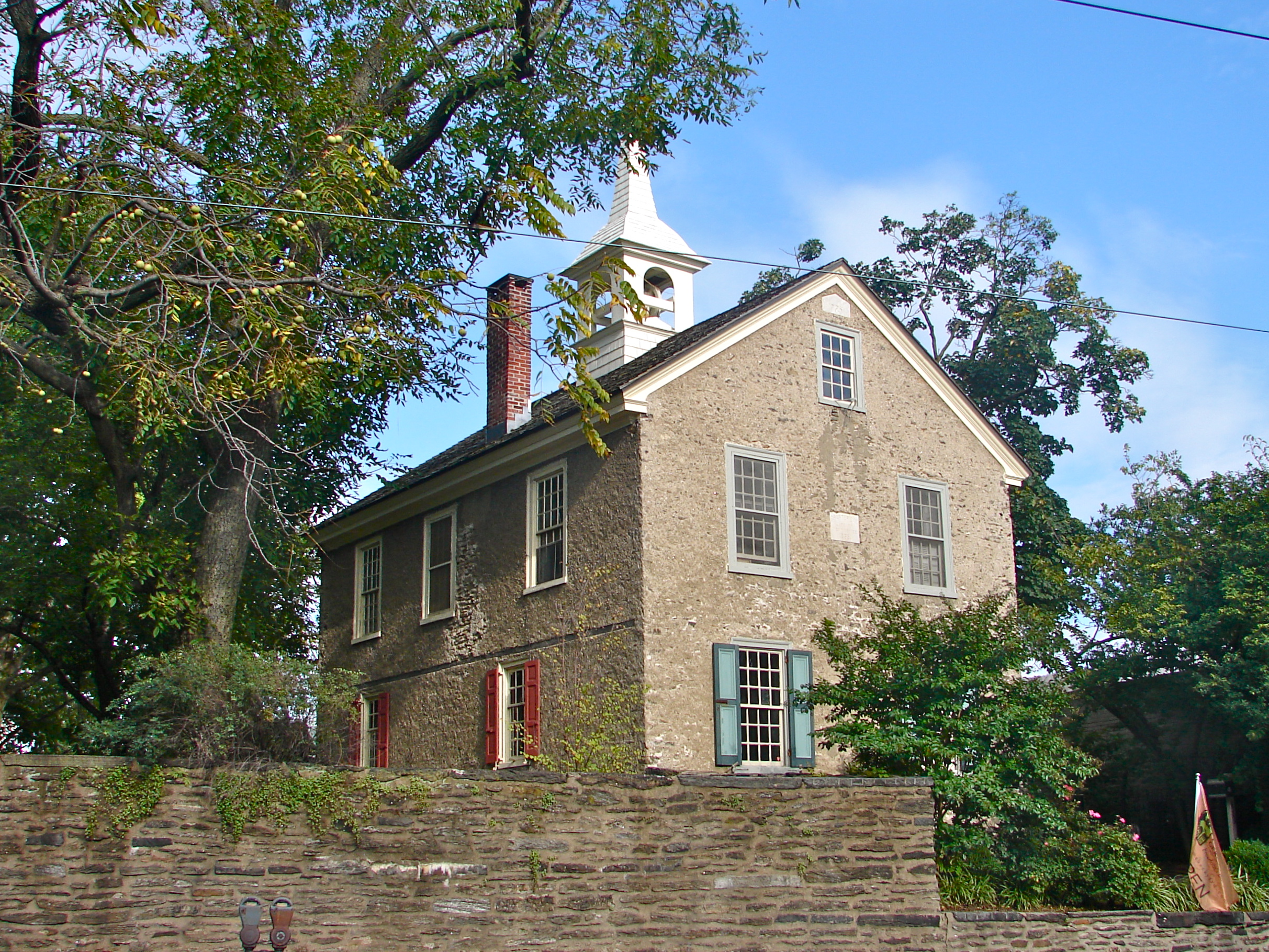
View from northwest

Built in 1775 by Jacob Knorr (or Knor), Concord was the first English-language school in Germantown, which was then a separate town about six miles northwest of Philadelphia. It is built on the corner of the Upper Burial Ground at Washington Lane and Germantown Avenue. It opened to students in October 1775, and served as a school room until at least 1889.

== Architecture ==
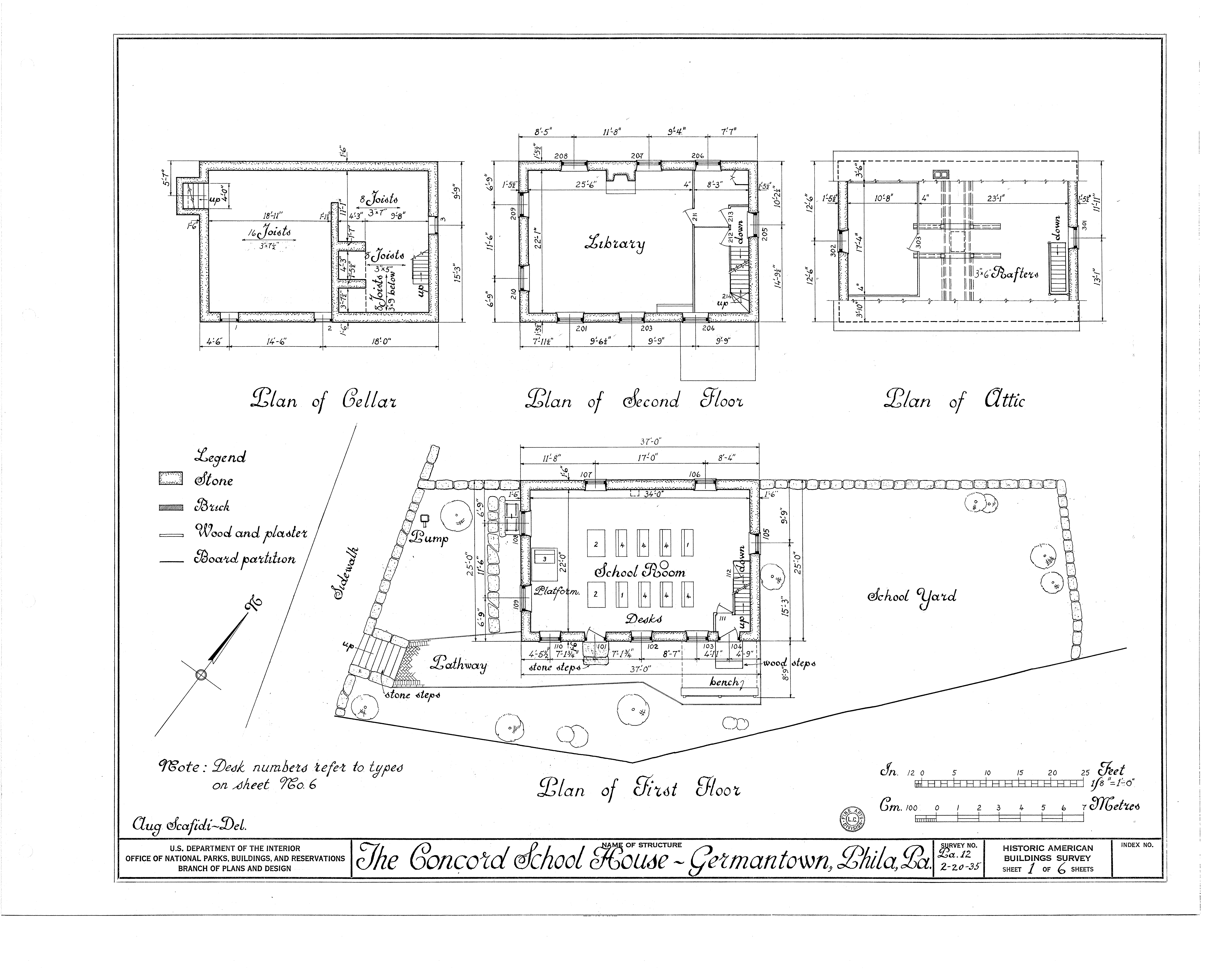
Site plan from the Historic American Buildings Survey

The school is 25 by 37 feet (7.6 by 11.3 m), two bays by three bays, and was originally one story with a cellar. In 1818 a second floor was added as a town meeting room which was long used as a library. A square open belfry with a spire tops the roof. The walls are made of rough random rubble which was once stuccoed. Both entrance doors are on the south side of the building. The cellar is accessed from two stairways, one from the outside in front of the school, and the other from the back of the classroom.

The teacher stood on a raised platform on the west side of the classroom. The building retains its original bell and belfry, schoolmaster's desk, books, and even a stool and dunce cap.

The schoolhouse sits on a raised lot about 5 feet (1.5 m) above and about 20 feet (6.1 m) east of Germantown Avenue. Seven stairs ascend from the street leading to the school which is on the same level as the Upper Burial Ground. A short retaining wall on Germantown Avenue, may have been built in 1777, when the much taller wall around the Upper Burial Ground was built.

Knorr, a master builder, is buried in the burial ground. He also constructed the John Johnson House across the street, Cliveden, and the original Germantown Academy.

== History ==
At a meeting on March 24, 1775, the residents of the upper part of Germantown decided that the Union School was too far for their children to travel, and they needed a schoolhouse of their own. The Union School was perhaps the largest non-religious building in Germantown at the time. German was its main language of instruction. It was later known as the Germantown Academy and is located one mile south of the Concord School House. Other nearby schools were single rooms, including the Harmony School in Chestnut Hill and the Lutheran School, both founded in 1745.

Instruction in Germantown schools at this period was not based on religion but concentrated more on reading, writing, spelling, and arithmetic. Students generally attended the closest school. Schools were not seen as competitors, for example 14 trustees of the Union School donated to the Concord School, and the two schools shared two building managers. About 17% of the Concord Schools students were Dunkards, who are believed to have enrolled only because so many Dunkards lived in the immediate area.

The school's record book covers the founding through the early twentieth century and is held by the Historical Society of Pennsylvania. It lists 122 original subscribers.

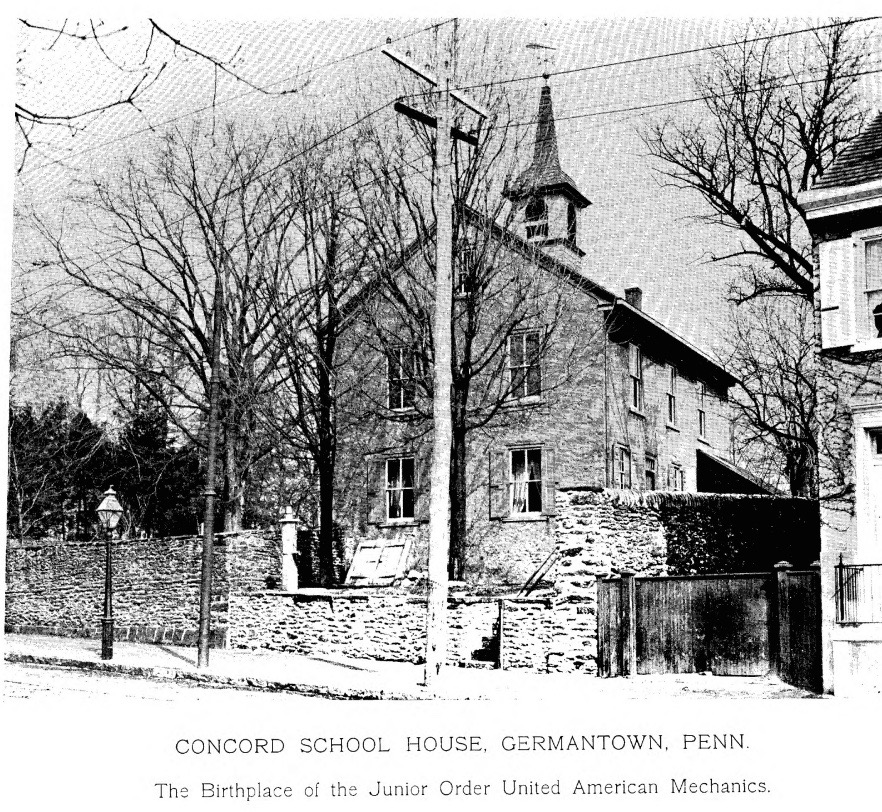
Concord Schoolhouse c.1897

Samuel Fitch Hochkin quotes the record of the first meeting extensively. Jacob Engle, Peter Keyser, Peter Leibert, and Jacob Knorr were chosen to be the managers of the building. Knorr "nearly completed" the building in October 1775. The total money subscribed was 245 pounds, 1 shilling, and 2 pence, but the record notes "the Continental that came to nothing 2 pounds. Real amount 243 pounds 1 shilling 2 pence."

The site beside the Upper Burial Ground was chosen, construction began, and in October 1775, the Concord School was nearly completed and opened. John Grimes was the first schoolmaster and instruction was entirely in English.

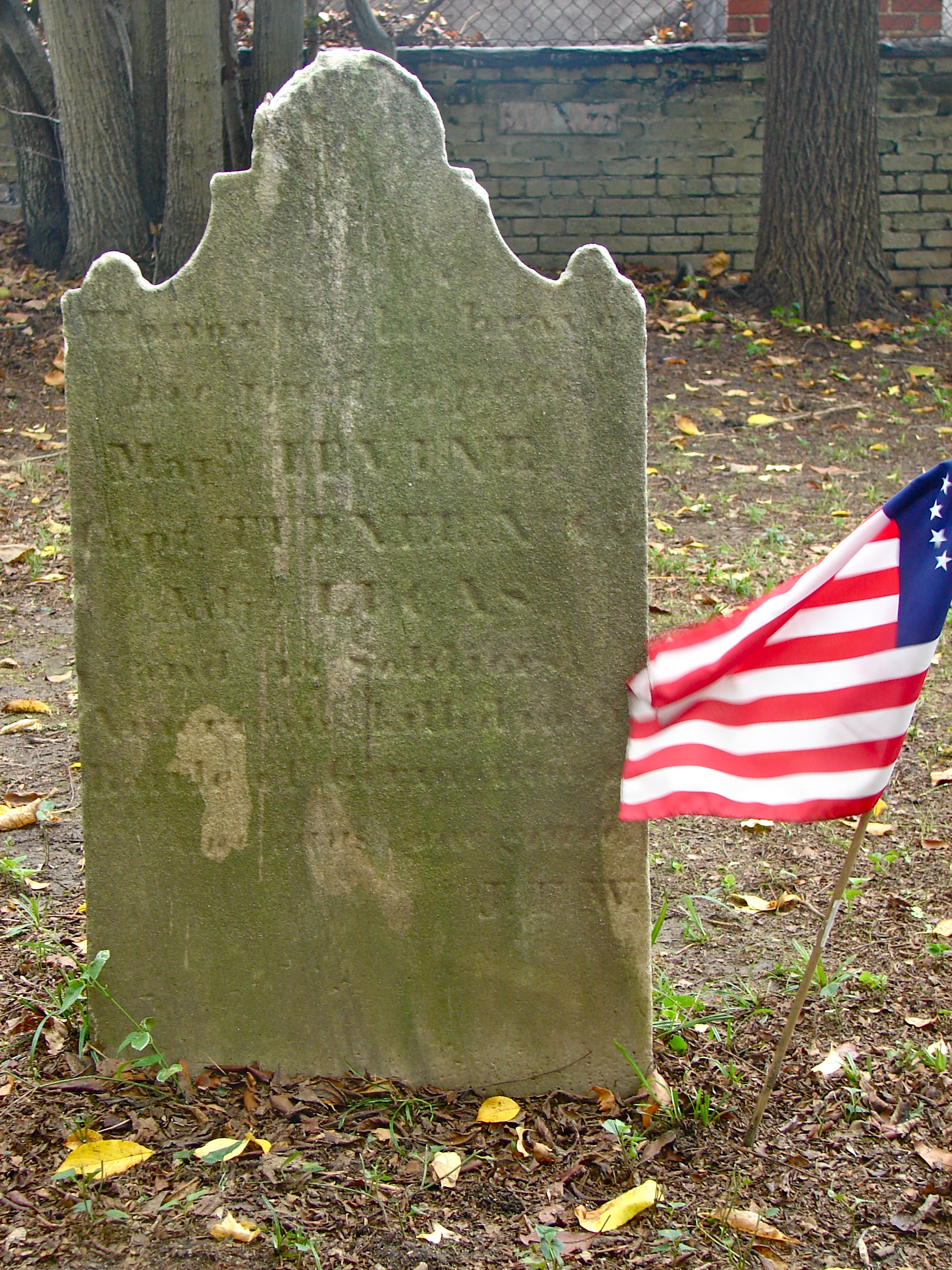
Marker in the Upper Burial Ground, just a few feet north of the school, on the presumed site of the mass grave of 58 American soldiers killed in the Battle of Germantown

On October 4, 1777, the Battle of Germantown was fought outside the school, with a key action fought at Cliveden, just a block north. During the period of the Revolutionary War it is not clear whether the school was open, as no records were kept from 1776 to 1783. The Union School, located further south, was closed during this period.

On April 15, 1783, six trustees were appointed including the four original managers Jacob Engle, Peter Keyser, Peter Leibert, and Jacob Knorr, as well as John Johnson, Jr. and Winard Nice.

The school was supported by subscription and neighbors contributed to the fund, allowing any family that could afford the fee to enroll its children (around $2 per quarter, plus .25 for spelling books), including families of African descent who rented the school house in the 1850s.

When Pennsylvania's public school system was established in 1840, the local township school board rented the building through 1842, marking the end of Concord School's use as an independent school. The building was however, rented out to other schools and social groups after this date.

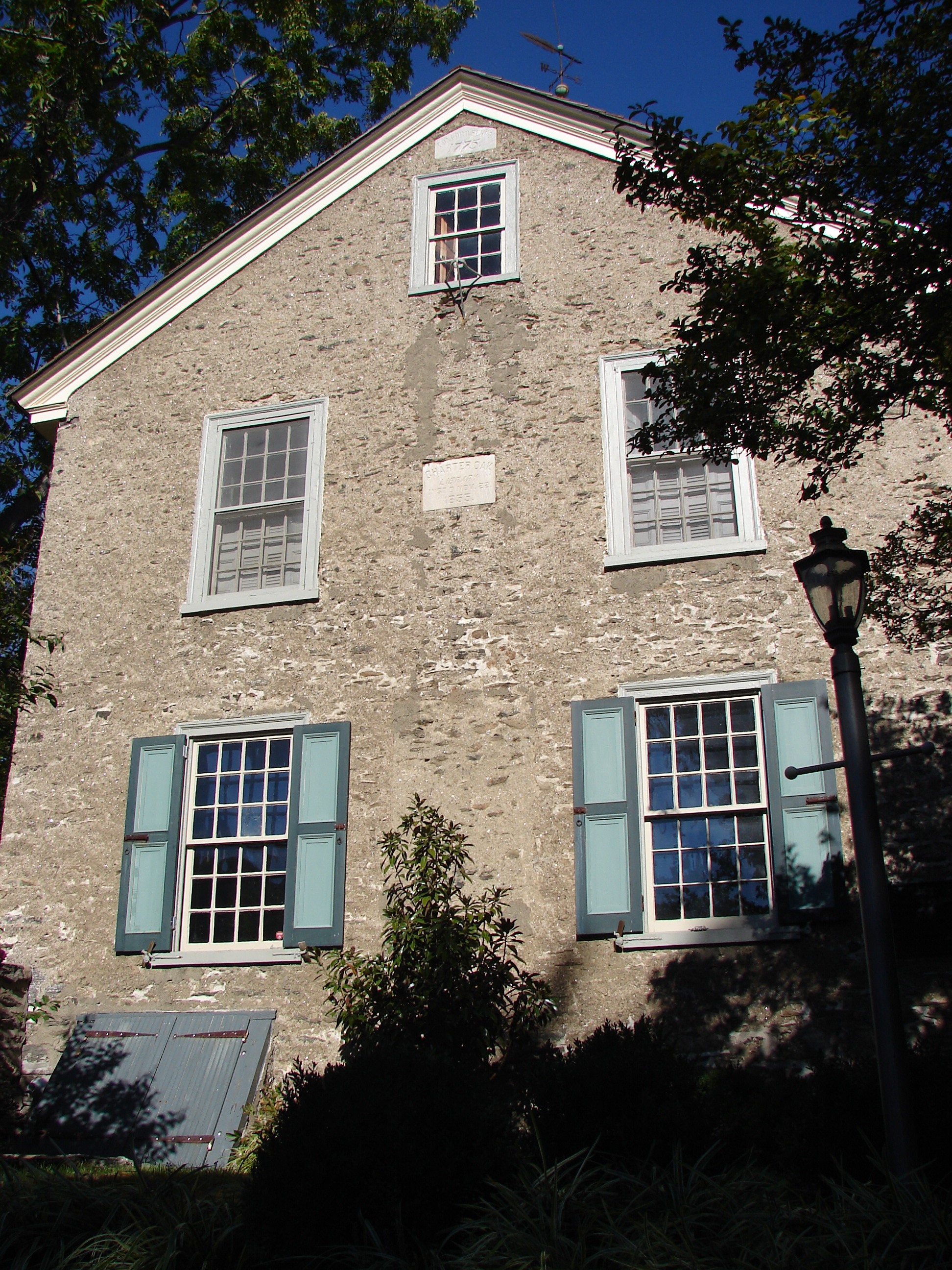
West wall of the school. The datestone at the peak of the gable reads "Concord School, 1775." The stone on the second floor reads "Charter Oak Library, Nov. 22, 1855."

The Hiram Lodge of the Masonic Order rented the upper floor from 1821 to 1823. The Senior Order of United American Mechanics rented the upper floor from 1847 until at least 1853, when the Junior Order was established at the schoolhouse. The Charter Oak Library was established in the upper floor in 1855. The predecessor of the Germantown Historical Society, then known as the Site and Relic Society, used the lower floor as a museum from 1903 to 1908.

In 1889 the first floor housed a private school run by Miss Annie McMurtrie and the room of Mrs. Diilon, the janitor. The Charter Oak Library still occupied the second floor, and did so until at least 1902.

The origin of the school's name is uncertain. It was perhaps named after the ship Concord which brought the first Dutch and German immigrants to America. An alternate theory is that its foundations were built at the time of the first shot of the American Revolution fired in Concord, Massachusetts.

Concord School House is a contributing property of the Colonial Germantown Historic District, which is listed on the National Register of Historic Places and a National Historic Landmark. Several buildings within the district are also separately listed. These include the John Johnson House, across the street, and Cliveden, a block north of the school house, both National Historic Landmarks. The Germantown Mennonite Meetinghouse, Upsala, Michael Billmeyer House and Daniel Billmeyer House, all within three blocks of the school house, are listed on the National Register of Historic Places.
