= Grumblethorpe Tenant House =

Historic house in Pennsylvania, United States

- U.S. National Register of Historic Places
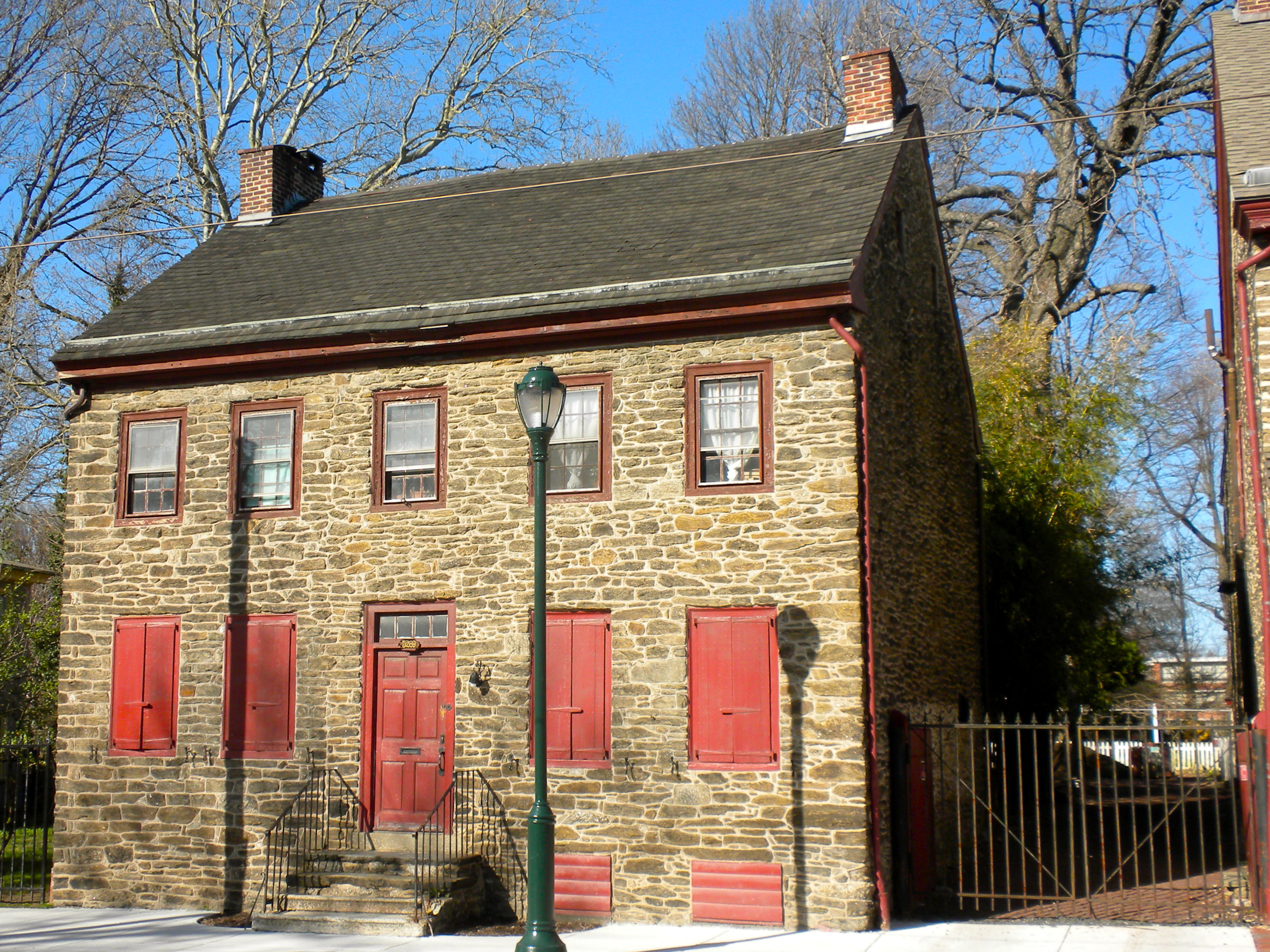
- Grumblethorpe Tenant House, March 2010

- Location within Philadelphia Location within Pennsylvania Location within the United States
- Location: 5269 Germantown Ave., Philadelphia, Pennsylvania
- Coordinates: 40°1′56″N 75°10′8″W
- Area: less than one acre
- Built: c. 1744
- NRHP reference No.: 72001156
- Added to NRHP: June 19, 1972

The Grumblethorpe Tenant House, also known as the Tenant House of Wister's Big House, is an historic home which is located in the Wister neighborhood of Philadelphia, Pennsylvania.

Added to the National Register of Historic Places in 1972, it is a contributing property of the Colonial Germantown Historic District, which has been designated as a National Historic Landmark.

== History and architectural features ==
Built sometime around 1744, this structure was expanded during the early nineteenth century. Now a two-and-one-half-story, thirty-one-square-foot stone dwelling, the original house was a one-story structure that was nineteen feet wide by twenty-eight feet deep that was created as a dependency to John Wister's summer home, Grumblethorpe.

A contributing property of the Colonial Germantown Historic District, which has been designated as a National Historic Landmark, the Grumblethorpe Tenant House was added to the National Register of Historic Places in 1972.
