= Wister, Philadelphia =

Wister
- Neighborhood of Philadelphia
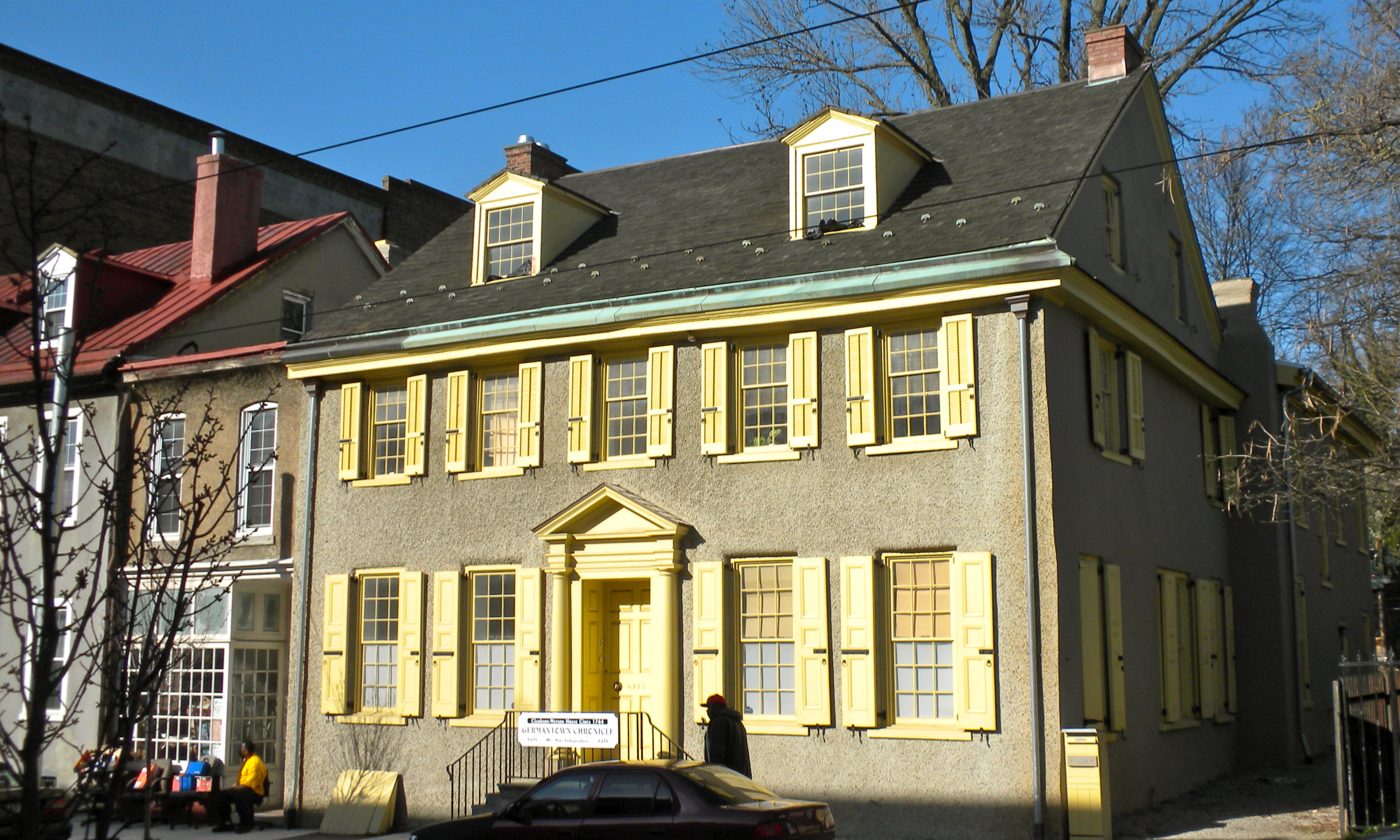
- Clarkson Watson House in Wister, March 2010

- Location within Philadelphia
- Country: United States
- State: Pennsylvania
- County: Philadelphia
- City: Philadelphia
- Area codes: 215, 267, and 445

Wister is a neighborhood in Northwest Philadelphia, Pennsylvania, United States. It is bounded by Chelten Avenue to the north, Germantown Avenue to the west, Belfield Avenue to the east, and Wister Street to the south. Wister is a section within Germantown. The Clarkson-Watson House, Fisher's Lane, Grumblethorpe, Grumblethorpe Tenant House, and Ivy Lodge are listed on the National Register of Historic Places.
