= Clarkson-Watson House =

Historic house in Pennsylvania, United States

- U.S. National Register of Historic Places
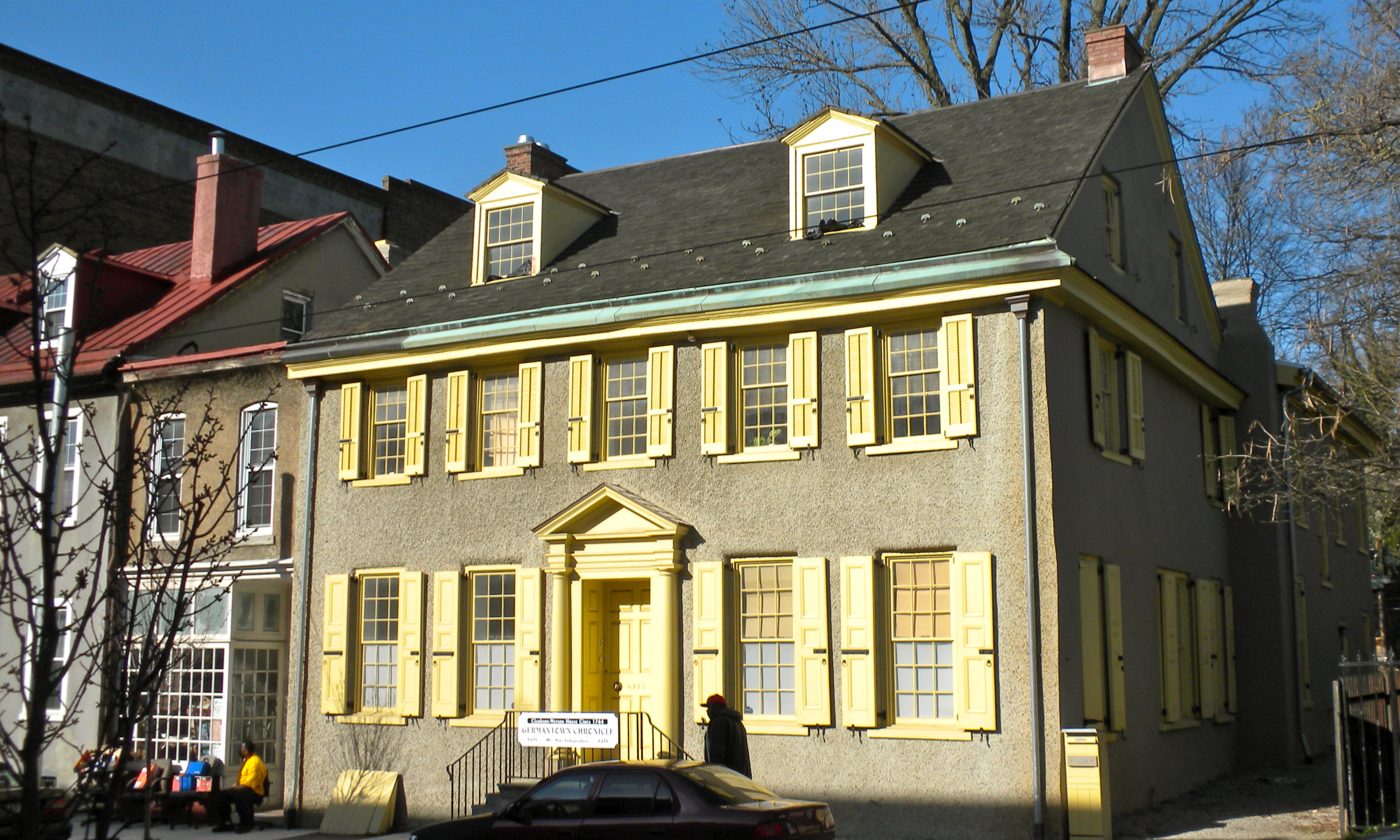
- Clarkson Watson House, March 2010

- Location within Philadelphia Location within Pennsylvania Location within the United States
- Location: 5275-5277 Germantown Ave., Philadelphia, Pennsylvania
- Coordinates: 40°1′56″N 75°10′8″W
- Area: less than one acre
- Built: c. 1745; 281 years ago
- NRHP reference No.: 73001661
- Added to NRHP: April 2, 1973

Clarkson-Watson House, also known as the Bank of Germantown and Germantown Historical Society, is a historic home located in the Wister neighborhood of Philadelphia, Pennsylvania. It was built between 1740 and 1750, and modified in the 1770s. It is a 2 1/2-story, stuccoed stone dwelling with a rear brick addition. It has a gable roof with dormers.

It was added to the National Register of Historic Places in 1973.
