= Fisher's Lane =

Historic house in Pennsylvania, United States

- U.S. National Register of Historic Places
- U.S. Historic district
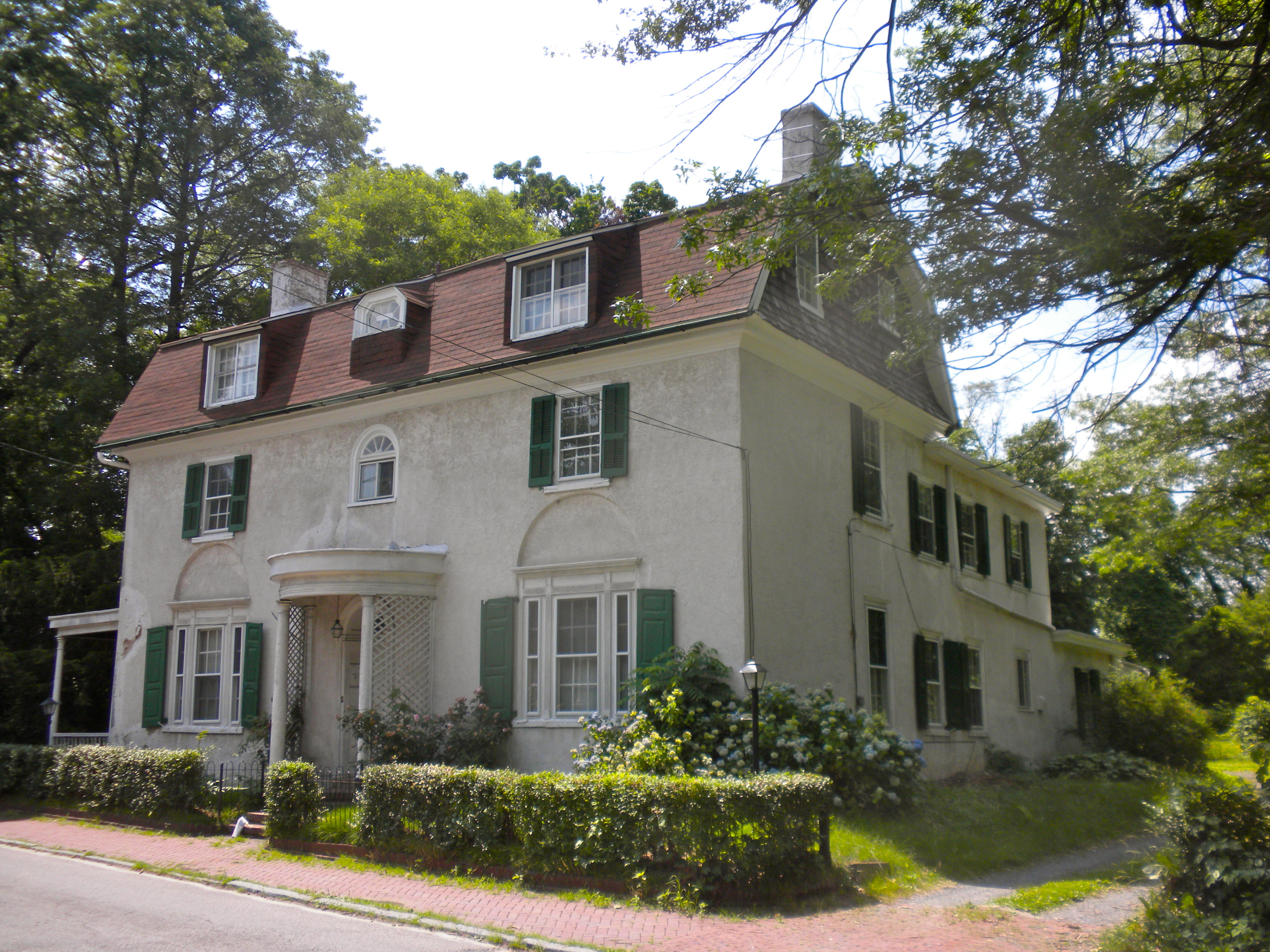
- 39 E. Logan Street in the Fisher's Lane Historic District, June 2010

- Location within Philadelphia Location within Pennsylvania Location within the United States
- Location: E. Logan St., Philadelphia, Pennsylvania
- Coordinates: 40°1′46″N 75°9′40″W
- Area: 5 acres (2.0 ha)
- Architect: Multiple
- Architectural style: Second Empire, Italianate
- NRHP reference No.: 80003611
- Added to NRHP: February 20, 1980

Fisher's Lane is a national historic district located on East Logan Street in the Wister neighborhood of Philadelphia, Pennsylvania, USA. The district includes 12 contributing buildings and three contributing structures in a residential section of Wister. The houses are representative of the Second Empire and Italianate-styles of architecture.

Specific properties include those at numbers 39, 53, 69, 75 and 81 on the northwest side of East Logan Street and 48, 62, 76, 82 and 90–92 on the southeast side. The artist Joseph Pennell lived at 75 East Logan as a teenager. One of his early works depicting "the ugly house across the street" won a prize in a school art show, presented to him by the state.

It was added to the National Register of Historic Places in 1980.
