= Junior Order of United American Mechanics =

American fraternal order

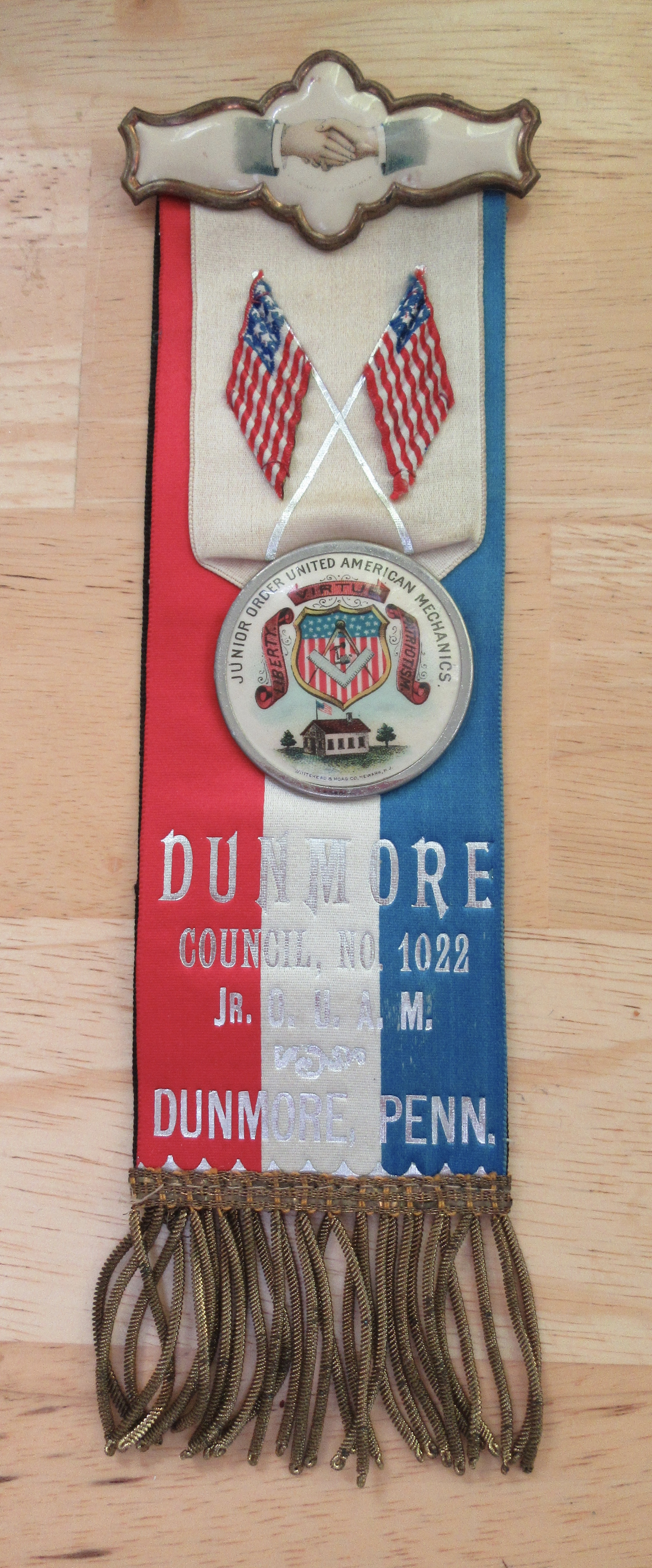
A JOUAM ribbon from Dunmore, Pennsylvania, early 20th century

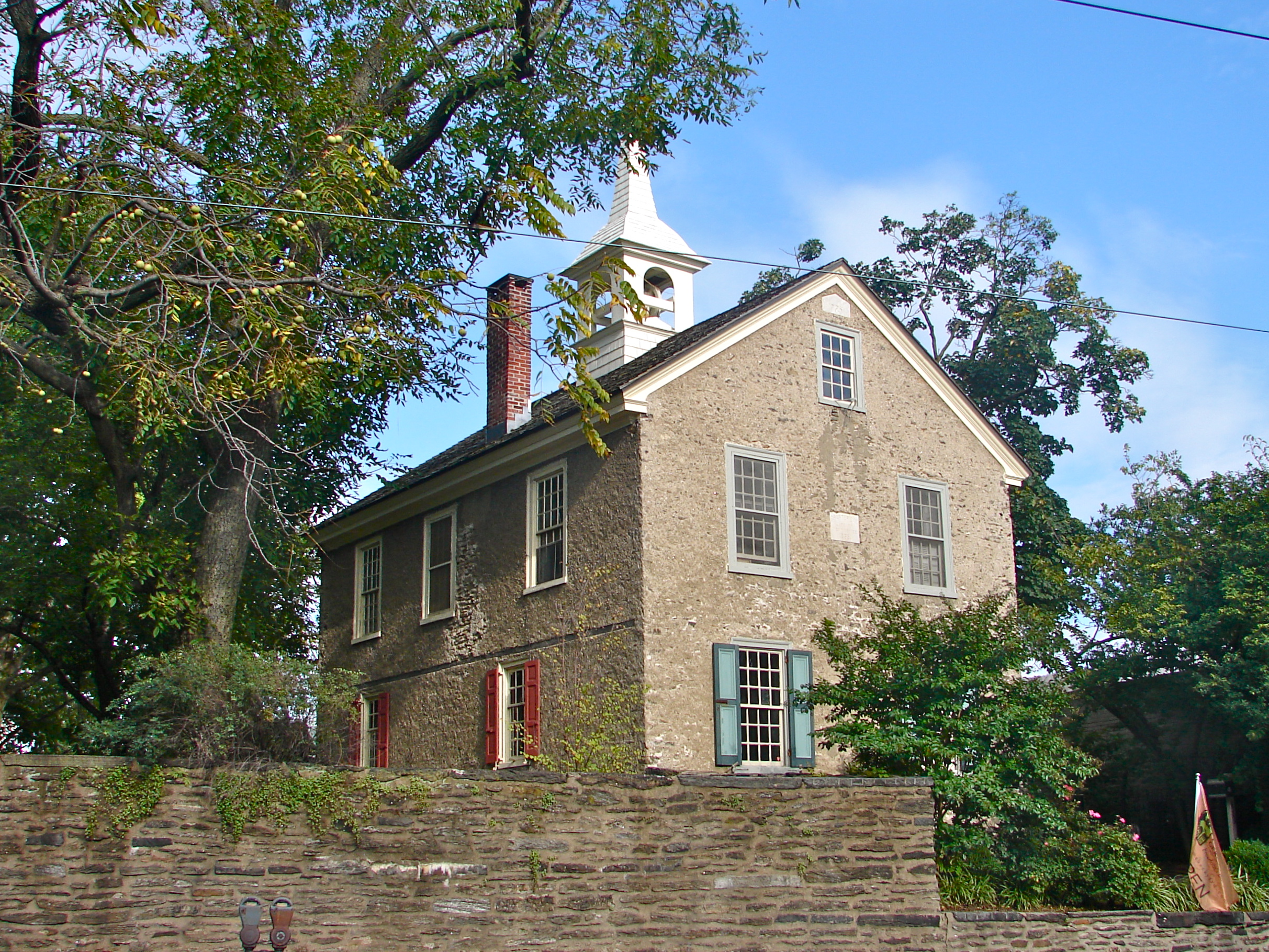
Concord School in the Germantown area of Philadelphia, birthplace of the Junior Order of United American Mechanics.

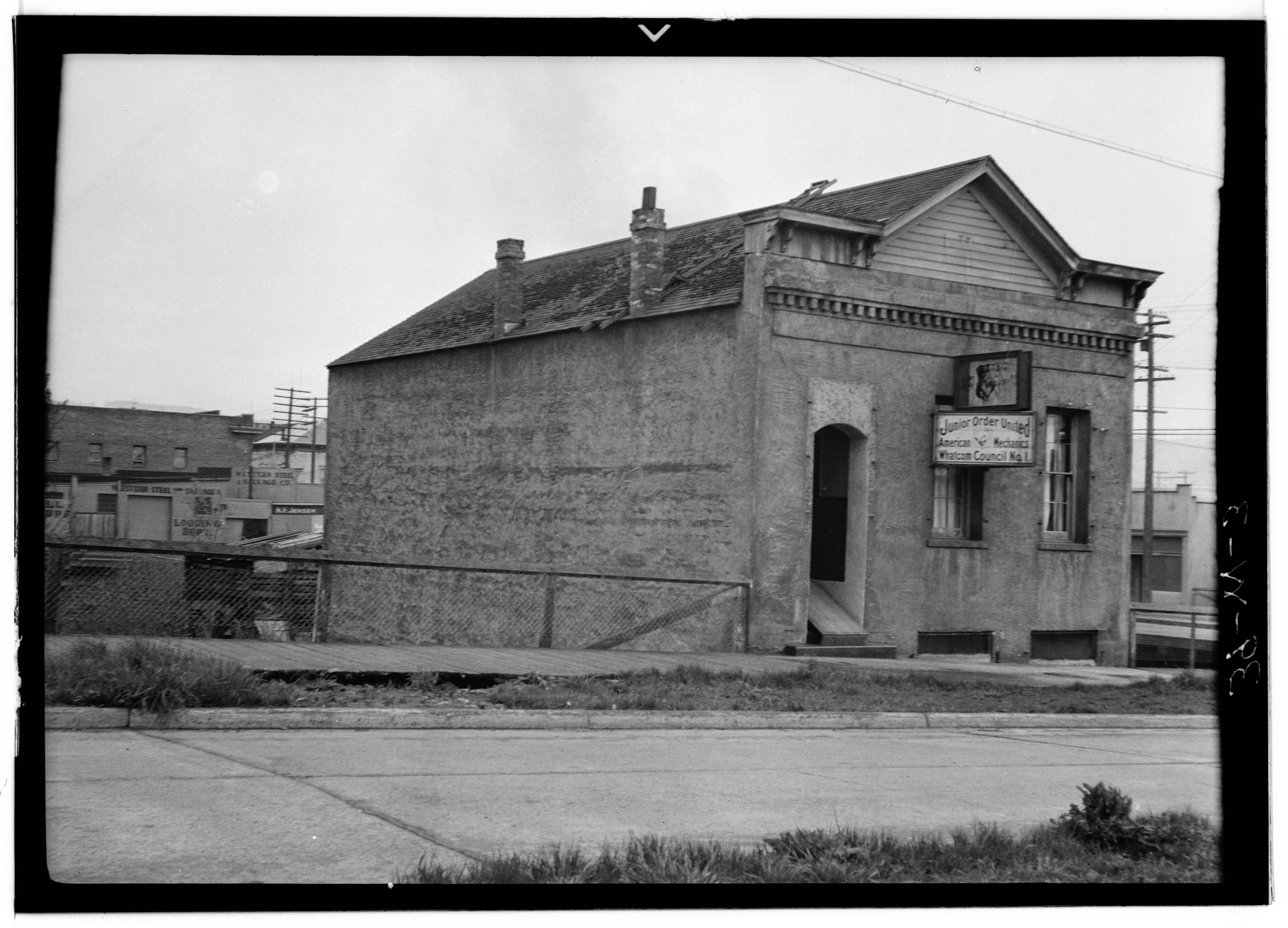
Junior Order of United American Mechanics Whatcom Council No. 1, Bellingham, Washington. Date unknown, probably c. 1970s

Junior Order United American Mechanics (Jr. O.U.A.M.) is a fraternal organization founded on May 17, 1853, in Germantown, Philadelphia, Pennsylvania, as a youth auxiliary to the Order of United American Mechanics (O.U.A.M.). Established during a period of significant social transformation in the United States, the organization aimed to instill patriotic values, promote moral education, and foster civic responsibility among young men.

== History ==
The Jr. O.U.A.M. was created to provide a structured environment where young men could learn about American history, civic duties, and moral conduct. While its parent organization emphasized native labor and cultural preservation in the mid-19th century, the Junior Order gradually evolved into a service-oriented fraternal organization. It emphasized public education, support for the U.S. Constitution, and benevolent outreach. Local councils were soon established beyond Pennsylvania, and by the 1870s, the Junior Order had grown large enough to organize its own National Council, formally separating from the O.U.A.M. and becoming an independent body.

Throughout the late 19th century, the organization expanded rapidly across the United States. By the early 20th century, it had councils in over 30 states and held regular national conventions. Rituals, degrees, and formal ceremonies helped convey lessons on personal integrity, civic virtue, and American history.

A major milestone was the establishment of the National Orphans’ Home in Tiffin, Ohio, in the early 1900s. The home was created to care for children of deceased members and offered not just housing, but also vocational training, education, and spiritual guidance. It operated entirely on member contributions and was managed by trustees elected from within the Order.

The Order faced internal challenges in the early 20th century, particularly regarding governance. Disputes between the National Council and state councils—most notably in Pennsylvania and New Jersey—led to legal proceedings over constitutional authority and ritual revisions. By 1905, the National Council had prevailed in court and reasserted control over its organizational structure, reestablishing loyal councils in the contested states.

In 1923, the Junior Order United American Mechanics had 253,399 members in its "Funeral Benefit Dept" and 22,519 "Beneficiary Degree" members. Its headquarters at that time were located at 741 Wabash Building, and it reportedly had state and local councils in nearly every state in the Union. It also ran a home for the orphans of deceased members in Tiffin, Ohio, which housed between 800 and 900 children. While the Order's purposes were mostly fraternal by this point, membership remained restricted to Protestants, and some of its officers still continued to advocate anti-Catholic positions.

By 1969, membership had dwindled to 35,172, 15,000 of which were social (non-insured) members. By 1979, the number had dropped further to 8,500, evenly divided between social and beneficiary members across 400 local councils. The group was then headquartered in Willow Grove, a suburb of Philadelphia, Pennsylvania, and held a national convention biennially. It also had a bimonthly newspaper, Junior American, which is still published.

Between 1925 and 1932, the Junior Order constructed the Junior Order United American Mechanics National Orphans Home near Lexington, North Carolina. This facility was added to the National Register of Historic Places in 1984.

In the decades that followed, the Junior Order became an influential civic organization. It organized parades, public ceremonies, and school flag programs while maintaining funeral benefits and fraternal support. Though not a labor union, its mutual aid structure shared similarities with other workingmen's organizations of the time, particularly in offering community solidarity and material assistance.

Following World War II, like many fraternal societies, the Junior Order experienced a gradual decline in membership due to broader social changes, such as the rise of government welfare programs and shifting leisure habits. Nevertheless, the Order continued to operate through active state and local councils.

Today, the Junior Order United American Mechanics remains active in several states. Its members engage in community service, award scholarships, support veterans, and participate in patriotic events. The organization continues to uphold its historic motto: "Virtue, Liberty, and Patriotism."

== Symbols and rituals ==
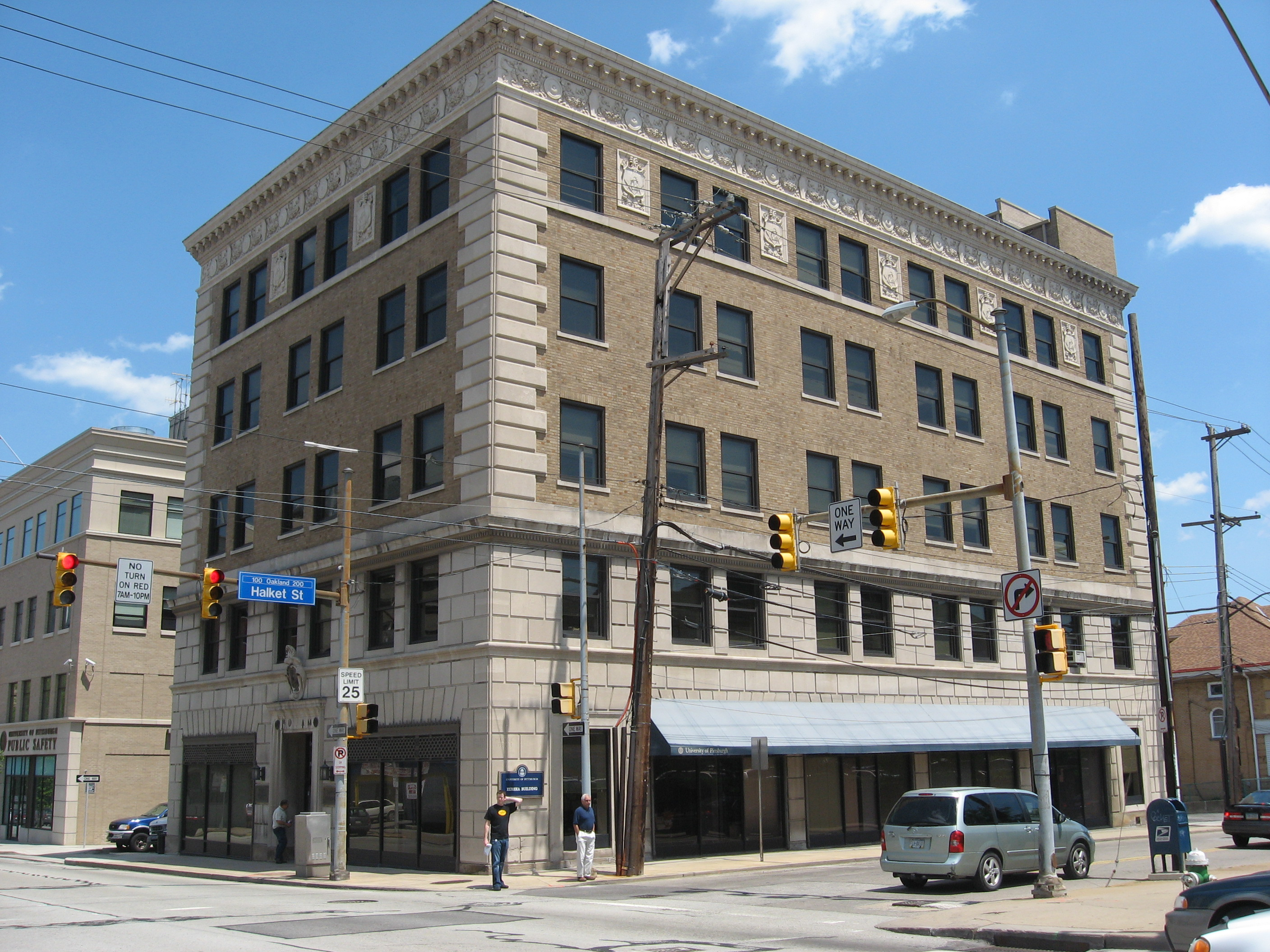
The Eureka Building on the campus of the University of Pittsburgh, the former Pittsburgh council Jr. O.U.A.M. building, still retains the insignia of the Order on its facade.

Like many fraternal organizations of the 19th and early 20th centuries, the Junior Order United American Mechanics developed an internal system of rituals, degrees, and symbolic practices. These traditions were intended to reinforce moral lessons, encourage loyalty, and foster fraternity among members. Although much of the ritual content remains private, historical records describe several recurring themes and symbols that reflect the Order’s civic and patriotic mission.

The Order historically conferred three degrees, each focusing on key virtues:

- The First Degree emphasized the importance of home, family, and moral behavior.
- The Second Degree centered on the responsibilities of citizenship and civic virtue.
- The Third Degree promoted national loyalty and patriotic service.

Meetings were typically held in lodge halls and included ceremonial opening and closing procedures, oaths, and the use of regalia. Officers wore sashes and badges to indicate their rank, and councils displayed the American flag prominently during all gatherings. The Bible, Constitution, and the flag were often placed at the center of rituals as symbols of truth, law, and loyalty.

The Junior Order adopted several key symbols:

- The American Flag – Representing national unity and allegiance.
- The All-Seeing Eye – Signifying divine oversight and personal accountability.
- The Square and Compass – Borrowed from craft guild and Masonic symbolism, indicating moral rectitude and skill.
- An Open Bible – Denoting the moral foundation of the Order’s teachings.

Public rituals were also a key aspect of the Order's work. Many councils organized flag presentations to schools, patriotic parades, and memorial services to honor deceased members and military veterans. These events often featured formal addresses, musical performances, and the involvement of local civic leaders.

While ritual observance has been simplified over time, many state and local councils continue to uphold traditional ceremonies during installations of officers, annual sessions, and commemorative occasions.

== Orphans’ Homes ==
=== Tiffin, Ohio ===
The idea of a National Orphans’ Home was first proposed in 1891 by Brother Charles Lawrence of Ohio. The concept gained traction and was adopted as one of the Order’s core objectives. A committee led by Brother J. H. Zimmerman of Plain City, Ohio—later dubbed the "Father of the Orphans’ Home"—oversaw the site selection and planning. The home officially opened in 1896 in Tiffin, Ohio, and received its first residents in August of that year.

The facility featured dormitories (referred to as cottages), a school, farmland, and vocational training buildings. It operated on a partially self-sustaining agricultural model and was supported by member contributions rather than state aid. At its height, the Tiffin home housed dozens of children from states across the country, providing them with formal education, Christian instruction, and work skills.

Despite financial hardship and organizational conflict in the early 1900s, the trustees managed to keep the home open to all eligible children without interruption. At one point, it had a net valuation of over $66,000 and served as a symbol of the Order’s mission of fraternity and care.

The home was shut down in the 1940s but its alumni—colloquially known as "Home Kids"—still have a homecoming reunion over Labor Day weekend in September.

=== Lexington, North Carolina ===
In addition to the national facility in Ohio, the North Carolina State Council initiated the founding of its own orphanage. At the 1905 State Council session in Goldsboro, a resolution was adopted stating: "that the State Council of North Carolina Jr. O.U.A.M., establish an Orphans' Home in our State."

A committee of five was appointed to solicit site proposals, determine costs, and report at the next session. While the original Tiffin home remained the official national facility, the establishment of a North Carolina home marked a regional commitment to support orphans closer to local membership bases.

Between 1925 and 1932, the Junior Order constructed the Junior Order United American Mechanics National Orphans Home near Lexington, North Carolina. This facility was added to the National Register of Historic Places in 1984.

The home operated under the name "American Children's Home," continuing the legacy of the Junior Order's dedication to orphans and widows. This facility still exists today as a nonsectarian, nonprofit residential program for children in need.

== See also ==
- Daughters of America, the JOUAM female auxiliary
