= Upper Burial Ground =

Historic cemetery in Germantown, Philadelphia, Pennsylvania

- U.S. National Historic Landmark District – Contributing property
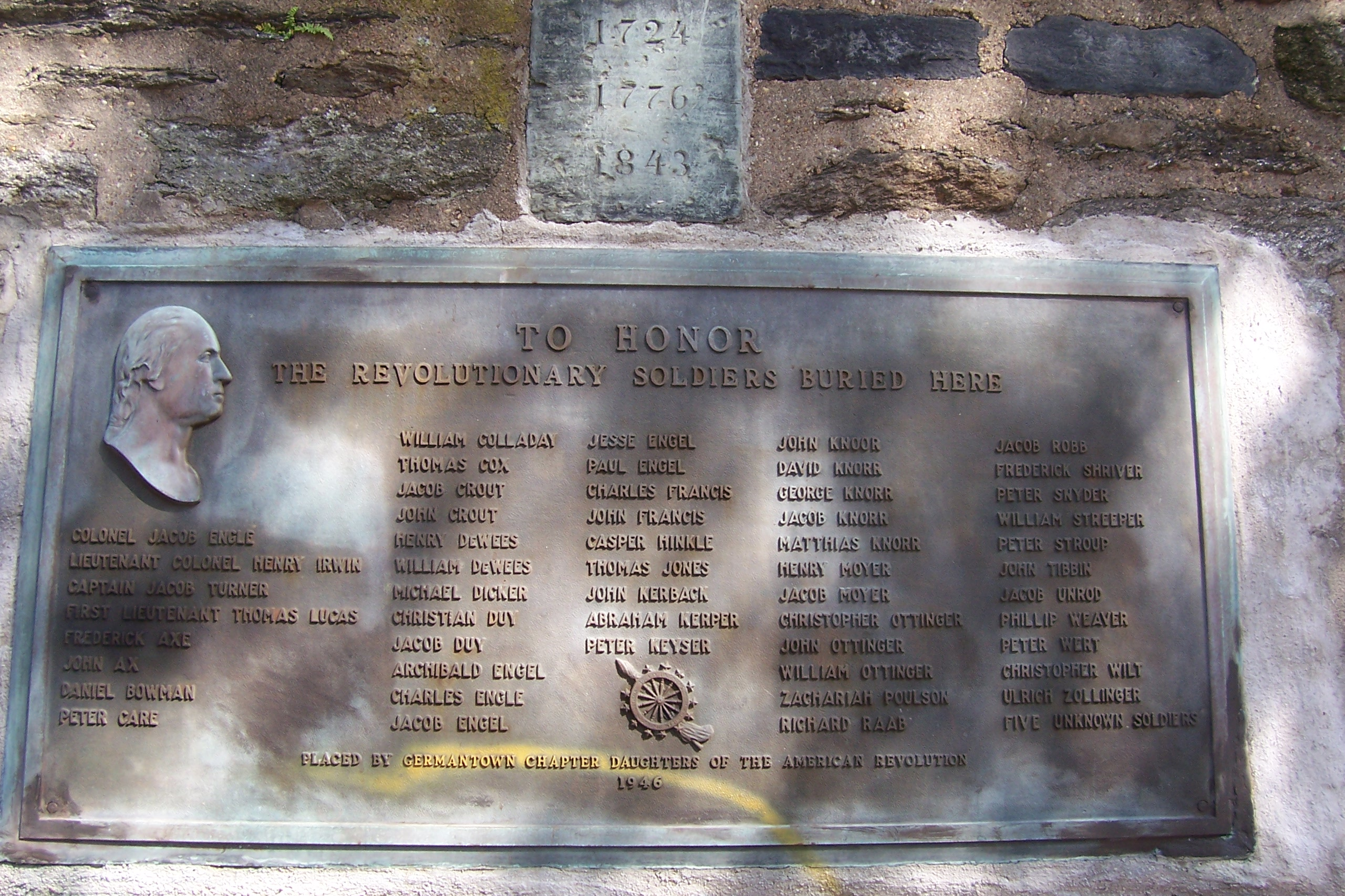
- Upper Burial Ground Marker

- Location within Pennsylvania
- Location: Germantown Ave. and Washington Lane; Philadelphia, Pennsylvania
- Coordinates: 40°2′37″N 75°10′51″W
- Built: 1692

The Upper Burial Ground is a cemetery in the Germantown section of Philadelphia, Pennsylvania. It is notable as the last resting place of 58 American soldiers from the Battle of Germantown in the American Revolution. Here also lies many of the founders of Germantown, including William Dewees, sheriff of Germantown's independent government. Also buried here is Zachariah Poulson, who died in 1844 after having published The American Daily Advertiser, Philadelphia's principal daily newspaper for many years. Another significant grave is that of Alexander Mack, the founder of the Schwarzenau Brethren (or German Baptist Brethren). Originally buried in Axe's Burial Ground in 1735, his remains were carefully removed in 1894 along with his field stone to the God's Acre in the rear of the Brethren church, where they now repose beside those of his son, Alexander, and family.

One of the earliest stones is Cornelius Tyson who arrived in Germantown in 1684 and died in 1716 at age 63. It is adjacent to the Concord School House.

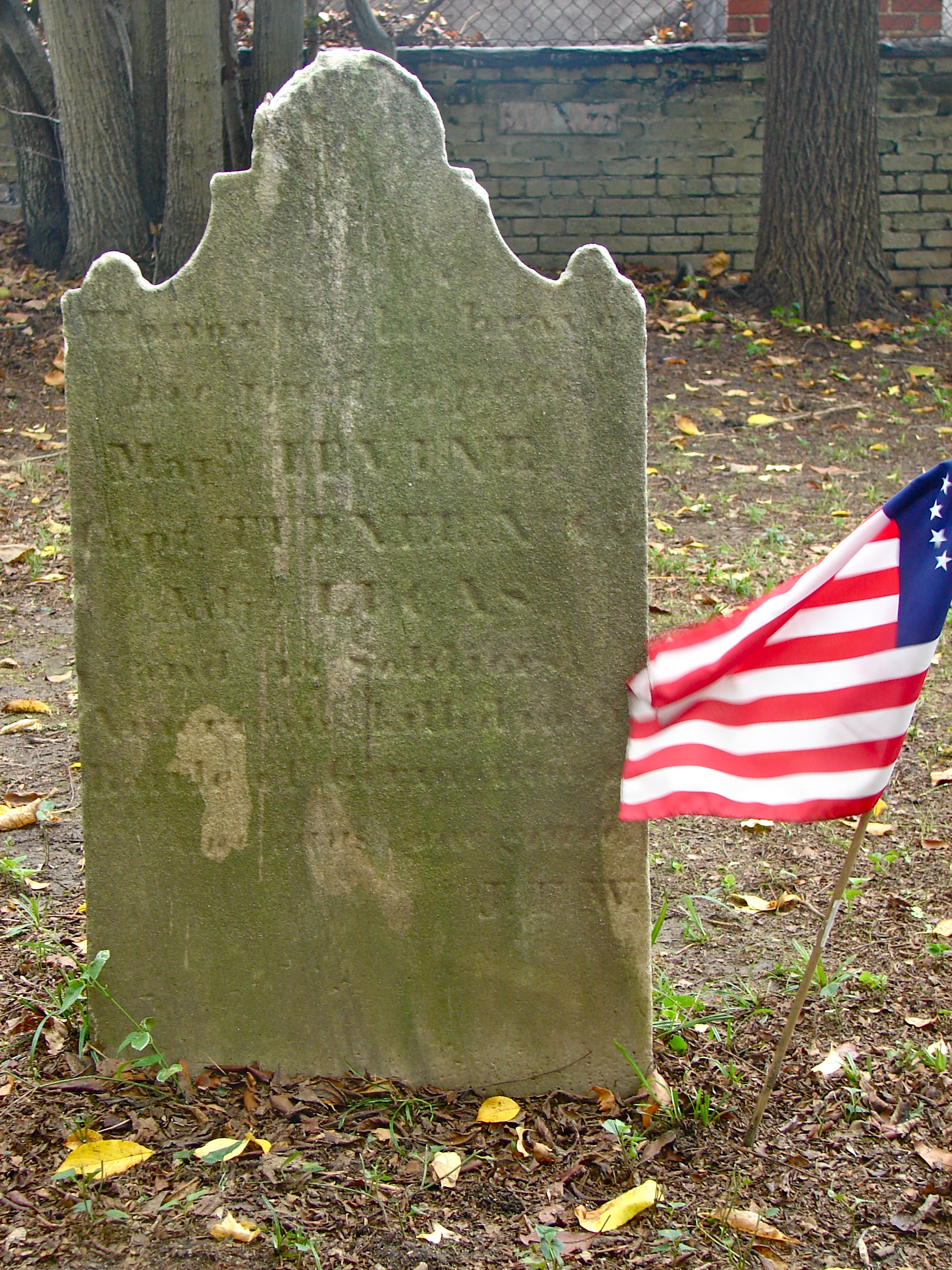
Marker on the presumed site of the mass grave of 58 American soldiers killed in the Battle of Germantown

The Upper Burial Ground is a contributing property of the Colonial Germantown Historic District, which is listed on the National Register of Historic Places.

== Sources ==
- Jenkins, Charles Francis. The Guide Book to Historic Germantown, Prepared for the Site & Relic Society. 1926.
