= Order of United American Mechanics =

19th century American nativist organization

The Order of United American Mechanics was an anti-Catholic American Nativist organization of the mid-19th century. It was founded in Philadelphia amid the anti-alien riots of 1844-45. It originally was called the Union of Workers. Members were required to undertake efforts to publicize and campaign against the hiring of cheap foreign labor and to patronize only "American" businesses.

== History ==
The Order grew out of the resentment many native-born American workers in Philadelphia felt toward foreigners during the depression of the mid-1840s. As many American workers were laid off, poor German immigrants were allegedly taking their jobs at lower wages. In late 1844 a group of workers met in a series of conferences and decided to use their influence to secure the employment of American-born workers and make purchases from Americans, rather than immigrants. Among this group were Luther Chapin, George Tucker, James Lane, Richard Howell, Ethan Briggs and John Smulling.

Seeing the benefits of organization, on July 4, 1845 these men and others held a meeting at 134 North Second Street in a room above Edward K. Tyrons rifle factory. The result of this conference was a subscription to rent out Jefferson Temperance Hall on July 8 for a convention to organize a secret society of workingmen. The initial conference opened with an attendance of nearly sixty, but when the object of forming a secret society became apparent, the majority of the original attendees left and the conference was left with twenty five delegates, which included the six mentioned above.

A further conference was held on July 15, which adopted resolutions on the purposes of the order and named it the American Mechanical Union. The group was renamed Order of United American Mechanics on July 22, adopted a constitution on July 29 and adopted it ritual on August 4. The group grew, chartering its second local lodge, called a council, in September. A State Council was organized for Pennsylvania on November 13, 1845 and a National Council on July 3, 1846. Luther Chapin was president of both the Pennsylvania State Council and the National Council.

== National organization ==
Unlike other Nativist societies that sprang up in the 1840s and 1850s, the OAUM was able to survive the Civil War. By 1896 there were State Councils in twenty one states and the order had 60,000 members. The Order offered sick and death benefits, along the lines offered by contemporary groups like the Oddfellows and Improved Order of Red Men, from October 1845. By 1896 the group was paying out funeral benefits of $300, supervised by the local Councils. The insurance department was under the control of the National Council and an Advisory Board and paid out up to $1000. Both programs were paid out on an assessment of those wished to avail themselves of this aspect of membership. Despite its name, the group never acted as a trade union or took a part in labor disputes. Indeed, its membership became less working class as it attracted people from diverse social and economic backgrounds.

== Auxiliary orders ==
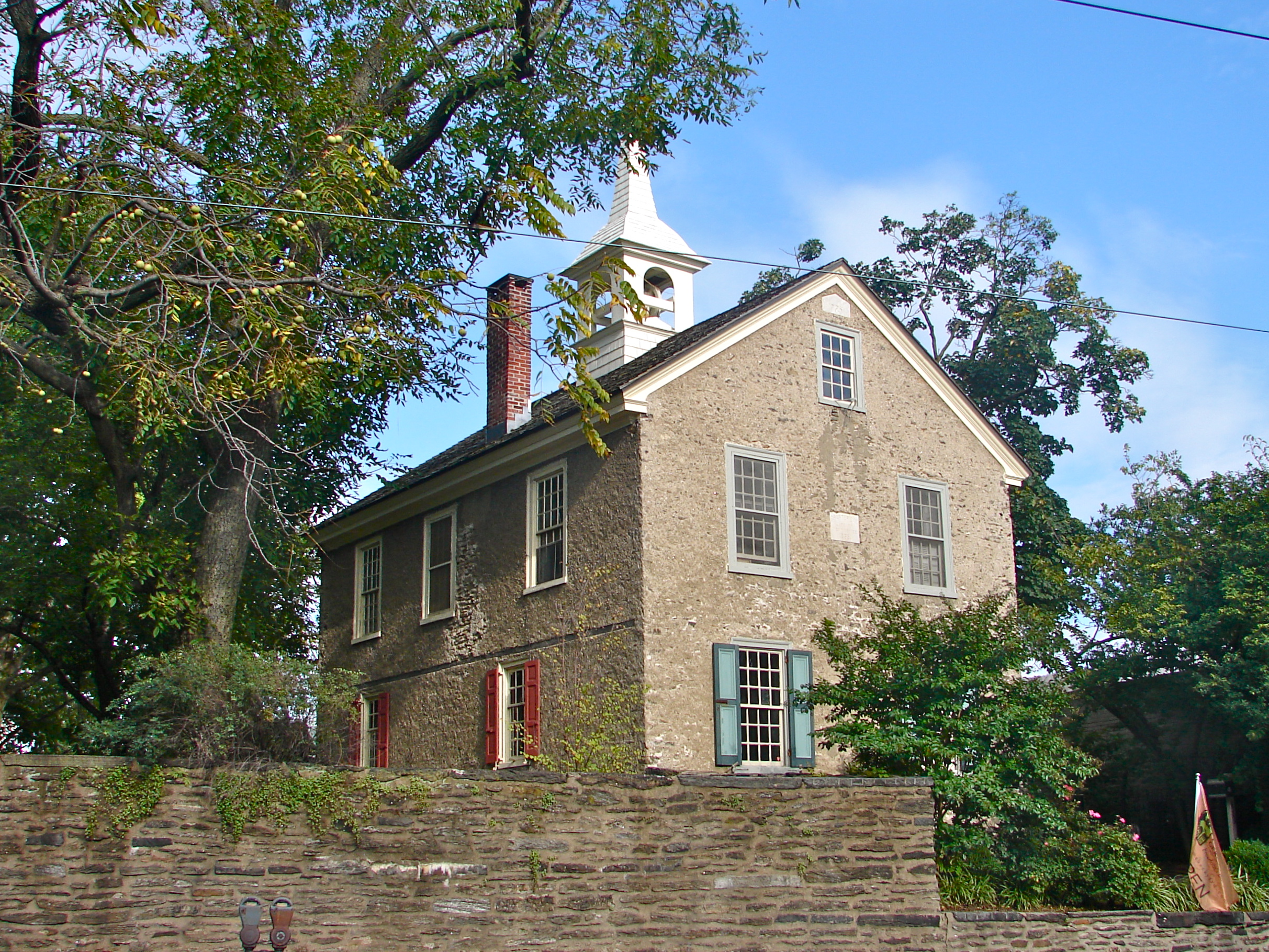
Concord School in the Germantown area of Philadelphia, believed to be the site of the founding of the Junior Order of United American Mechanics.

=== Junior Order of United American Mechanics ===
In 1853 it created the Junior Order of United American Mechanics, as a youth auxiliary. This group would eventually become more popular than the OUAM itself and became an independent adult organization in 1885.

=== Daughters of Liberty ===
A female auxiliary, the Daughters of Liberty, began as a local club to assist members of the Columbia Council in Meriden, Connecticut in January 1875. It was founded by E. W. Munsen. Other local Councils sprang up across Connecticut, as well as New York, New Jersey and Massachusetts. By 1896 there were 30,000 members of the Daughters of Liberty. Membership was restricted to native born, white American women aged sixteen or over, and to male members of the Order of United American Mechanics.

=== Loyal Legion of the Order of United American Mechanics ===
In 1887 the Order created the Loyal Legion of the Order of United American Mechanics as a "uniformed division" which participated in drill and sword exercises and had a ritual of its own which was said to be derived from similar groups within the Oddfellows, Knights of Pythias and Foresters, themselves supposedly derived from the Masonic Knights Templar.

== Decline ==
Over time, the OUAM abandoned its Nativist politics and became a standard insurance society, even dropping the word "Order" from its name to become just the "United American Mechanics". It was eventually absorbed by its former youth affiliate, the Junior Order of United American Mechanics.

== Ritual ==
The ritual and symbolism of the group was said to be heavily influenced by that of the Freemasons. Of the twenty five original founders, four were Freemasons and four other delegates were eventually raised to the Craft. The emblem of the Order incorporated the square and compasses with an arm and hammer in the middle.

== Beliefs ==
We, the undersigned American born citizens, having for years, and more particularly of late, felt the peculiar disadvantages under which we are placed from foreign competition and foreign combinations, and believing, from past experience and present appearances of the future, that instead of the evil abating, there is a strong probability, if not a certainty, of its increasing, therefore we feel ourselves bound, by the duty we owe to God, our country, our families, and ourselves, to provide for our own protection by forming ourselves into an association to advance such objects and carry out such principles as shall best promote the interest, elevate the character and secure the happiness of the body of American born citizens. Coupled with these laudable endeavors to secure to posterity the privileges we enjoy, is the ennobling and praiseworthy duty of aiding our fellow man in distress; then when laid upon a bed of sickness, the friendly and, we trust, timely aid of this Order may be manifest in providing for our necessities. In the silent watches of the night, a friend will ever be ready to administer to our wants, and if Death lays his cold hand upon us, we shall depart with the assurance that our widowed consorts will be the recipients of the imperishable friendship of our Order, and if needs be, that pecuniary assistance which will soften the asperity of their desolate condition.

The paternal guardianship of this Order will ever bring our fatherless children within their watchful care, and especially will the orphans be protected from the snares of a cold and heartless world, and placed in the path that leads them to honor and usefulness here and to a blessed rest hereafter.

Therefore, for the purpose of advancing such objects and principles, we hereby pledge ourselves as Americans, to use every fair and honorable means consistent with our duty as citizens and our social duties to the human family, and agree to be governed by the following Constitution.

— Preamble to Constitution

In 1903 the rules used by one Doylestown, Pennsylvania group stated that membership was open to "white male citizens, born in the United States". The objects of the order were employment assistance, supporting member's businesses, assisting ill members, and providing funeral and survivor benefits. Meeting were each Wednesday evening. Dues were 15 cents a week. There were disability benefits of $5 for first 13 weeks, $4 next 13 weeks, and $3 onwards. Funeral benefits were $100, or for a spouse $50. Donations to distressed families were limited to a maximum of $2. The funds were invested in "good real estate securities".
