= Grumblethorpe =

Historic house in Pennsylvania, United States

- U.S. National Register of Historic Places
- U.S. National Historic Landmark District – Contributing property
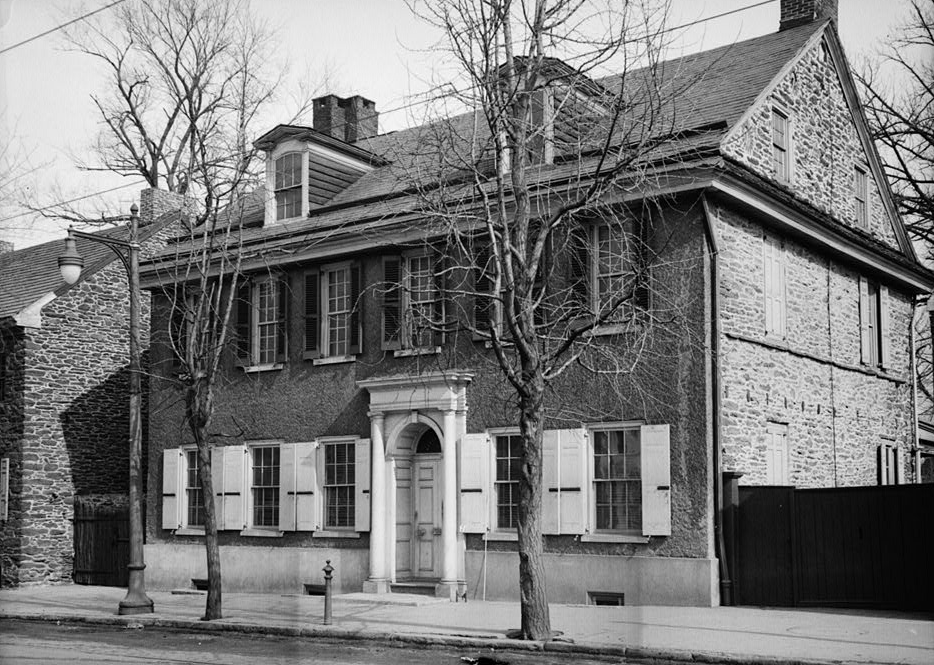
- Grumblethorpe prior to its restoration in the 1960s, displaying its early 19th-century Georgian-style façade

- Location within Philadelphia Location within Pennsylvania Location within the United States
- Location: 5267 Germantown Avenue, Germantown, Philadelphia, Pennsylvania, U.S.
- Coordinates: 40°1′56″N 75°10′6″W
- Area: < 1-acre (4,000 m^{2})
- Built: 1744
- Architectural style: American Georgian
- NRHP reference No.: 72001155
- Added to NRHP: March 16, 1972

Grumblethorpe was the home of the Wister family in the present-day Germantown section of Philadelphia, who lived there for over 160 years. It was built in 1744 as a summer residence, but it became the family's year-round residence in 1793. It is a museum, part of the Colonial Germantown Historic District.

== History ==
=== 18th century ===
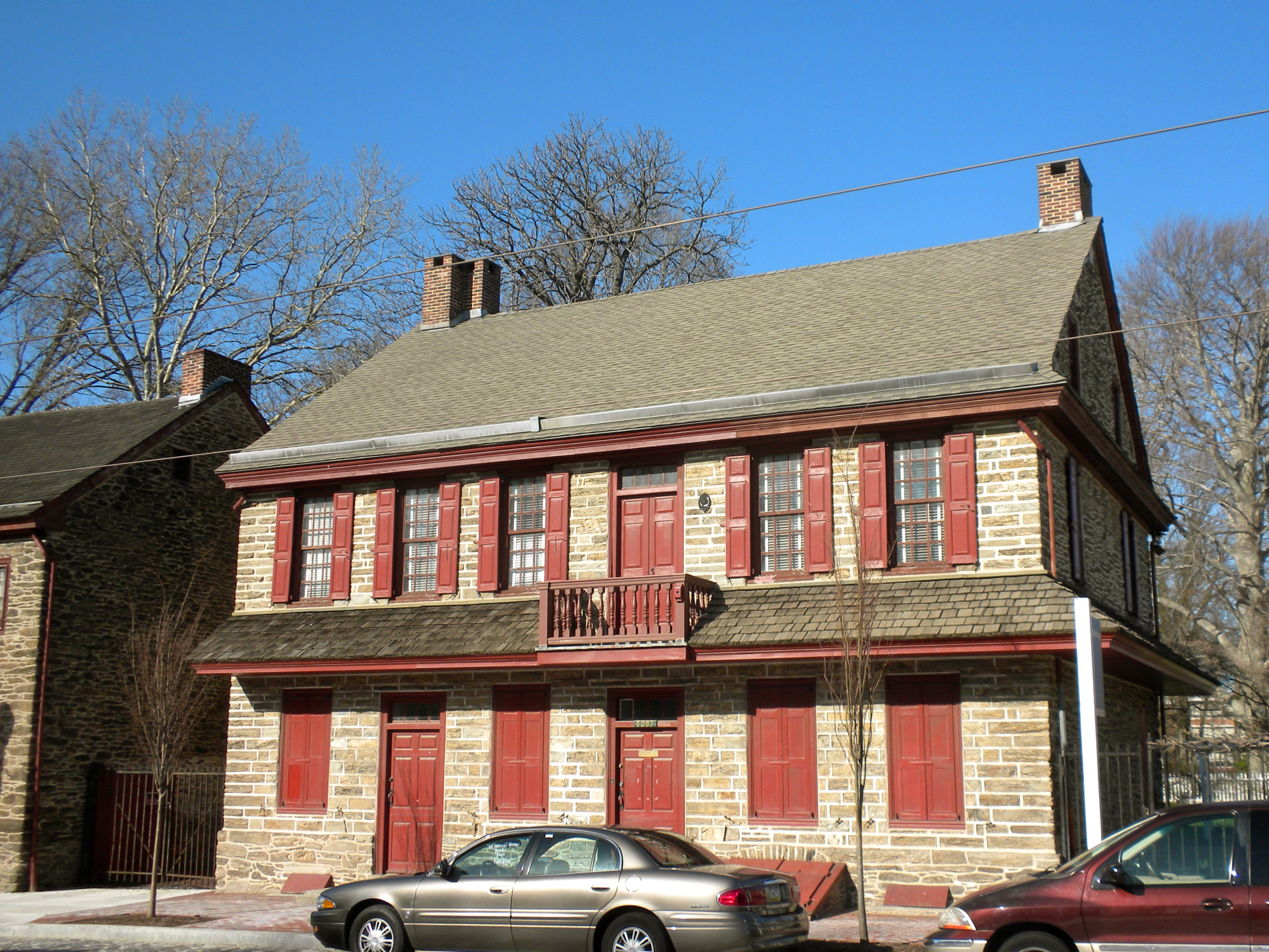
The front of Grumblethorpe after its restoration

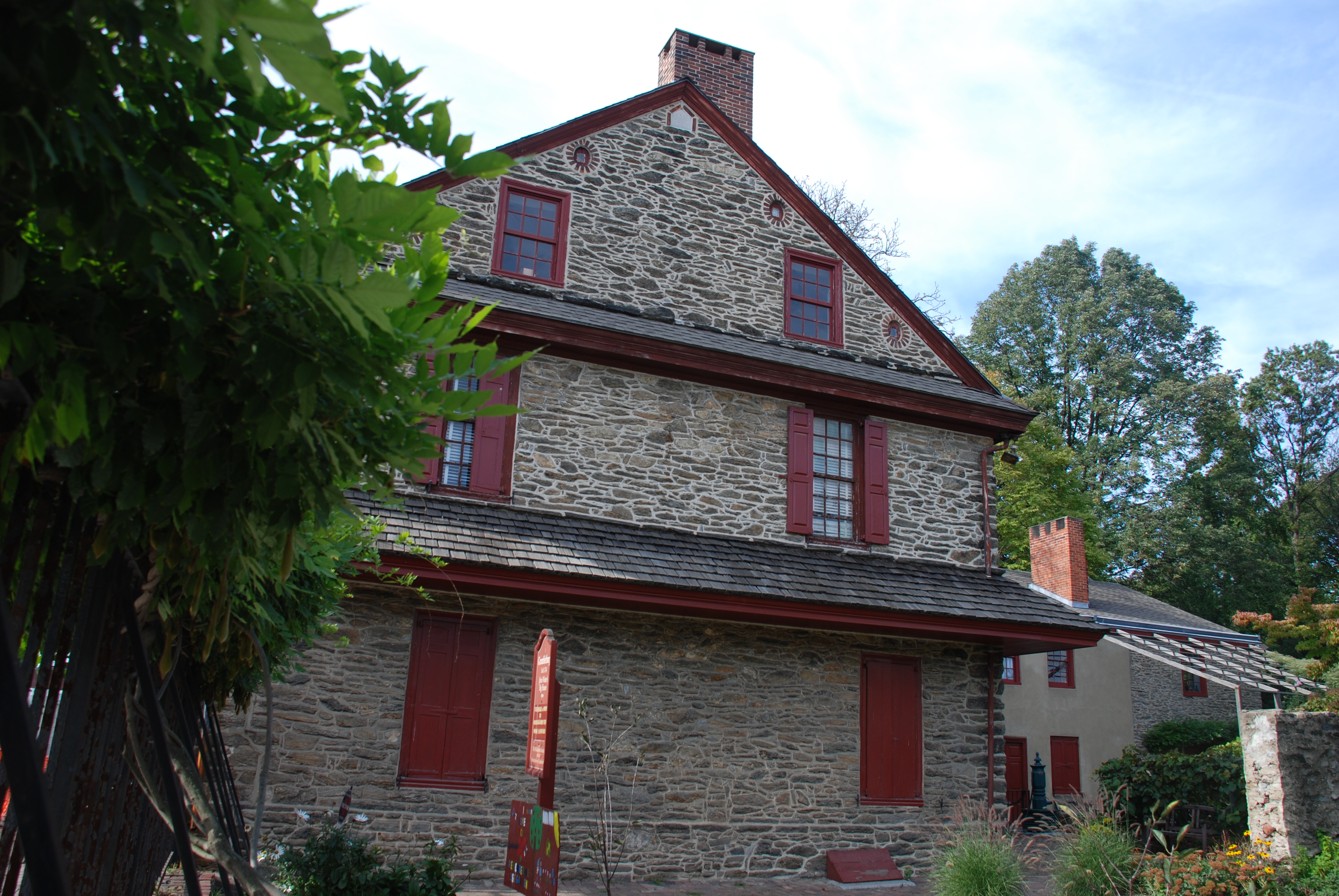
A side view of Grumblethorpe after its restoration

Grumblethorpe was built as a summer residence in 1744 by Philadelphia merchant and wine importer John Wister, when Germantown was a semi-rural area outside the city of Philadelphia. It eventually became the family's year-round residence when they withdrew from the city during the Yellow Fever Epidemic of 1793.

It has a stone and oak facade and was known as "John Wister's Big House". It has lower-ceilinged rooms than those at Cliveden, Loudoun, and Stenton, other historic houses in the area. The stones for the house were quarried on the property and the joists were hewn from oaks in Wister Woods, also owned by the family. The original section of the Grumblethorpe Tenant House was built as a dependency.

The Wister family lived in the house for over 160 years. Diarist Sally Wister subsequently lived there from 1789 until her death in 1804.

Because it was built on the fertile soil of the region, Grumblethorpe's garden was highly productive. It was primarily a working farm, and it dominated Philadelphia's horticultural trends for nearly two centuries from 1740 to 1910. The land was a prime source of marketable crops and animal husbandry from the 1740s to the 1870s, and it decreased in practical use only when the farmstead grew smaller in the late 19th century.

=== American Revolutionary War ===
In September 1777, the house was the scene of events in the Battle of Germantown. While the Wisters were staying in another home, British General James Agnew occupied the house as his headquarters during the battle. He was wounded and died in the front parlor, where his blood stains can still be seen on the floor.

=== 20th century ===
In the 1960s, the house was restored and refurnished to match the original period, removing an early 19th-century Georgian-style façade, and now serves as a museum. The gardens are also being restored.

Grumblethorpe was listed on the National Register of Historic Places in 1972. It is a contributing property of the Colonial Germantown Historic District, which has been designated a National Historic Landmark.

== See also ==
National Register of Historic Places listings in Northwest Philadelphia
