= Conyngham-Hacker House =

Historic house in Pennsylvania, United States

- U.S. National Register of Historic Places
- U.S. National Historic Landmark District – Contributing property
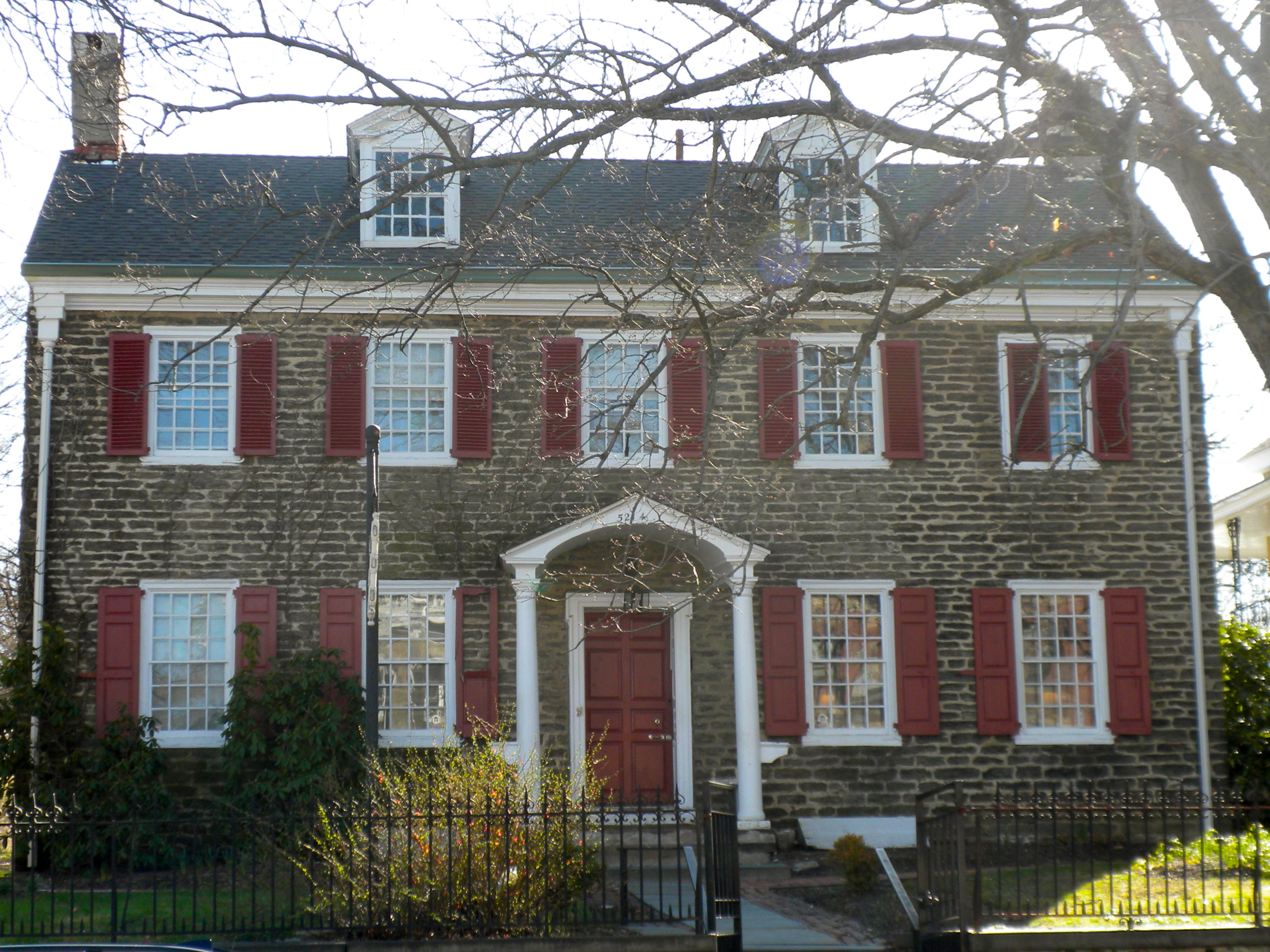

- Location within Philadelphia Location within Pennsylvania Location within the United States
- Location: 5214 Germantown Ave., Philadelphia, Pennsylvania
- Coordinates: 40°1′52″N 75°10′4″W
- Area: less than one acre
- Built: 1755
- NRHP reference No.: 72001149
- Added to NRHP: January 13, 1972

The Conyngham-Hacker House (aka the Old Fisher House) is a historic house in the Germantown section of Philadelphia, Pennsylvania. The 2½-story stone house was built in 1755 by William Forbes. It was known successively as the Conyngham, Wister, and Hacker House. The building served as a boarding school and as the headquarters of the Germantown Historical Society.

The Conyngham-Hacker House was added to the National Register of Historic Places in 1972. It is a contributing property of the Colonial Germantown Historic District.
