= Ivy Lodge =

Historic house in Pennsylvania, United States

- U.S. National Register of Historic Places
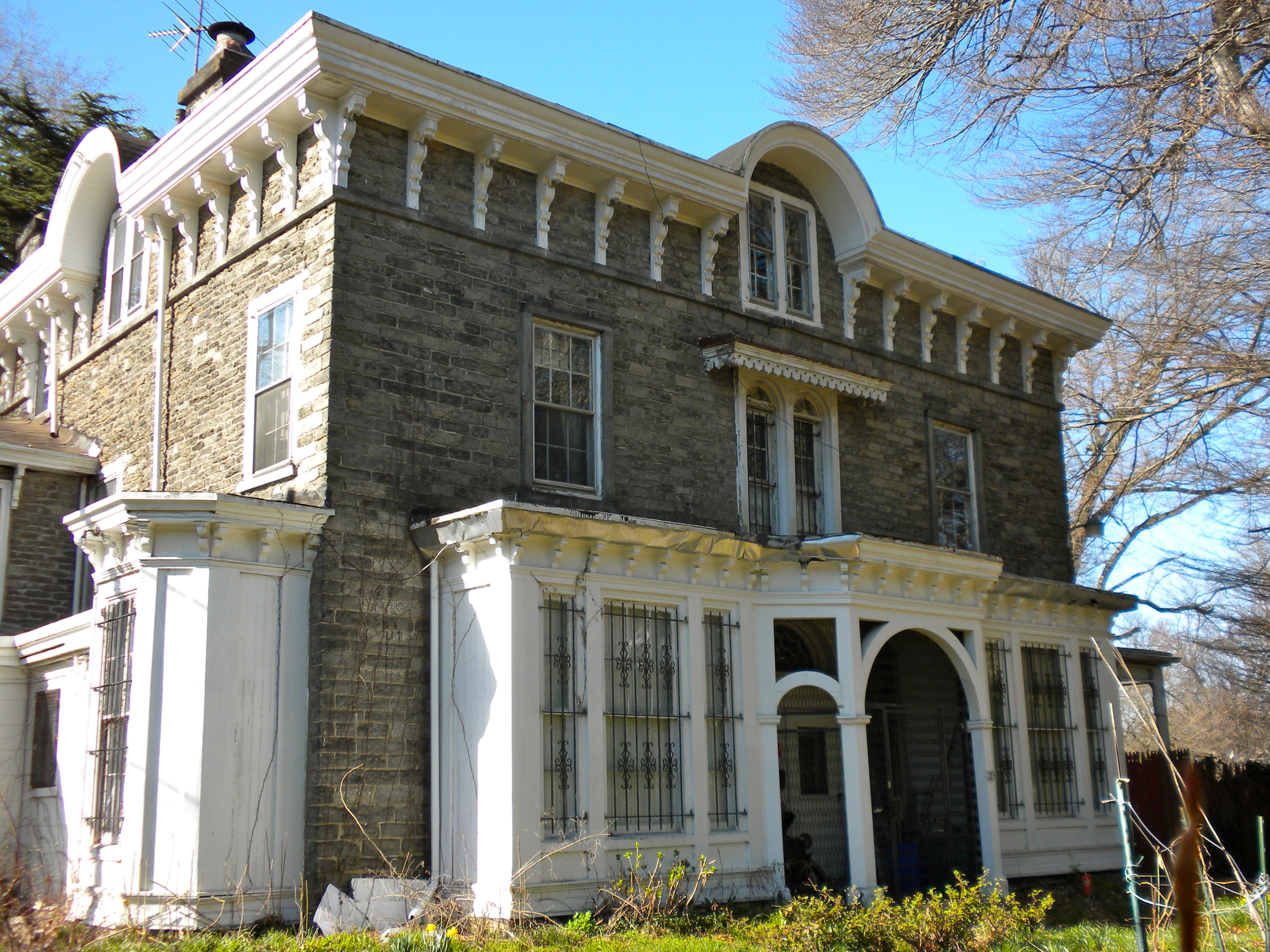
- Ivy Lodge, March 2010

- Location within Philadelphia Location within Pennsylvania Location within the United States
- Location: 29 E. Penn St., Philadelphia, Pennsylvania
- Coordinates: 40°2′4″N 75°10′6″W
- Area: 1.5 acres (0.61 ha)
- Built: c. 1850
- Architect: Sloan, Samuel
- Architectural style: Italianate
- NRHP reference No.: 72001161
- Added to NRHP: February 1, 1972

The Ivy Lodge is an historic home which is located in the Wister neighborhood of Germantown in Philadelphia, Pennsylvania, United States.

It was added to the National Register of Historic Places in 1972.

== History and architectural features ==
It was originally the home of John Jay Smith, founder of Philadelphia's Laurel Hill Cemetery and librarian at the Library Company of Philadelphia. According to an 1853 article in The Horticulturist, the building was designed by "an English architect" and was "carried out and improved by" Thomas Ustick Walter.

It is a two-story, ashlar granite dwelling which was designed in the Italianate style. It has a hipped roof with bracketed eaves, semi-circular arched dormers, and porch.
