= Vernon-Wister House =

Historic house in Pennsylvania, United States

Coordinates: 40°2′9″N 75°10′35″W

- U.S. National Historic Landmark District – Contributing property
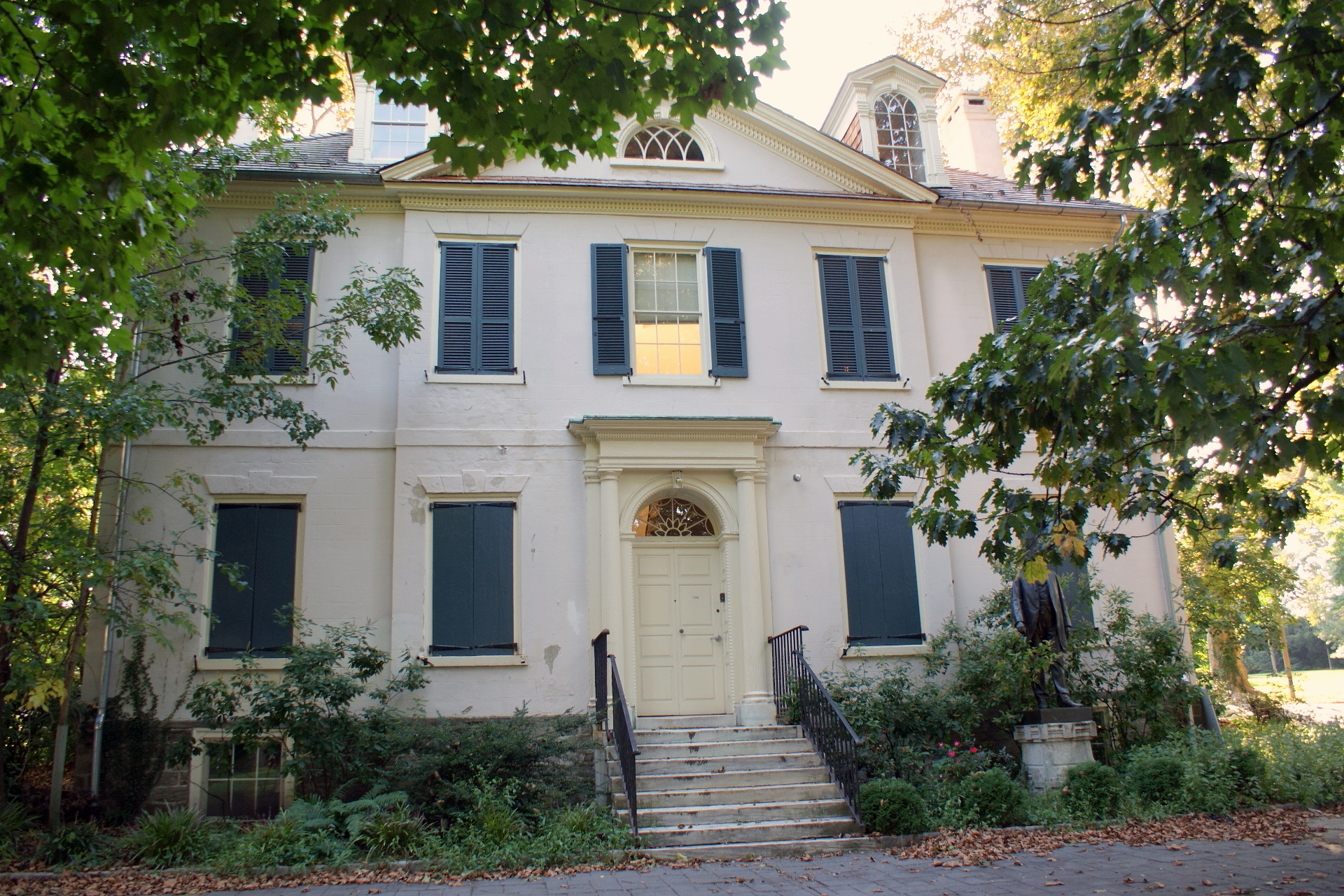

- Location within Pennsylvania
- Location: 5708 Germantown Ave., Philadelphia, Pennsylvania
- Built: 1803
- Architectural style: Federal
- Part of: Colonial Germantown Historic District (ID66000678)
- Added to NRHP: October 15, 1966

The Vernon-Wister House is a historic house in Germantown, Philadelphia, Pennsylvania. It was built in 1803 by James Matthews, from whom John Wister purchased it in 1812. His son, John Wister, was a member of Congress and lived in Vernon until his death in 1883.

The Vernon-Wister House is a contributing property of the Colonial Germantown Historic District, which is listed in the National Register of Historic Places.
