= Howell House (Philadelphia, Pennsylvania) =

Historic house in Pennsylvania, United States

- U.S. National Register of Historic Places
- U.S. National Historic Landmark District – Contributing property
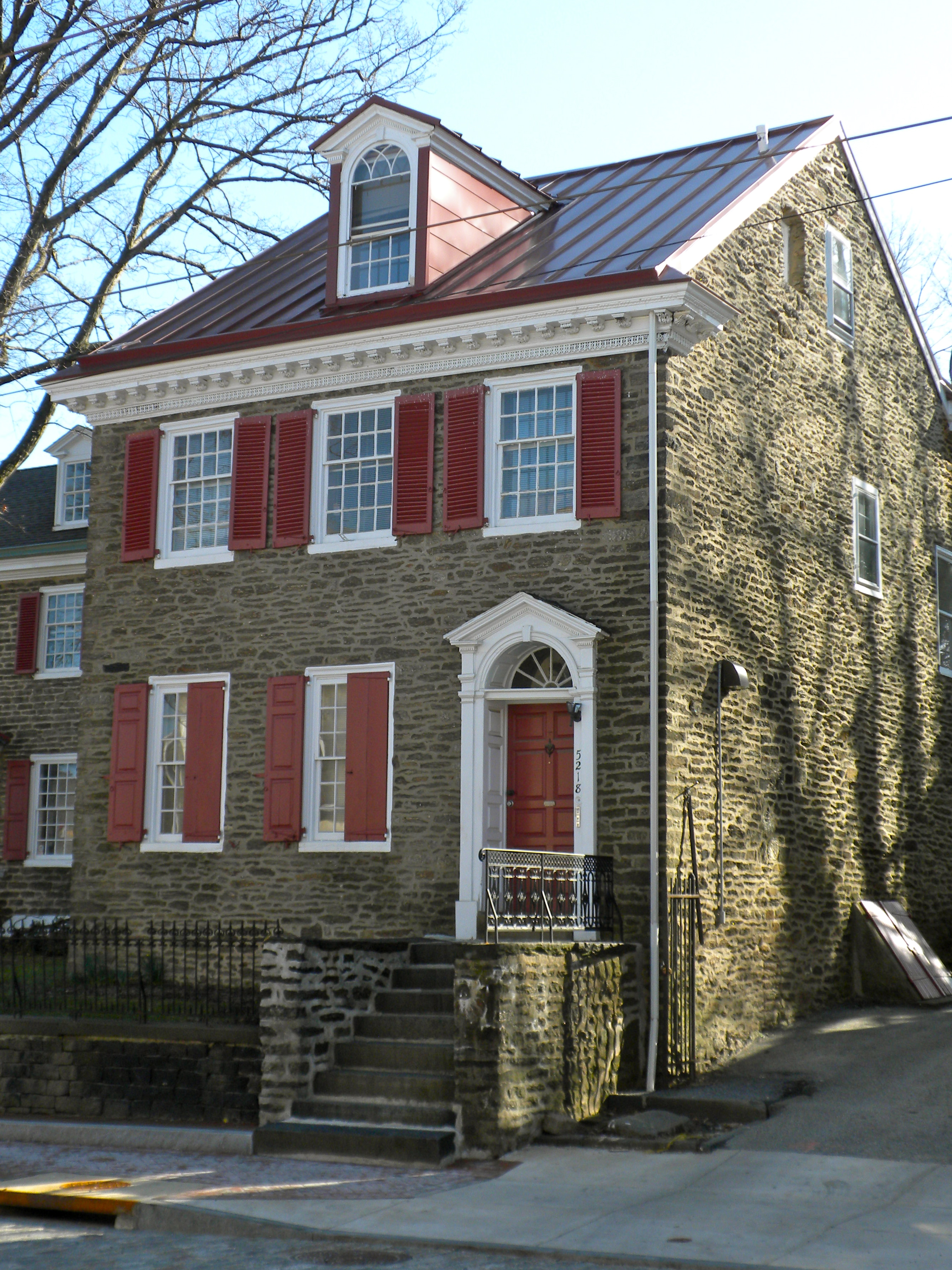

- Location within Philadelphia Location within Pennsylvania Location within the United States
- Location: 5218 Germantown Ave., Philadelphia, Pennsylvania
- Coordinates: 40°1′52″N 75°10′5″W
- Area: less than one acre
- Built: 1795
- Architectural style: Federal
- NRHP reference No.: 72001159
- Added to NRHP: January 13, 1972

The Howell House is a historic house in the Germantown section of Philadelphia, Pennsylvania. The three-story stone house was built in 1795 by William Forbes.

It was listed on the National Register of Historic Places in 1972. It is a contributing property of the Colonial Germantown Historic District.
