= Daniel Billmeyer House =

Historic house in Pennsylvania, United States

- U.S. National Register of Historic Places
- U.S. National Historic Landmark District – Contributing property
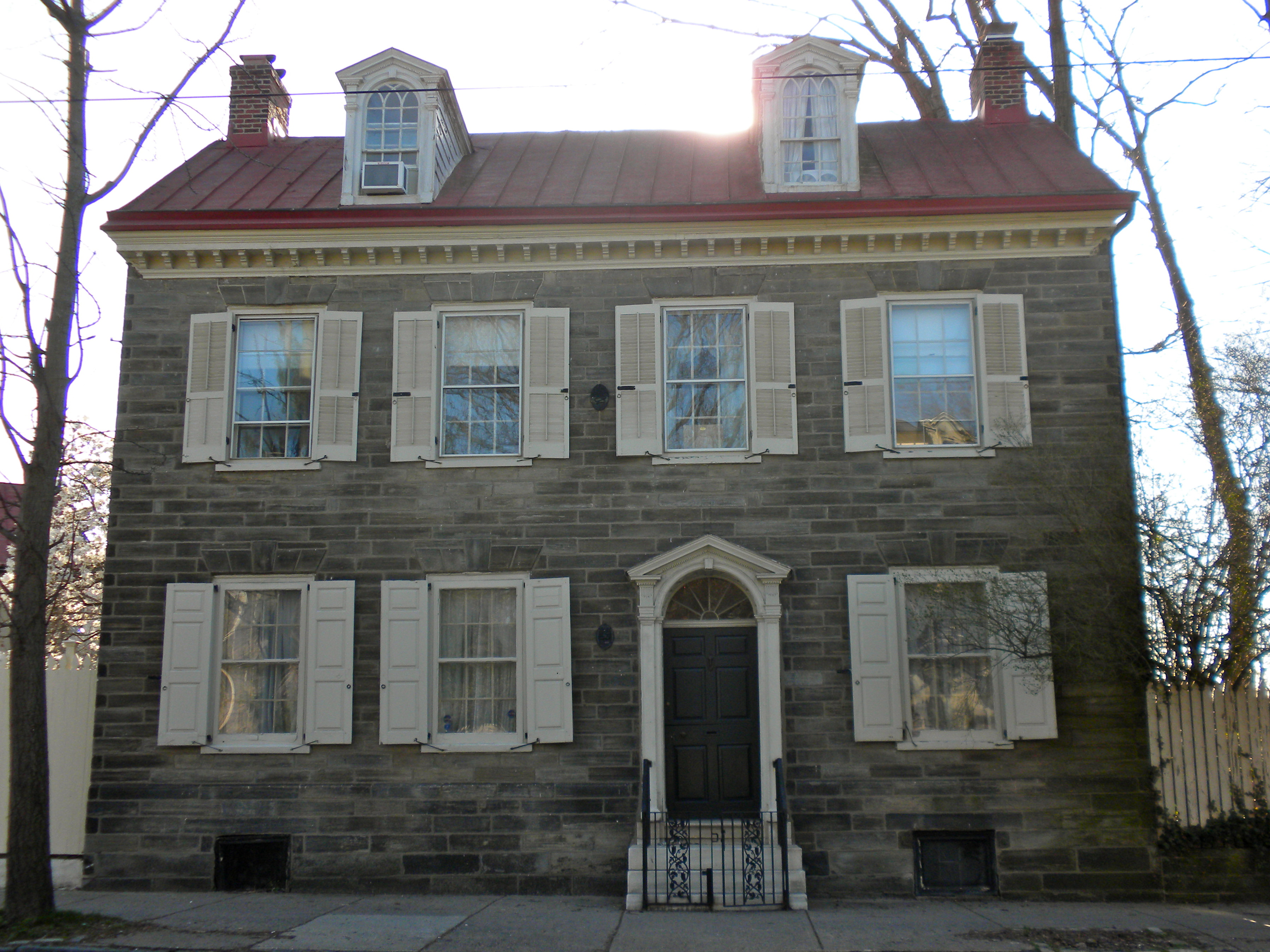

- Location within Philadelphia Location within Pennsylvania Location within the United States
- Location: 6504 Germantown Ave. Philadelphia, Pennsylvania
- Coordinates: 40°2′55″N 75°11′3″W
- Area: less than one acre
- Built: 1793
- Architectural style: Federal
- NRHP reference No.: 71000719
- Added to NRHP: December 13, 1971

The Daniel Billmeyer House is a historic house in the Mount Airy section of Philadelphia, Pennsylvania. The 1793 section of the house was built by printer and wealthy businessman Michael Billmeyer for his son Daniel.

The house was built in two sections. The first was built c. 1730 and was occupied by British troops during the Battle of Germantown. A major focus of this battle was the larger house Cliveden, one block to the southeast, which was also occupied by British troops. The second section of the house, which is visible from Germantown Avenue, was built in 1793 during the yellow fever epidemic.

During the later part of the nineteenth century architect Walter Cope lived in the house.

The house was added to the National Register of Historic Places in 1971. It is a contributing property of the Colonial Germantown Historic District. The Michael Billmeyer House, located across the street, is also listed on the NRHP.
