= Loudoun Mansion =

Historic house in Pennsylvania, United States

- U.S. National Historic Landmark District – Contributing property
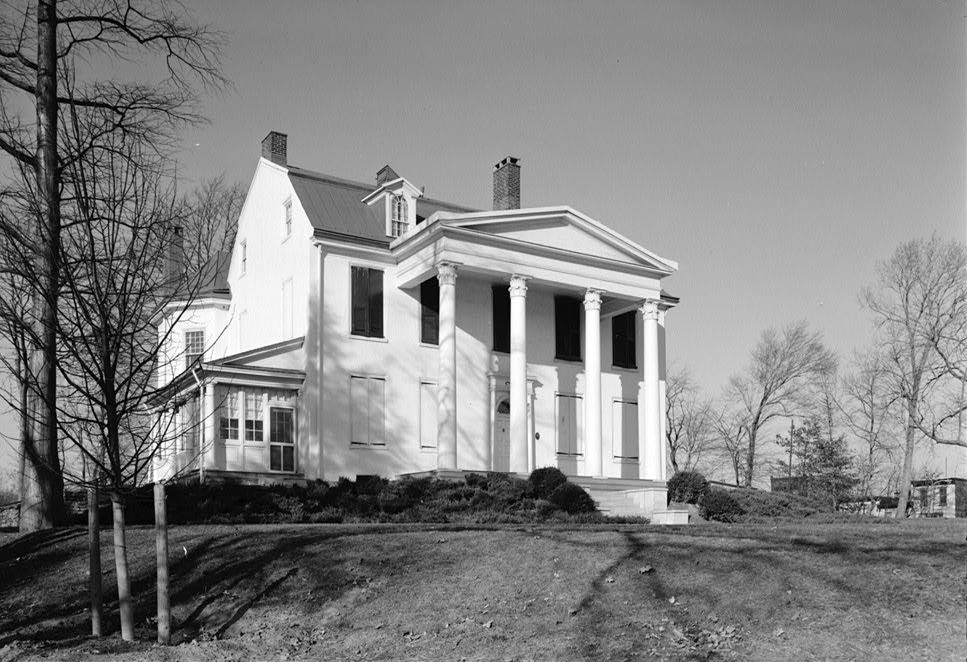

- Location within Pennsylvania
- Location: 4650 Germantown Ave. Philadelphia, Pennsylvania
- Coordinates: 40°1′34″N 75°9′36″W
- Built: 1801
- Architectural style: Federal, Greek Revival

The Loudoun Mansion is an historic house in the Germantown neighborhood of Philadelphia, Pennsylvania, United States.

A contributing property of the Colonial Germantown Historic District, it was damaged by fire in 1993 and is not open to the public.

== History and architectural features ==
An example of Federal-style and Greek-revival architecture, the main structure was built by Thomas Armat in 1801 and expanded in 1810. The Greek portico was built in 1830. The house stands on one of the highest Native American Mounds (the Lenni Lenape) overlooking Philadelphia and the Delaware River from Germantown. During and after the Battle of Germantown many wounded soldiers were carried to the top of the hill where Loudoun now stands.

The house was donated to the City of Philadelphia in 1939. The house is a contributing property of the Colonial Germantown Historic District. It was badly damaged by a fire in 1993 and is not open to the public.

== In popular culture ==
It is alluded to significantly throughout the novel Loving Day by the African American novelist Mat Johnson.

== Gallery ==
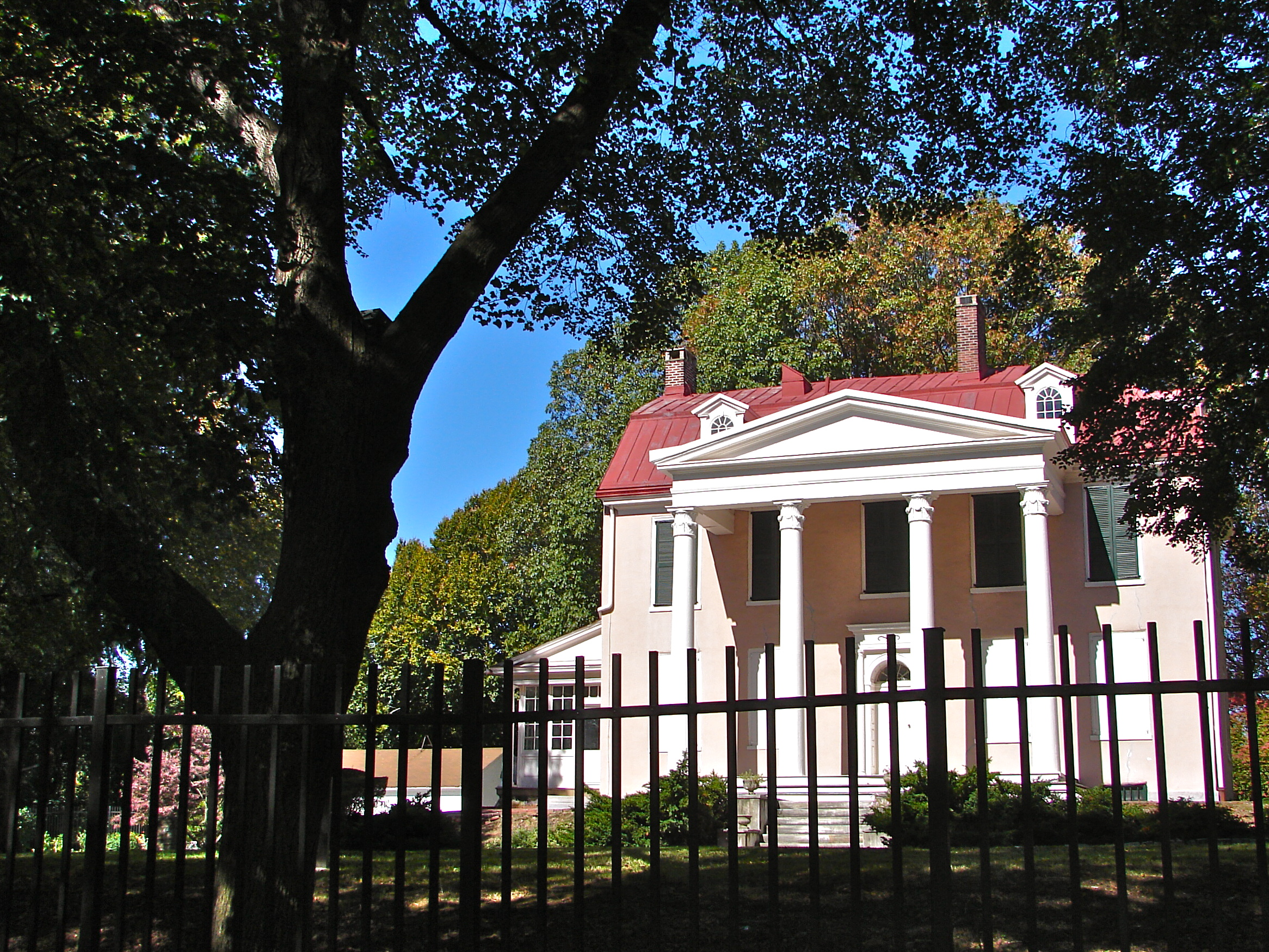
Mansion view from the south
