= Michael Billmeyer House =

Historic house in Pennsylvania, United States

- U.S. National Register of Historic Places
- U.S. National Historic Landmark District – Contributing property
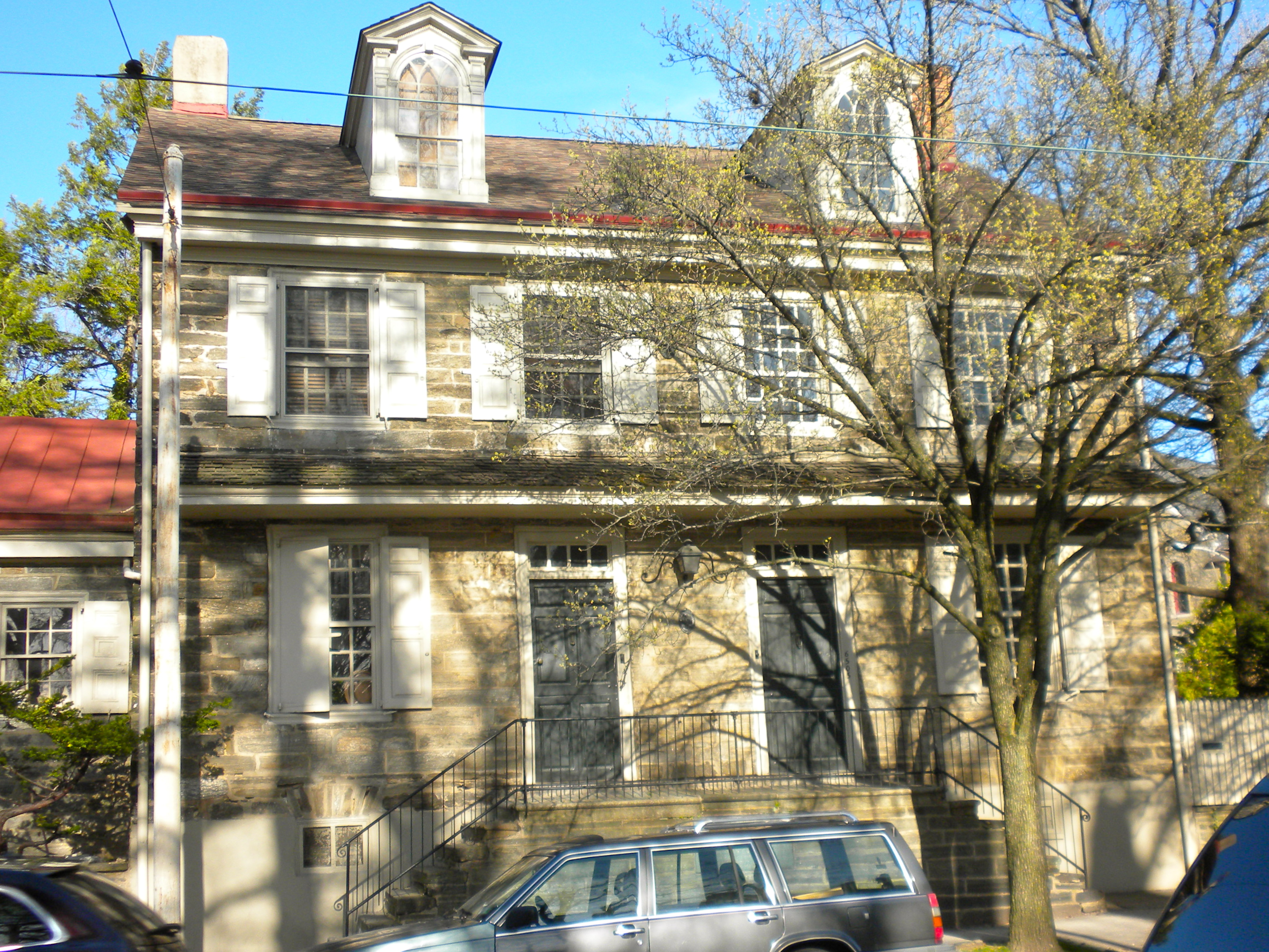

- Location within Philadelphia Location within Pennsylvania Location within the United States
- Location: 6505–6507 Germantown Ave., Philadelphia, Pennsylvania
- Coordinates: 40°2′54″N 75°11′2″W
- Area: less than one acre
- Built: 1730
- NRHP reference No.: 72001145
- Added to NRHP: January 13, 1972

The Michael Billmeyer House, aka the Bensell-Billmeyer House, is an historic twin house in the Mount Airy section of Philadelphia, Pennsylvania, United States.

The house was added to the National Register of Historic Places in 1972. It is a contributing property of the Colonial Germantown Historic District.

== History and architectural features ==
Built circa 1730 by John George Bensell, it was purchased in 1789 by Michael Billmeyer, the noted printer of Germantown. It is said that it was from this house that General George Washington directed the Continental forces in the Battle of Germantown against the British stronghold at Cliveden.

The house was added to the National Register of Historic Places in 1972. It is a contributing property of the Colonial Germantown Historic District. The Daniel Billmeyer House, located across the street, was built by Michael for his son in 1793 and is also listed on the NRHP.
