= Colonial Germantown Historic District =

Historic district in Pennsylvania, United States

- U.S. National Register of Historic Places
- U.S. National Historic Landmark District
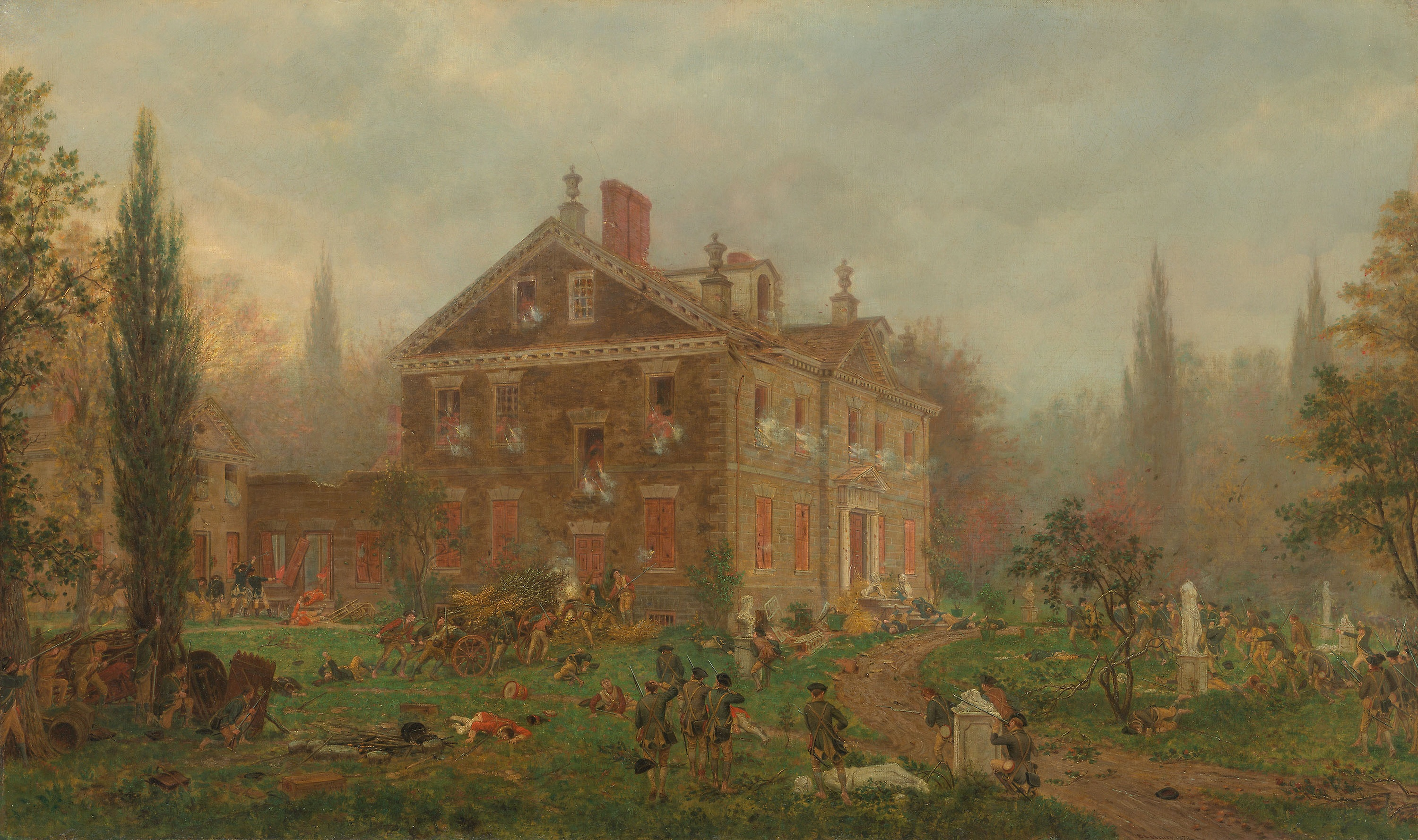

- Location within Philadelphia Location within Pennsylvania Location within the United States
- Location: Both sides of Germantown Avenue, between Windrim Avenue and Sharpnack Street; Philadelphia, Pennsylvania
- Area: 113 acres (46 ha)
- Built: 1683
- Architect: Multiple
- Architectural style: Colonial, Georgian, Federal
- NRHP reference No.: 66000678

Significant dates
- Added to NRHP: June 23, 1965
- Designated NHLD: June 23, 1965

The Colonial Germantown Historic District is a designated National Historic Landmark District in the Germantown and Mount Airy neighborhoods of Philadelphia, Pennsylvania along both sides of Germantown Avenue. This road followed a Native American path from the Delaware River just north of Old City Philadelphia, through Germantown, about 6 miles northwest of Center City Philadelphia, and on to Pottstown. Settlement in the Germantown area began, at the invitation of William Penn, in 1683 by Nederlanders and Germans under the leadership of Francis Daniel Pastorius fleeing religious persecution.

Colonial Germantown was a leader in religious thought, printing, and education. Important dates in Germantown's early history include:

- August 16, 1683, Pastorius arrives in Philadelphia
- October 25, 1683, Lots are drawn for land among Pastorius's followers and settlement begins
- 1688, first American anti-slavery protest published
- 1690, first paper-mill built in America is built near Germantown
- 1705, possibly the first portrait painted in oil in America painted by Christopher Witt in Germantown
- 1708, first Mennonite Meetinghouse in America built in Germantown
- 1719, first Dunkards in America arrive in Germantown
- 1743, first Bible printed in America in any European language (in this case German), printed by Christoph Sauer
- 1760, Germantown Academy founded
- February 1764, the Paxton Boys enter Germantown but disperse after meeting with a delegation headed by Benjamin Franklin
- 1770, first American book on pedagogy written by Christopher Dock and published in Germantown
- October 4, 1777, Battle of Germantown
- 1793, during the Philadelphia Yellow Fever Epidemic, President Washington and his cabinet move to Germantown
- 1794, Washington spends two months in Germantown to avoid the heat in Philadelphia
- July 20, 1825, General Lafayette visits Germantown
- June 6, 1832, railroad from Philadelphia to Germantown opens

== Historic designation and extent ==
The district was designated a National Historic Landmark in 1965 and was added to the National Register of Historic Places in 1966. The original district included the 4500 to 6600 blocks of Germantown Avenue (between Windrim Avenue and Sharpnack Street). In 1987 the district was expanded north to the 7600 block of Germantown Avenue (up to Cresheim Valley Drive), which is the southern boundary of the Chestnut Hill Historic District. The district's two parts contain 579 properties, of which 514 are considered contributing, and only 65 non-contributing. The northwest Philadelphia area, which promotes itself as "Freedom's Backyard," contains 11 historic districts listed by the National Register of Historic Places, as well as 58 separately listed properties. Eight state historical markers are located on Germantown Avenue. Nearly complete inventories prepared for the National Register of Historic Places, both for the original district and for the expanded area are available. A 1907 inventory of historic buildings in the area was printed in the "History of Old Germantown."

== Selected contributing properties ==
Contributing properties in the district include the following. Even street numbers are on the west side of Germantown Avenue, odd numbers on the east. Original construction dates may be approximate. Many properties have been recorded by the Historic American Buildings Survey, as indicated in the table below.

Name	Image	Address	Date	Note	HABS No.
Loudoun Mansion		4650 Germantown Ave. 40.0256°N 75.1607°W	1801	Built by Thomas Armat, additions 1829, 1850, 1888, rehab 1864. Stucco on rubble with wood trim. Federal style.	PA-1705
C. W. Schaeffer Public School		4701 Germantown Ave. 40.0267°N 75.1605°W	1876	Listed separately on NRHP. Three stories in stone with wood trim. Designed by L. Esler in the Italianate style.	
Mehl House		4821 Germantown Ave. 40.0280°N 75.1615°W	1744	Stone with wood trim in the Federal style. Brick ell built in 1933.	PA-1706
Ottinger House		4825 Germantown Ave. 40.0281°N 75.1616°W	1748	Colonial and Federal styles.	
Lower Burial Ground		4901–21 Germantown Ave. 40.0289°N 75.1621°W	1692	Now called Hood Cemetery. Baroque Revival style entry gate designed in 1849 by William L. Johnston.	PA-1697
Baynton House		5208 Germantown Ave. 40.0310°N 75.1677°W	1798	Two and one-half stories. Brick with stone and wood trim in the Federal style.	PA-1694-A
Conyngham-Hacker House		5214 Germantown Ave.	1796	Listed separately on the NRHP. Two and one-half stories. Stone with wood trim in the Federal style.	PA-1694-B
Howell House		5218 Germantown Ave.	1798	Listed separately on the NRHP. Built for William Forbes. Two and one-half stories. Stone with wood trim in the Federal style.	PA-1694-C
Theobald Endt House		5222 Germantown Ave.	1730; Rebuilt 1802	AKA Handsberry House; built by Theobald Endt. Two and one-half stories. Stucco on stone with wood trim in the Federal style.	
Bechtel House		5226 Germantown Ave.	1730; Rebuilt 1802	Once the home of Rev. John Bechtel. Two and one-half stories. Stone with wood trim in the Colonial style.	
Grumblethorpe		5267 Germantown Ave. 40.0322°N 75.1683°W	1744	Listed separately on NRHP. Additions in 1750, 1799, 1806, 1819. Owned by John Wister, an important site during the Battle of Germantown. Stone with wood trim in the Colonial style.	PA-7-1
Wistar's Tenant House		5269 Germantown Ave.	1745	Listed separately on NRHP. Addition in early nineteenth century. Stone with wood trim in Colonial style.	PA-7-6
Clarkson–Watson House		5275 Germantown Ave. 40.0322°N 75.1689°W	1745	Additions/alterations in 1775, 1825, 1870, 1910. Stucco on stone with wood trim in Federal style/Colonial style.	PA-1681
Germantown Friends School and Meeting House		5400 Germantown Ave. 40.0325°N 75.1719°W	1869	Meeting founded 1690. This parcel acquired 1693 and used as a burial ground. Previous meeting houses built 1705, 1812. School founded 1845. Several school buildings on site.	PA-6654
Masonic Temple of Germantown		5423–27 Germantown Ave.	1873	Additions/alterations 1915, 1920. Three stories, stone with wood trim in the Gothic Revival style A previous house on this site was the birthplace of Louisa May Alcott.	
Germantown White House; Deshler–Morris House		5442 Germantown Ave. 40.0338°N 75.1718°W	1772	Listed separately on the NRHP. Additions/alterations 1840, 1856, 1868, 1887, 1898, 1909. Headquarters of General Sir William Howe during October 4, 1777 Battle of Germantown. Temporary residence of President George Washington, November 1793 (yellow fever epidemic), and Summer 1794. Stucco on stone with wood trim in the Federal style.	PA-1683
National Bank of Germantown		5500–04 Germantown Ave. 40.0343°N 75.1730°W	1868	J. C. Sidney original architect. Additions/alterations 1890, 1907, 1930. Stone with wood trim in the Renaissance Revival style.	
John Fromberger House		5501 Germantown Ave. 40.0345°N 75.1719°W	1796	Multiple renovations; now houses the Germantown Historical Society. Brick with stone and wood trim in the Federal style.	PA-1690
S. S. Kresge Store		5549-53 Germantown Ave. 40.0350°N 75.1734°W		Georgian Revival style	
Loyal Order of Odd Fellows		5615 Germantown Ave. 40.0356°N 75.1741°W	1860	New facade 1940. Three stories in brick with stone and pressed metal in the Georgian Revival style.	
C. A. Rowell Department Store		5627 Germantown Ave.	1949	Rear section originally Germantown Trust (1929). Georgian Revival style by architect Herbert Beidler.	
First Presbyterian Church in Germantown		5700 block Germantown Ave. (35 West Chelten Ave.); 40.035°N 75.1754°W	1871+	Attributed to architect T. Roney Williamson, Richardson Romanesque style	
Vernon-Wister House		5708 Germantown Ave. 40.0357°N 75.1766°W	1803	Federal style, purchased by John Wister, grandson of Wister at Grumblethorpe	PA-7-2
Vernon Park branch The Free Library of Philadelphia		5818 Germantown Ave. 40.0365°N 75.1764°W	1907	Now housing the Center in the Park.org. A Carnegie Library; designed by Frank Miles Day & Brother	PA-6752
Germantown Town Hall		5928–30 Germantown Ave.		Never actually served as the town hall	PA-6708
Wyck House		6026 Germantown Ave. 40.0399°N 75.1785°W	1690 (part)	Listed separately as a National Historic Landmark. 1824: remodeled by William Strickland	PA-7-3
Mennonite Meetinghouse		6119 Germantown Ave. 40.0413°N 75.1791°W	1770	Listed separately on the NRHP. Congregation established in 1688 as first Mennonite church in America. One and one-half stories, stone with wood trim in the Colonial style.	PA-15
John Johnson House		6306 Germantown Ave.	1768	Listed separately as a National Historic Landmark. A stop on the Underground Railroad. After 1918, home of the Women's Club of Germantown.	PA-7-7
Concord School House		6309 Germantown Ave. 40.0440°N 75.1811°W	1775	Possibly built by Jacob Knor. Two and one-half stories, stone with wood trim.	PA-12
Upper Burial Ground		6311–17 Germantown Ave.	1693	"Axe's Cemetery," land donated by Paul Wolfe, wall built 1777.	
Cliveden		6401 Germantown Ave. 40.0465°N 75.1821°W	1763-67	Listed separately as a National Historic Landmark. Estate of Benjamin Chew, an important site during the Battle of Germantown. Built by William Knor. Two and one-half stories with wood trim in the Colonial style.	PA-1184
Upsala		6430 Germantown Ave. 40.0467°N 75.1832°W	1798	Listed separately on the NRHP. Two and one-half stories with wood trim in the Federal style. Rear sections perhaps built earlier.	PA-1718
Daniel Billmeyer House		6504 Germantown Ave. 40.0484°N 75.1837°W	1793	Listed separately on the NRHP. Stone with wood trim in the Federal style.	
Michael Billmeyer House		6505 Germantown Ave. 40.0485°N 75.1834°W	1727	Listed separately on the NRHP. Stone with wood trim in the Federal and German colonial styles.	PA-1677
Church of the Brethren		6611 Germantown Ave. 40.0501°N 75.1841°W	1770	First Church of the Brethren (Dunkards) in America	
Winston Commons		6620–24 Germantown Ave. 40.0510°N 75.1851°W	1895	Architect William Lightfoot Price	
St. Michael's Lutheran Church in Germantown		6671 Germantown Ave. 40.0521°N 75.1846°W	1896-97	The congregation has used this site at least since 1728 until the church closed in 2016.	
Beggarstown School		6669 Germantown Ave. 40.0514°N 75.1850°W	1740	Listed separately on the NRHP.	PA-1675
Mt. Airy Presbyterian Church		7108 Germantown Ave. 40.0585°N 75.1899°W	1880		
Sedgwick Theater		7133-41 Germantown Ave. 40.0585°N 75.1899°W	1926-1928	Art Deco. William H. Lee architect.	
Tourison Building		7200-06 Germantown Ave. 40.0585°N 75.1899°W	1920s	Art Deco. Tunis and Baker, architects.	
Store		7203 Germantown Ave. 40.0608°N 75.1909°W			
Mt. Airy Agricultural School		7331 Germantown Ave. 40.0614°N 75.1916°W	1792		
Cresheim Cottage		7402-04 Germantown Ave. 40.0626°N 75.1933°W	1804?		
Bockius House		7413 Germantown Ave. 40.0634°N 75.1929°W	1790-1800		

== See also ==
- Awbury Historic District
- Chestnut Hill Historic District
- RittenhouseTown Historic District
- Tulpehocken Station Historic District
- List of National Historic Landmarks in Philadelphia
- National Register of Historic Places listings in Northwest Philadelphia
