= Germantown White House =

Historic house in Pennsylvania, United States

- U.S. National Register of Historic Places
- U.S. National Historic Landmark District – Contributing property
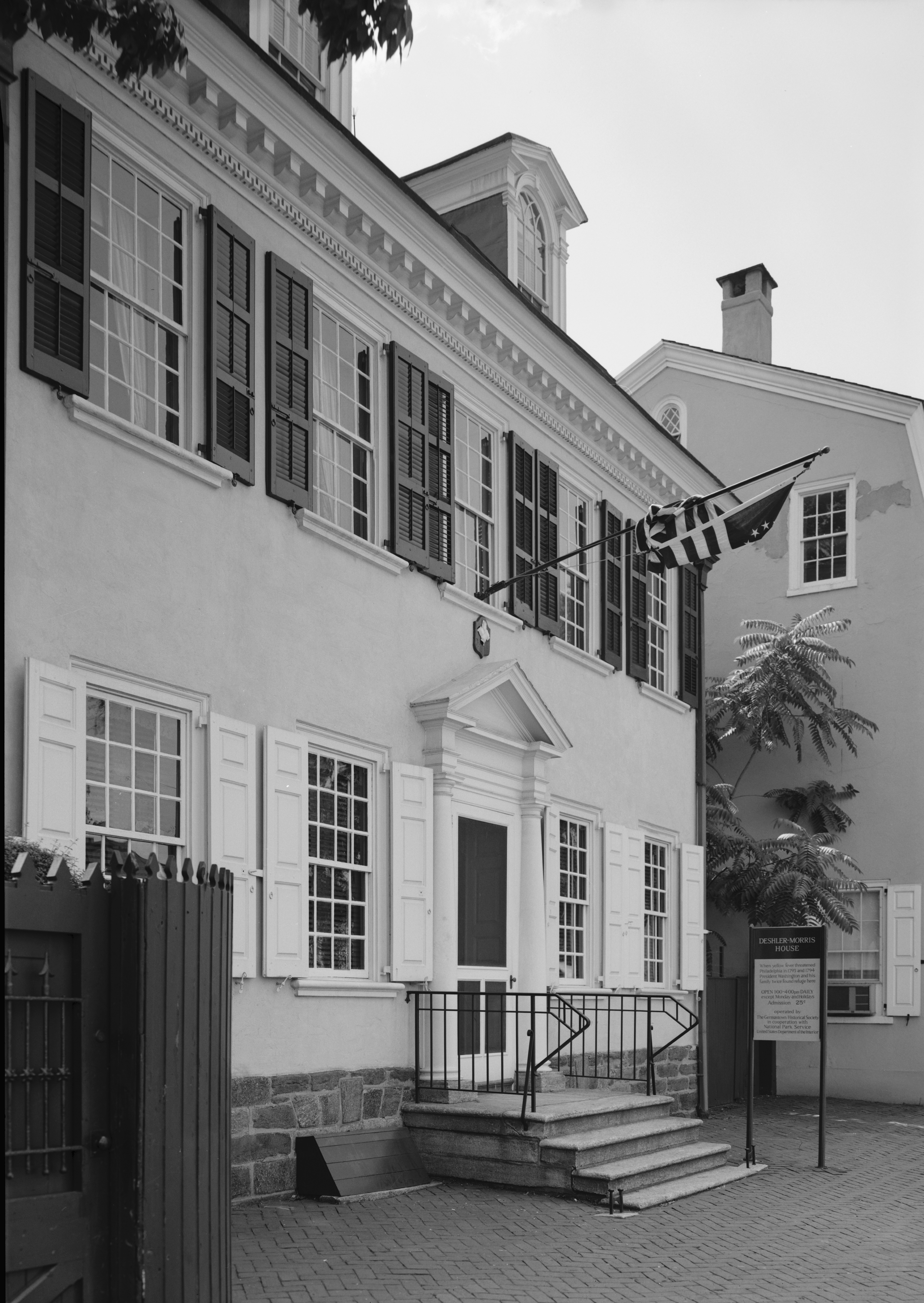

- Location within Philadelphia Location within Pennsylvania Location within the United States
- Location: 5442 Germantown Avenue; Germantown, Philadelphia, Pennsylvania, United States
- Coordinates: 40°2′1.6″N 75°10′18.4″W
- Area: < 1-acre (4,000 m^{2})
- Built: 1752
- Architect: David Deshler
- NRHP reference No.: 72000095
- Added to NRHP: January 13, 1972

The Germantown White House (also known as the Deshler–Morris House) is a historic mansion in the Germantown section of Philadelphia, Pennsylvania. It is the oldest surviving presidential residence, having twice housed Founding Father George Washington during his presidency.

== Construction and ownership ==
The house's alternate name comes from its second and last owners: David Deshler, who built it beginning in 1752; and Elliston P. Morris, Jr., who donated it to the National Park Service in 1948.

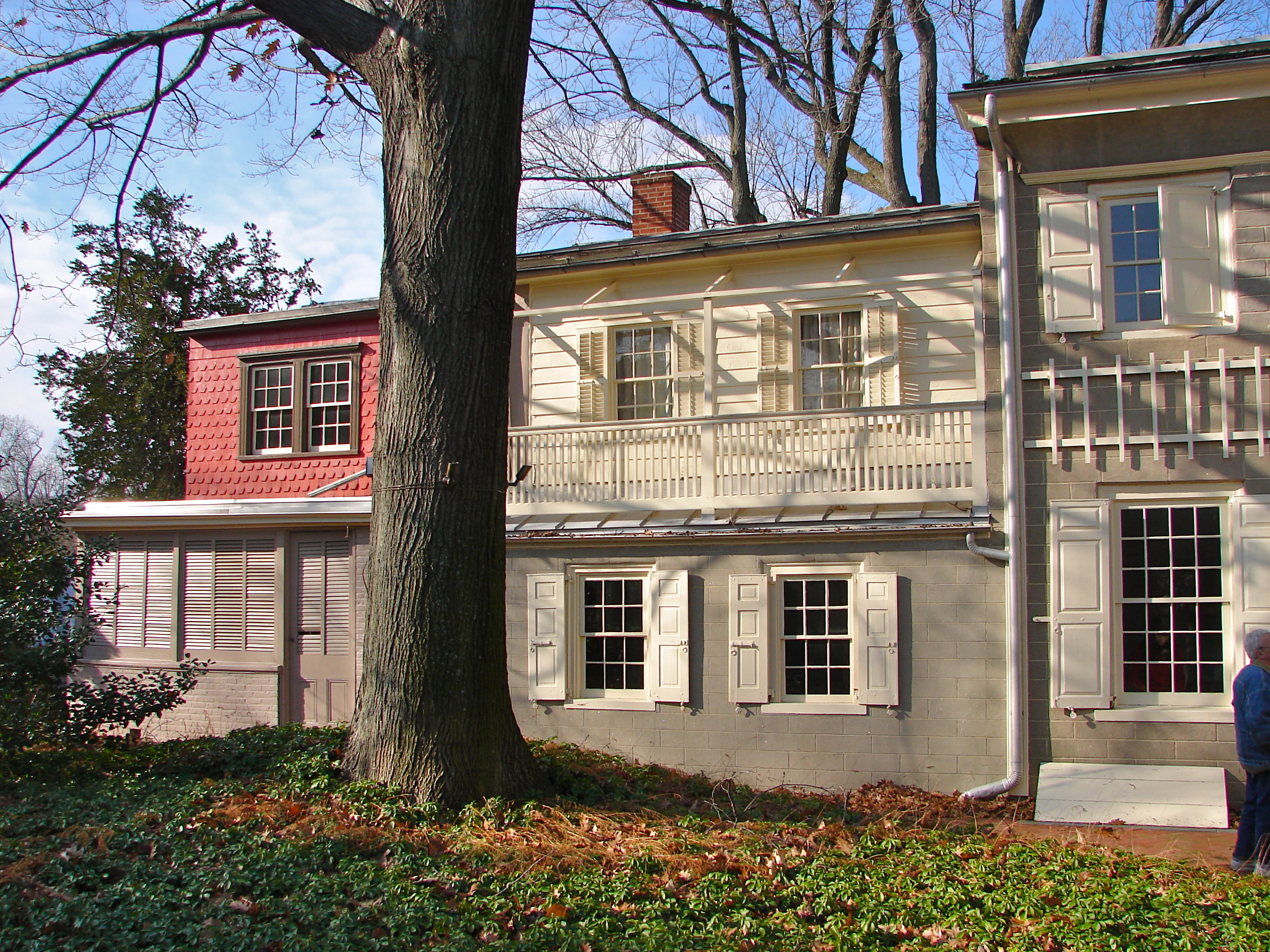
The rear of the house shows the earliest construction.

George and Anna (née Ashmead)Bringhurst built a four-room residence on the lot in 1751–52. David Deshler acquired the residence, and in 1772, he built a 3-story, 9-room addition to the front, creating one of the most elegant homes in the region.

Isaac Franks, a former colonel in the Continental Army, bought the house following Deshler's 1792 death. It was he who rented it to President Washington.

Later, the house was sold to Elliston and John Perot, and in 1834 to Elliston's son-in-law, Samuel B. Morris. The Morris family lived in the house for over a hundred years, before its 1948 donation to the National Park Service.

== History ==
=== Revolutionary War ===
On October 4, 1777, it was a scene of fighting in the Battle of Germantown, after which British General Sir William Howe occupied the house.

=== 1793 ===
When the Yellow Fever Epidemic of 1793 struck Philadelphia, President Washington remained in the city until September, before making his regular autumn trip home to Mount Vernon. He and a small group of slaves returned in early November, but Philadelphia was under quarantine and they were rerouted to Germantown, then ten miles (16 km) outside the city.

He first occupied the Dove House, the headmaster's residence for Germantown Academy (now extensively altered and part of Pennsylvania School for the Deaf). He also traveled to Reading, Pennsylvania, 60 miles (97 km) northwest of the city, to see if it would make a suitable emergency capital.

Returning to Germantown, from November 16 to 30, he occupied the Isaac Franks house. His wife Martha, two of her grandchildren, Eleanor Parke Custis and George Washington Parke Custis, and more of their slaves and staff joined him late in the stay.

=== 1794 ===
The following September and October, Washington and his family returned to the Franks house for vacation, although he left early to deal with the Whiskey Rebellion in Western Pennsylvania. He met there four times with his cabinet: Secretary of State Thomas Jefferson, Secretary of Treasury Alexander Hamilton, Attorney General Edmund Randolph, and Secretary of War Henry Knox. The President posed for painter Gilbert Stuart, who kept a studio nearby, and the family attended the German Reformed Church across the square.

Four slaves were held by the Washingtons at the Franks house: Oney Judge, Austin (her brother), Moll, and Hercules.

== Preservation ==
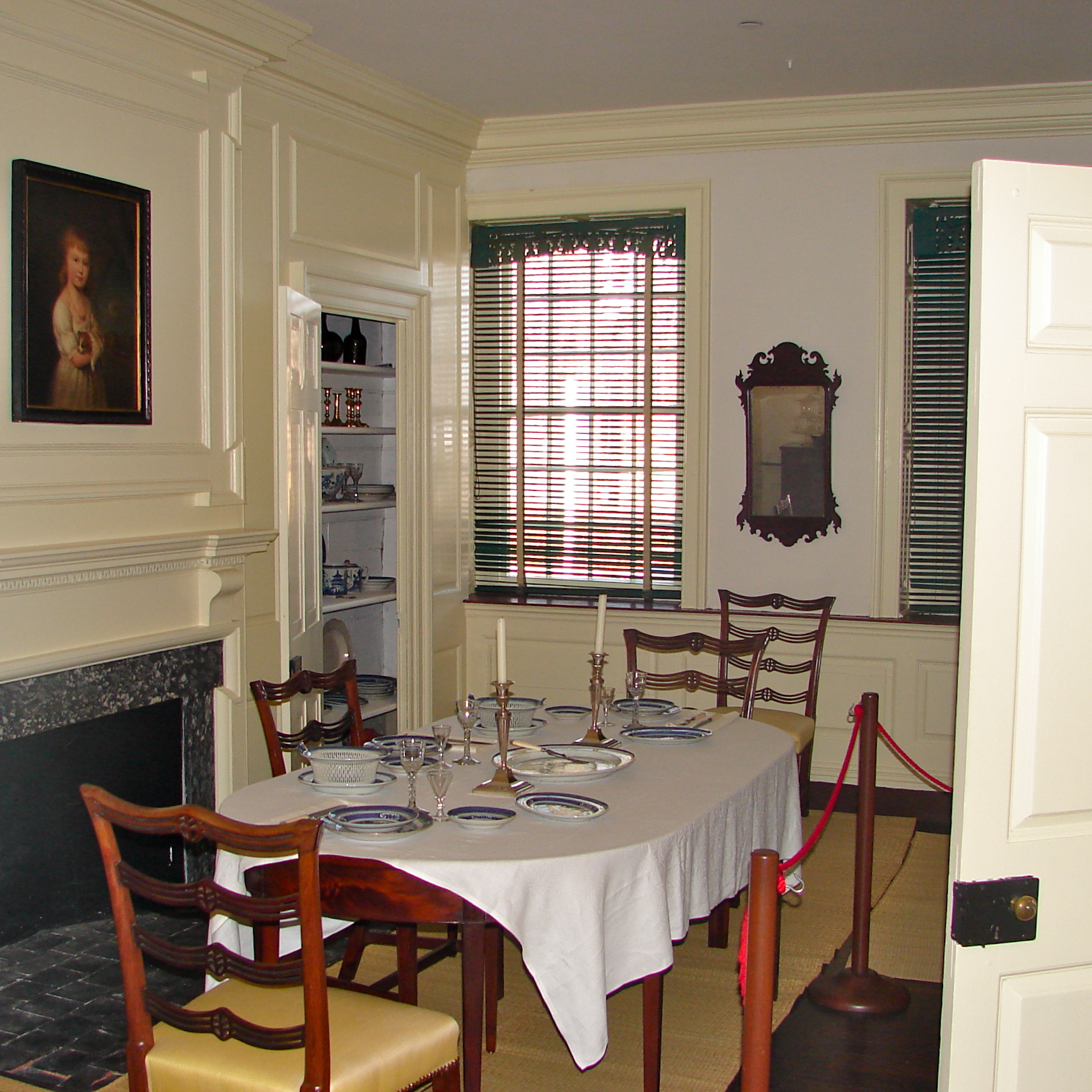
Restored second floor dining room

The house is administered by Independence National Historical Park. In 1972, the house was listed on the National Register of Historic Places. The house is also a contributing property of the Colonial Germantown Historic District. In 2009, the National Park Service changed the official name of the house from the "Deshler-Morris House" to the "Germantown White House."

== Bringhurst House ==
The Bringhurst House, neighboring the Germantown White House on the northwest, was originally owned by John Bringhurst (February 19, 1725 – March 18, 1795), a carriage builder and inventor of the Germantown Wagon; in 1780 he built a carriage for George Washington. His estate consisted of 19 acres (7.7 ha) in Germantown, and was eventually split up by his heirs. Today, near the current historic site, Bringhurst Street is a street named after him which lies on the edge of his former land.

Lieutenant Colonel John Bird was lying sick in the Bringhurst House when the American army attacked on the morning of October 4, 1777. Bird arose from bed to lead his men, but was mortally wounded in the battle. Although a surgeon tried to treat him in Melchoir Meng's house situated on what is now a part of Vernon Park, he was carried back to the Bringhurst House, where he died.

In 1973, the Bringhurst house was donated to the National Park Service from the Germantown Savings Bank in order to "assure access, light, and air for the historic structure". The Bringhurst property is currently in the process of conversion into an exhibition space and welcome center for the Germantown White House landscape.

== See also ==
- President's House (Philadelphia), Washington's executive mansion, 1790–1797
- List of residences of presidents of the United States
- Oney Judge, enslaved maid of Martha Washington
- Hercules (chef), enslaved cook for Washington's presidential household
- Tobias Lear V, Washington's secretary
- Wyck House
