= Western Pennsylvania School for Blind Children =

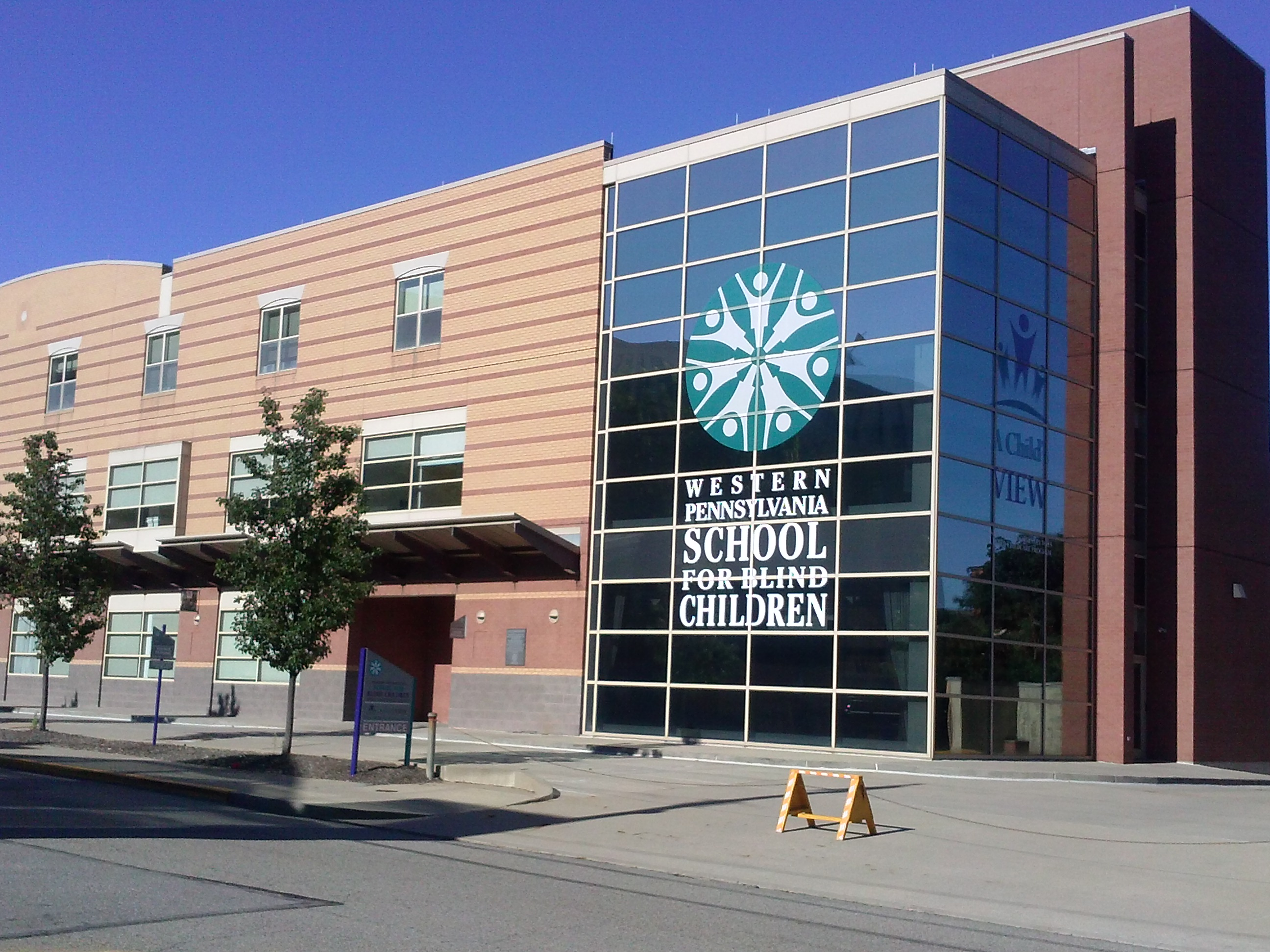

Location
- 201 North Bellefield Avenue; Pittsburgh, Allegheny County, Pennsylvania, 15213; United States; 40.449806°N 79.953088°W

Information
- Established: 1887
- Website: www.wpsbc.org

Western Pennsylvania School for Blind Children (WPSBC) is a private chartered school in Pittsburgh, Pennsylvania for individuals with blindness and visual impairment. It serves nearly 500 individuals ages 3 to 59 from 33 counties through on-campus school programs, A Child’s VIEW inclusive childcare, LAVI adult program, residential program and outreach services.

WPSBC is one of four chartered schools in Pennsylvania– along with the Pennsylvania School for the Deaf, the Overbrook School for the Blind and the Western Pennsylvania School for the Deaf.

== History ==
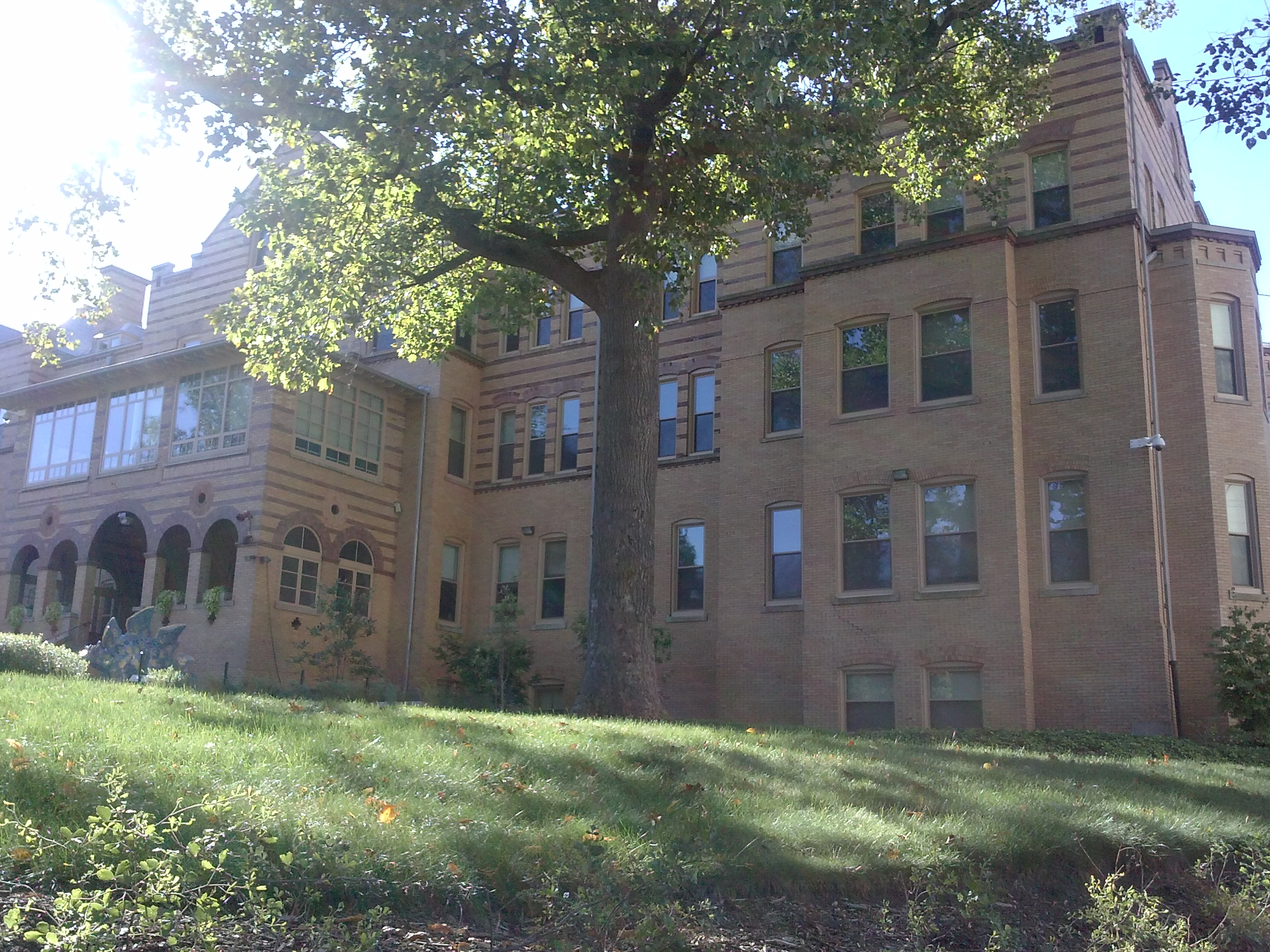
Residential facility on campus

The Western Pennsylvania School for Blind Children (WPSBC) was chartered in 1887 by people who saw the need for children who are blind to receive specialized education and vocational opportunities. In 1894, the group built a permanent home for their school in the Oakland neighborhood of Pittsburgh. At first, the School offered three distinct curricula: academic, commercial and industrial.

As theories about educating individuals with visual impairments changed, the School stayed in the forefront of new practices. For example, when orientation and mobility instruction was introduced, the School quickly began to teach travel with a cane. Technological advances — from the Optacon print reading device and Kurzweil reading machine to recently developed computer learning tools and assistive technologies — have always been welcomed and integrated into the curriculum.

In 1984, after intense study and discussion, the School began to reorient the educational programs to serve the unique abilities of many individuals throughout western Pennsylvania with individualized and compassionate programming, filling a need that was not adequately served elsewhere. Now, the Western Pennsylvania School for Blind Children offers a model program with integrated education and therapy to provide students with unique opportunities for growth and development. In 2003, the School opened its Early Childhood Center, which was uniquely designed for working with young people of all abilities.

Outreach efforts — which began in 1981 with early intervention programming for infants and toddlers — were expanded exponentially in 2008 to include programs for school-aged students with visual impairment that attend their local school.

The beginning of the 2011–12 school year saw the establishment of continued services for adults ages 21 and over with a program called Learning Adventures for the Visually Impaired (LAVI).

In 2012, the School embarked on an initiative to serve infants and toddlers through an inclusive childcare program. A Child's VIEW: Vision In Extraordinary Ways offers comprehensive childcare opportunities, for both children who are and are not visually impaired, from the ages of six weeks to five years.

The 2017–18 school year was marked by the addition of the campus Sky Bridge, which crosses over busy North Bellefield Avenue. This new campus connection created a safer, time-saving route between buildings for students, staff and visitors, providing complete accessibility to all parts of the campus.

== See also ==
- Eric Kloss
