= Ida Gray Hampton =

American educator

Ida Wynette Gray Hampton is an educator who specializes in working with deaf students with multiple disabilities. She was the first Black deaf women to graduate from Gallaudet University in Washington, D.C.

== Education ==
Hampton graduated from Western Pennsylvania School for the Deaf in Edgewood, Pennsylvania in 1951.

She earned a Bachelor's in Education from Gallaudet University in 1957 making her the first Black deaf woman to graduate from the school. Hampton went on to earn a Master's in Special Education from the University of North Florida.

In 2018, Gallaudet awarded her a Doctor of Humane Letters.

== Career ==
Hampton was a teacher at the Florida School for the Deaf.
