= Overbrook School for the Blind =

School for the blind in Philadelphia

Coordinates: 39.982932°N 75.248853°W

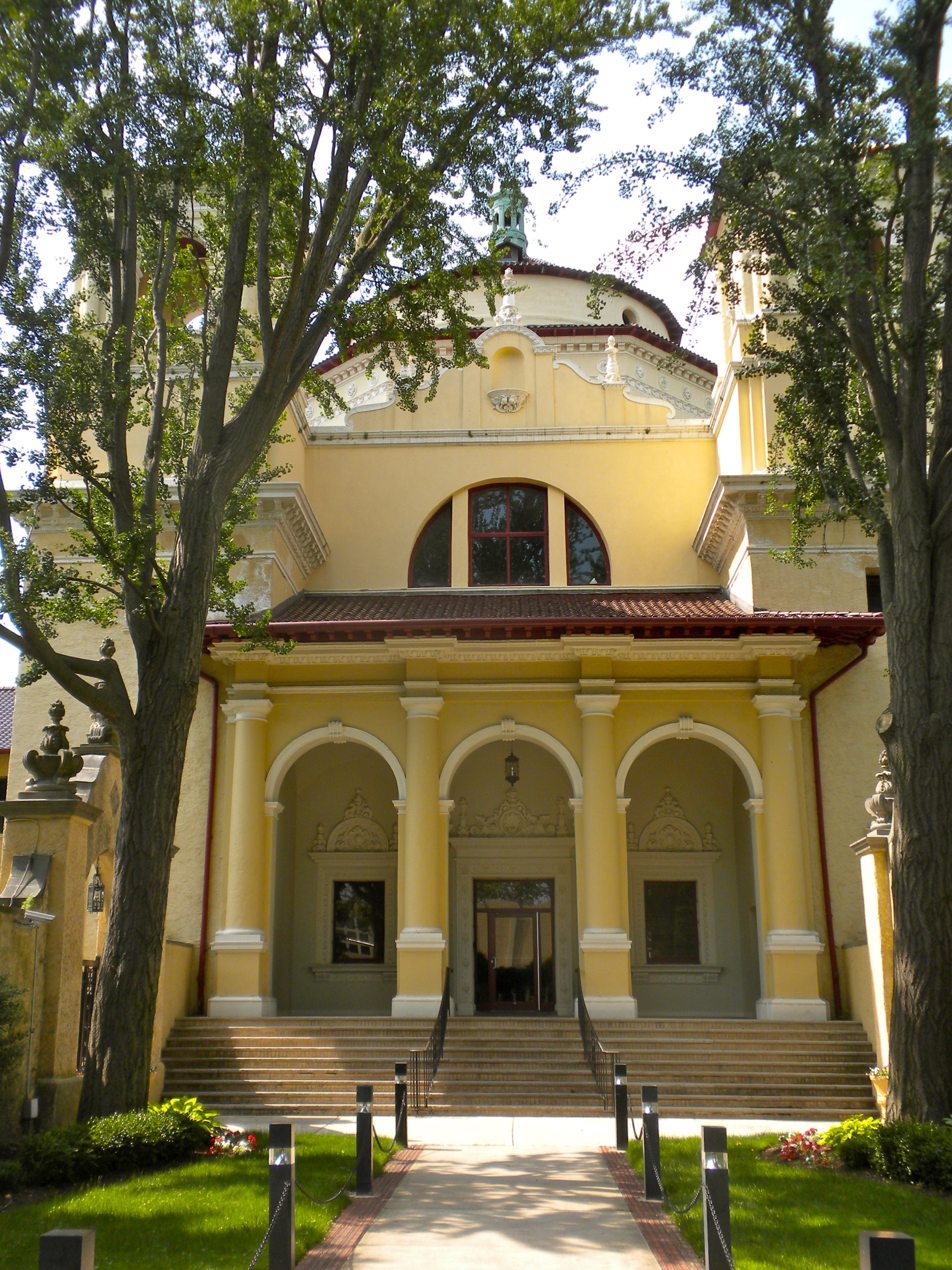

Location
- 6333 Malvern Ave; Philadelphia, Pennsylvania 19151; United States

Information
- Former name: Pennsylvania Institution for the Instruction of the Blind (until 1946)
- Established: 1832
- Founder: Julius Reinhold Friedlander
- Head of school: Beth Ramella (since 2024)
- Website: obs.org

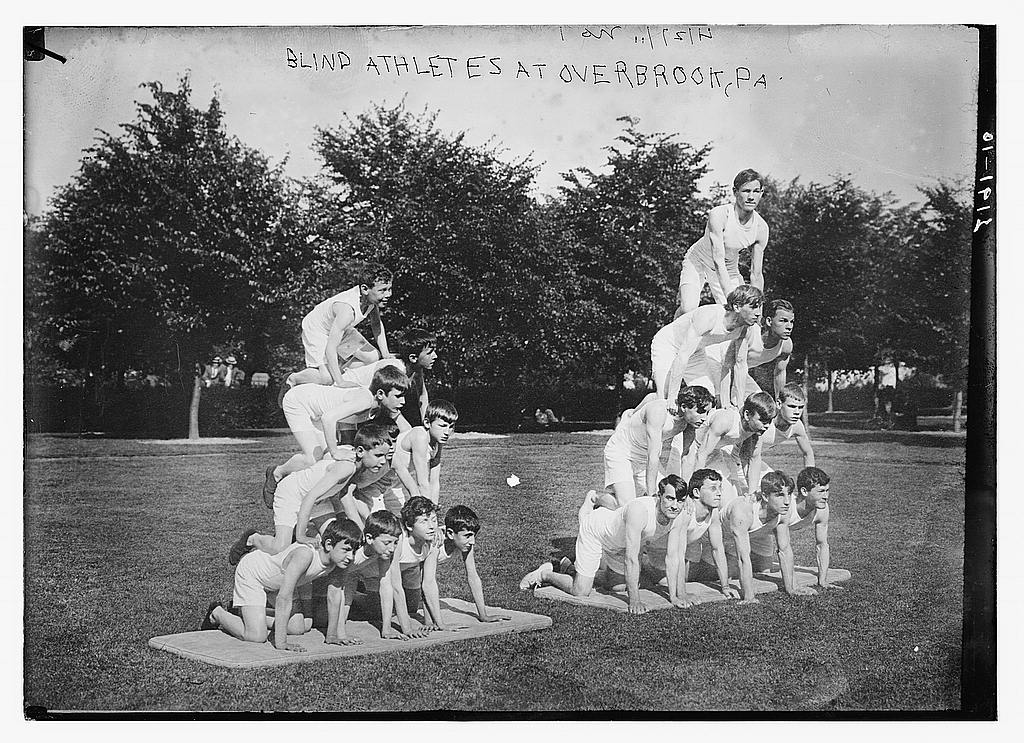
The school in 1911

The Overbrook School for the Blind (OBS) in Philadelphia, Pennsylvania, was established in 1832. Its present site, in the city's Overbrook neighborhood, was acquired in 1890. Along with the Pennsylvania School for the Deaf, the Western Pennsylvania School for Blind Children and the Western Pennsylvania School for the Deaf, it is one of four state-approved charter schools for blind and deaf children in Pennsylvania.

== History ==
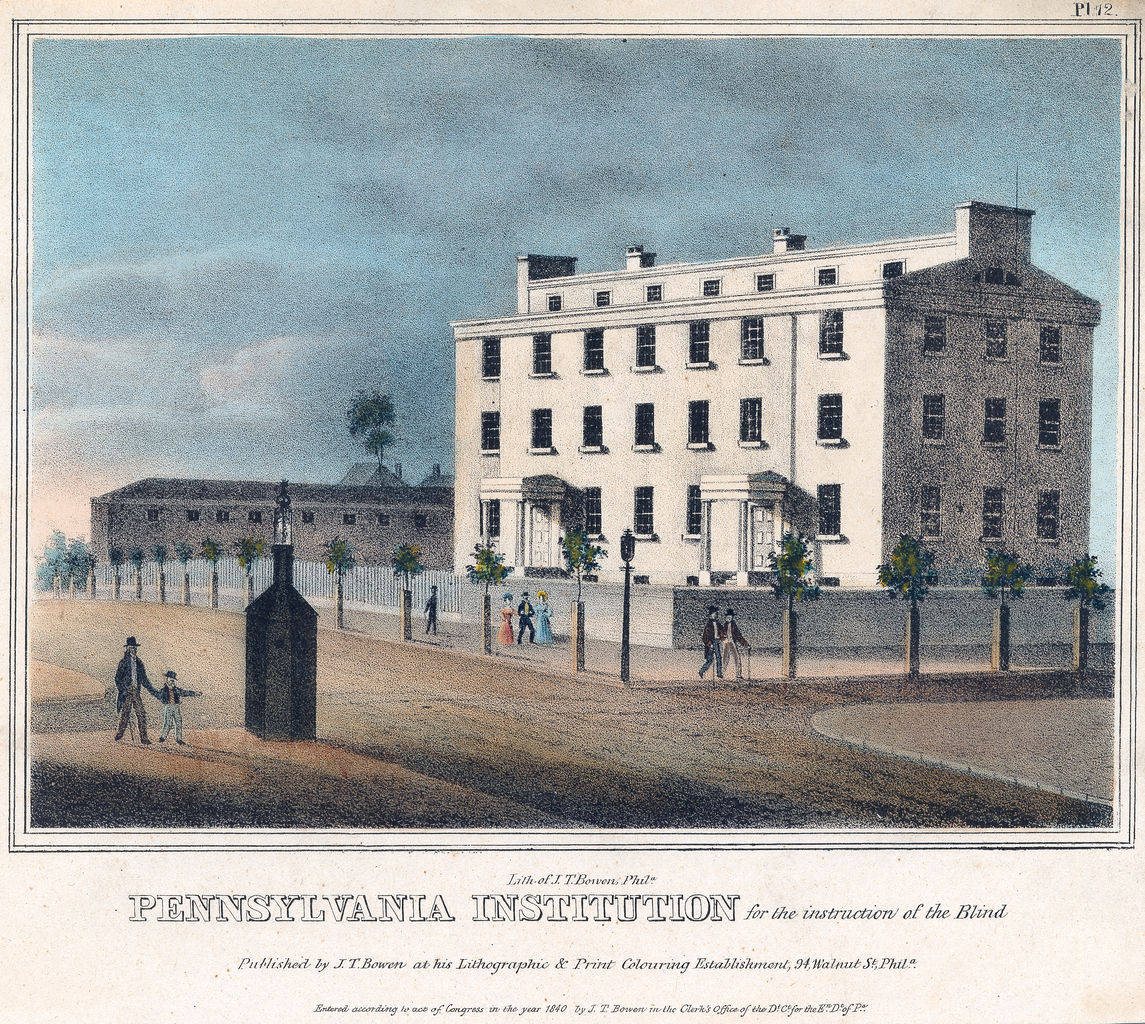
1840 print by John Caspar Wild showing the Twentieth and Race (then Sassafras and Schuylkill Third) Streets building

The Pennsylvania Institution for the Instruction of the Blind opened in March 1832. A few years later, on October 27, 1836, a new building was dedicated on the northwest corner of Schuylkill Third (now Twentieth) and Sassafras (now Race) Streets on what is today the site of the Franklin Institute in the Logan Square neighborhood of Philadelphia.

The school's founder, Julius Reinhold Friedlander, died on 17 March 1837, after years of poor health. At the time of his death, he was less than 36 years old.

During the early 1900s, the school offered athletic programs for its students. In June 1907, the Institution's track and field team defeated their rivals from the Baltimore School for the Blind in the annual intercollegiate competition held between the schools.

That same month, Professor Olin H. Burrit became the new superintendent of the school. He had previously been employed as the superintendent of the New York State School for the Blind.

In December 1907, the school's forty-member choir performed at the dedication of Philadelphia's Grace Baptist Temple.

The school was renamed the Overbrook School for the Blind in 1946, expanding and growing over the next decades. The school building suffered a fire in 1960.

In 2023, the school elected Lyle Sine, a 1977 graduate, as the president of their Board of Trustees, marking the first time a visually-impaired person held the role.

The building began to experience leaks in 2012 and a complete roof replacement was undertaken that same year. The building's Ludowici tiles were replaced with new ones produced by the original manufacturer. In September 17, 2026, the school began an expansion to build a new student cafeteria, commercial kitchen, and an improved bus turnaround.

== International Programs ==
From 1985 to 1999, Overbrook welcomed international visitors to its campus for onsite training programs intended to support their educational work in their home countries. Since then, Overbrook has participated in several overseas outreach initiatives throughout Southeast Asia, Eastern Europe and beyond.

== Notable people ==
=== Students ===
- David Abrahams (b. 2001), American swimmer and paralympian
- Genevieve Caulfield (1888–1972), American teacher and philanthropist
- Sebastian Demanop (1928-2022), Thai-American blind activist
- Matthew A. Dunn (1886–1942), American congressman
- Martha Louise Morrow Foxx (1902–1985), American educator
- Ward Marston (b. 1952), American audio transfer engineer
- Anne V. Ward (1877–1971), Scottish-American educator who both was a student and faculty member of OBS.
- Bob Sine (1958-Present), First visually impaired President of the Board of Trustees at Overbrook.

=== Staff ===
- James G. Blaine (1830–1893), American congressman who taught science and literature at the school in the 1850s
- Robley Dunglison (1798–1869), English-American physician
- Alfred L. Elwyn (1804–1884), American physician, philanthropist, and founding member of the school
- Joshua Francis Fisher (1807–1873), American writer
- Elisabeth Freund (1898–1982), German-Jewish educator who developed a Touch and Learn Center for the school that was a model for other blind centers internationally.
- Julius Reinhold Friedlander (1803–1839), Founder of the school
- Thomas Story Kirkbride (1809–1883), American psychiatrist and Vice President of the school from 1884 until his death
- John Vaughan (1756–1841), American wine merchant and former school President
