= Elisabeth Freund =

German-Jewish educator and writer (1898–1982)

Elisabeth Freund (1898–1982) was a German-Jewish educator and writer. Born in Germany, she emigrated to Cuba in the 1930s and to the US in 1941. Freund developed learning curricula for the blind, and founded a Touch and Learn Center at the Overbrook School for the Blind in Philadelphia in the mid-20th century.

Freund was born in Breslau, Germany (now part of Poland) in 1898 to a neurologist, Carl Freund.

Elisabeth Freund studied at universities in Breslau, Würzburg, and Berlin.

In the 1930s, Elisabeth Freund lived with her husband and children in Berlin. In 1933, her husband was dismissed from his work at a corporation because he was a Jew.

In 1939, Freund and her husband sent their two daughters and one son, ages 11, 14, and 15 through Kindertransport to England. Freund and her husband emigrated to Cuba in 1941 before finally emigrating to the U.S. in 1944.

Freund began working for the Overbrook School for the Blind in Philadelphia, which had been founded more than a century earlier by Julius Friedlaender, the brother of her great-uncle. In 1959, she published a biography of Friedlaender, Crusader for light: Julius R. Friedlander, founder of the Overbrook School for the Blind, 1832,.

Freund developed a Touch and Learn Center at the Overbrook School for the Blind that was a model for other blind centers internationally.

She died in 1982.

== Publications ==
- Freund, Elisabeth D. 1978. Longhand writing for the blind. Louisville, Ky: Printed at the American Printing House for the Blind.
- Freund, Elisabeth D. 1959. Crusader for light: Julius R. Friedlander, founder of the Overbrook School for the Blind, 1832. Philadelphia: Dorrance & Co.
