= Mary Smith Garrett =

Educator of deaf children and child welfare advocate

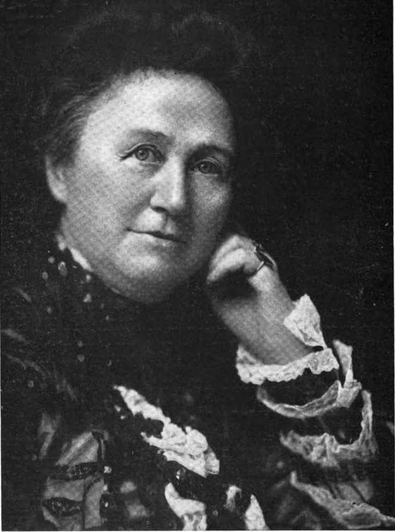
- Born: June 20, 1839; Philadelphia, Pennsylvania
- Died: July 18, 1925
- Occupation: Educator of the Deaf

Mary Smith Garrett (June 20, 1839 – July 18, 1925) was an American deaf educator. She taught at the Pennsylvania Institution for the Deaf and Dumb in Mount Airy, Pennsylvania. In 1885, she opened up her own private school to teach deaf children how to communicate effectively. Following the death of her sister, Emma Garett, she became an advocate of teaching deaf children how to speak and to understand speech through visual observations of vocalization techniques.

== Early life ==
Garrett was born on June 20, 1839, in Philadelphia, Pennsylvania. She was one of at least six children from her parents, Henry Garrett and Caroline Rush Cole Garrett. Not much is known about Garrett's early life. She never married and never had any children of her own.

== Career ==
Garrett did not have any formal training in deaf education. Instead, she was instructed by her sister, Emma Garrett, who gained experience from Alexander Graham Bell.

Garrett started teaching at the Pennsylvania Institution for the Deaf and Dumb in 1881. In 1885, she opened her own private school for the deaf in Philadelphia. She closed her school in 1889 and went to work as a teacher at the Pennsylvania Oral School for Deaf Mutes in Scranton where her sister was both founder and principal.

By 1891, both sisters left Scranton to become founders of the Pennsylvania Home for the Training in Speech of Deaf Children Before They Are of School Age (Bala Home). Emma was the principal and Mary was the secretary. In 1893, the Bala Home was recognized as a state institution and granted a yearly budget for operation.

In the summer of 1893, the sisters had brought their institution to Chicago as a "living exhibit" in the Children's Building of the World's Columbian Exposition. Both sisters stayed in Chicago until Emma took her own life that same year. Mary returned to Philadelphia and took over her sister's position as principal where she would remain until her own death on July 18, 1925.

Garrett was a leading advocate of teaching the deaf to speak and understand speech through lip-reading. She was also a powerful spokeswoman for oralism through her publications, personal appeals to legislators, and speeches she gave to further her cause. Garrett was active in other causes for child welfare. She was successful in obtaining a law to be passed in Pennsylvania that requires all state institutions for deaf children to offer exclusive training by the oral method.

Garrett became vice president of the Pennsylvania Congress of Mothers and a leader in the National Congress of Mothers to become chairman of the Department of Legislation, which prompted child-labor law reforms and juvenile court legislation.
