= Pennsylvania School for the Deaf =

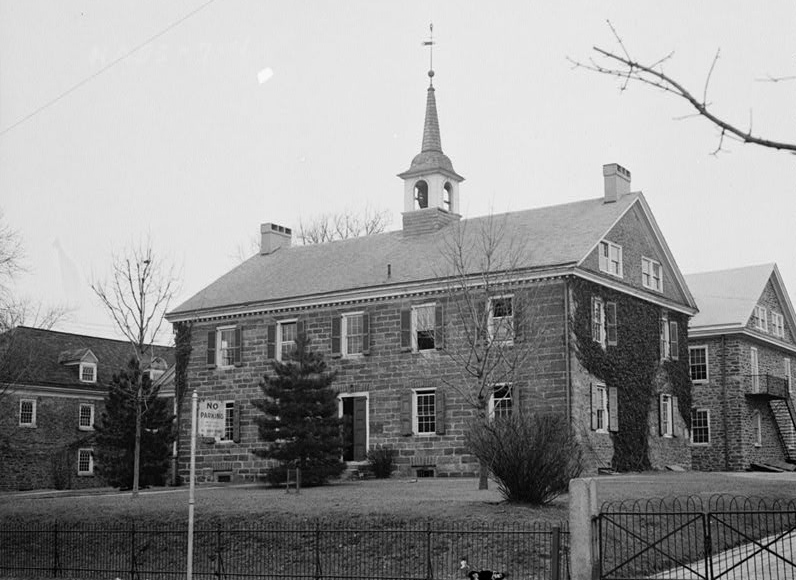
The current campus occupies buildings in the Old Germantown Academy.

The Pennsylvania School for the Deaf is the third-oldest school of its kind in the United States. Its founder, David G. Seixas (1788–1864), was a Philadelphia crockery maker-dealer who became concerned with the plight of impoverished deaf children who he observed on the city's streets. The current school building is listed by the National Register of Historic Places, and two former campuses are similarly recognized.

It is one of four approved chartered schools—along with the Western Pennsylvania School for Blind Children, the Overbrook School for the Blind, the Western Pennsylvania School for the Deaf—in Pennsylvania.

The school has EIN 23-1581227 as a 501(c)(3) Public Charity. Its official mission is "The Pennsylvania School for the Deaf educates students to succeed by recognizing and developing individual strengths, building confidence, collaborating with families and communities in a nurturing, dynamic, and language-rich environment steeped in cultural awareness of Deaf, Hearing, and worldwide diversity." In 2024, it claimed total revenue of $21,839,366 and total assets of $55,059,525.

== History ==
- Pennsylvania Institution for the Deaf and Dumb
- U.S. National Register of Historic Places
- U.S. Historic district
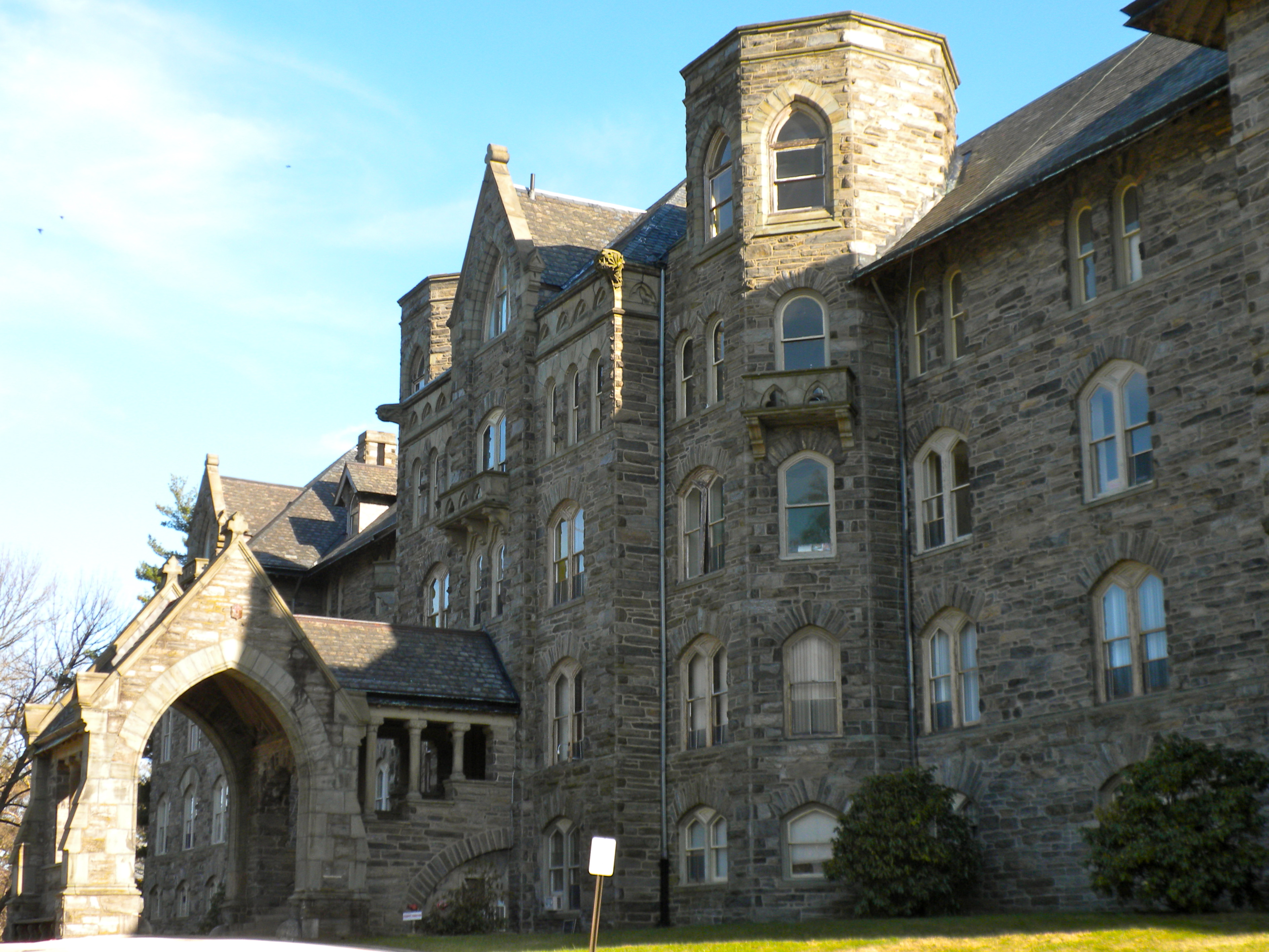
- The old campus

- Location within Philadelphia Location within Pennsylvania Location within the United States
- Location: 7500 Germantown Ave., Philadelphia, Pennsylvania
- Coordinates: 40.032°N 75.175°W
- Built: 1890
- Architect: Wilson Brothers & Company; Cope & Stewardson
- Architectural style: Late Victorian
- NRHP reference No.: 85000999
- Added to NRHP: May 9, 1985

In 1819, Seixas began bringing deaf youngsters into his home to provide them with food, clothing and instruction, all at his expense. More space became needed to accommodate additional children as Seixas' humanitarian efforts became known, so he rented an office at the southeast corner of Eleventh and High (later Market) Streets to serve as a school. In 1821, prominent Philadelphia citizens decided to help Seixas by incorporating a charitable society: the Pennsylvania Institution for the Deaf and Dumb. The organization was chartered by the Commonwealth of Pennsylvania as "an asylum and school in the city of Philadelphia, where the children of the rich, for a moderate compensation, and of the poor, gratuitously, laboring under the privation of the faculty of speech, are maintained and educated." (Act of the Pennsylvania General Assembly, February 8, 1821) The state also provided financial assistance. Episcopal Bishop William White served as the school's president until his death in 1836.

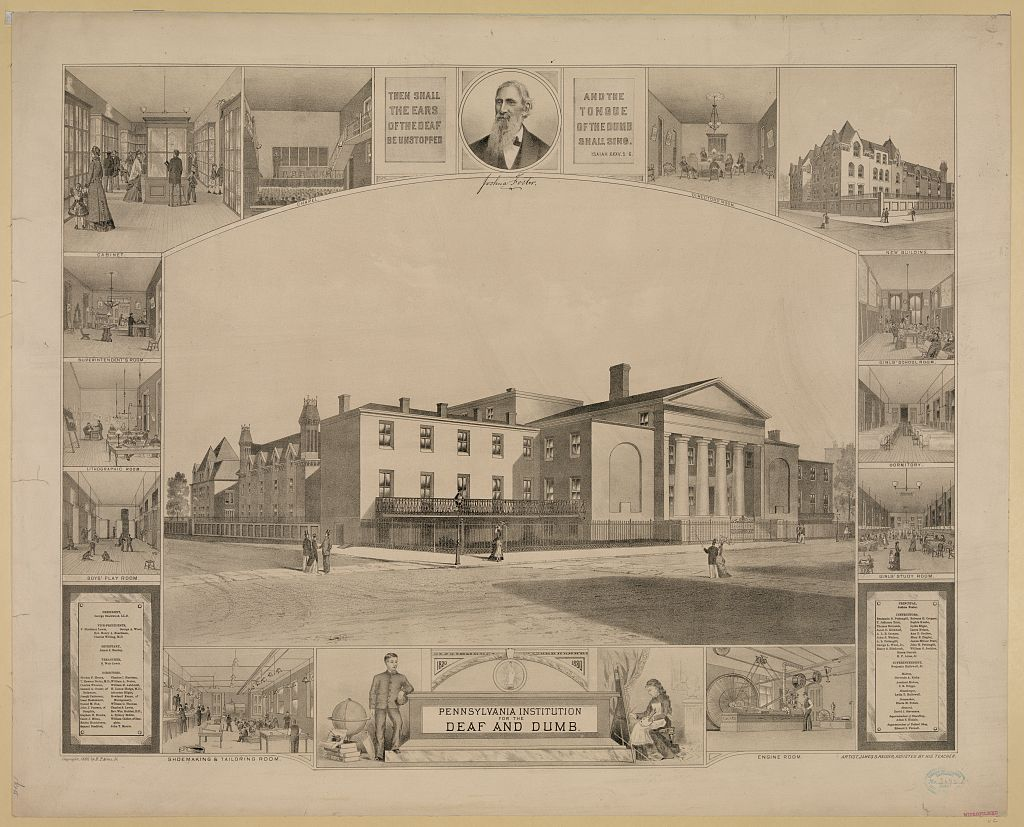
Pennsylvania Institution for the Deaf and Dumb (1826–1893), Broad & Pine Sts., Philadelphia, PA. Now Hamilton Hall, University of the Arts.

The number of deaf children needing special education increased so much that a much larger school—more accurately, an asylum—was soon needed. This became the stately Greek Revival structure that still stands at the northwest corner Broad and Pine Streets. Completed in 1826 and later incorporating two additions, this building is an excellent example of major works by two of America's most important 19th-century architects: John Haviland and Frank Furness. An extension to the original building has been attributed to William Strickland but no evidence supports that claim. When the Pennsylvania School moved to a 70-acre (280,000 m^{2}) campus in Philadelphia's Mount Airy neighborhood in 1892–1893, the Broad and Pine building was purchased by the predecessor of Philadelphia's University of the Arts, the Pennsylvania Museum & School of Industrial Art. The structure, now known as Dorrance Hamilton Hall, is the oldest extant edifice on Broad Street.

Since 1984, the Pennsylvania School for the Deaf has been located in the Germantown section of Philadelphia, occupying several buildings of the Old Germantown Academy site at 100 West School House Lane. Spring Garden College bought the Mt. Airy campus in 1985 and then closed in the early 1990s. The institution presently serves students aged 3 to 18 in preschool through high school classes. In addition, post-secondary services are available to students until the age of 22. As one of four private state-chartered schools, along with the Western Pennsylvania School for the Deaf, which recently took over the Scranton School for Deaf and Hard-of-Hearing Children (formerly known as Scranton State School for the Deaf), the Pennsylvania School is reimbursed for most of its operating expenses by the Commonwealth of Pennsylvania, and eligible youngsters attend tuition-free. The school also depends on charitable contributions. A resource and service center for deaf and hard of hearing adults called the Center for Community and Professional Services also operates on the school's campus.

Under the title Pennsylvania Institution for the Deaf and Dumb, the former campus at 7500 Germantown Avenue was added to the National Register of Historic Places (NRHP) on May 9, 1985. The 1826 Broad Street building is a contributing building in the Broad Street Historic District added to the NRHP in 1984. The current buildings are part of the Old Germantown Academy, added to the NRHP in 1972.

== Notable students ==
Artists Albert Newsam and John Carlin attended the school, starting in 1820.

== See also ==
- Emma Garrett
