= Anne V. Ward =

Scottish-American educator

- Born: March 1877; Glasgow
- Died: May 31, 1971 (aged 94); Philadelphia
- Other names: Anna V. Ward, A. V. Ward, Annie V. Ward
- Occupation: educator
- Years active: 1900-1946
- Known for: teaching blind students, especially at Overbrook School for the Blind

Anne V. Ward (March 1877 – May 31, 1971), sometimes written as Anna V. Ward, Annie V. Ward, or A. V. Ward, was a Scottish-born American educator. She was blind from youth, and taught at the Overbrook School for the Blind for 25 years, until her retirement in 1946.

== Early life and education ==
Anne V. Ward was born in Glasgow, Scotland in 1877, and moved to Philadelphia, Pennsylvania with her parents as a young girl. Her father was a stonemason. She left school worked as a servant from age 12 until she was 16 and became blind after surviving meningitis. Ward then continued her education with help from Elizabeth Roe Dunning, principal of the Pennsylvania Institute for Instruction of the Blind. She completed an undergraduate degree at Vassar College in 1905, and was believed to be one of the first blind women to earn a college degree in the United States.

== Career ==
=== Delaware and New Jersey ===
Anne V. Ward was Delaware's state-appointed teacher of blind adults as a young woman; in addition to teaching, she spoke to community groups and advocated for braille materials in the state's libraries. She worked for the New Jersey Commission for the Blind as a home teacher from 1910 to 1918, based first in Camden (where she organized the city's Blind Association), and later in Trenton. In 1911, she spoke to the Friday Club of Hightstown, New Jersey and the Country Club of Pennington, on her work: "She with another teacher have charge of the southern portion of the state and it is their duty to visit every blind person whose name is found upon the last census report, and of course all others that they may hear of during the year," explained one report, adding that her monthly visits included educational and vocational assessment, instruction, and referrals to adaptive programs and other community resources.

=== Overbrook School for the Blind ===
Ward was employed on the faculty of the Overbrook School for the Blind for 25 years, until her retirement in 1946. She was a member of the Pennsylvania Federation for the Blind, the Pennsylvania State Education Association, the American Association of Instructors for the Blind, and the American Association of Workers for the Blind. While teaching at Overbrook, Ward worked with blind veterans of World War II, teaching braille. She also taught Mae Davidow, who would go on to become the first blind woman to earn a Ph.D. in the United States, at Temple University in 1960. Davidow recalled of Ward that "many of her students will remember her as a good, strict, kind teacher, always aiming to prepare the blind to take their place in the sighted community. She was my inspiration." In 1966, her former students threw a birthday celebration for her, at the nursing home where she lived.

== Personal life ==
Ward lived her later years at the Chapin Home for the Aged Blind in Philadelphia. She died in 1971, age 94.
