= Joshua Francis Fisher =

American author and philanthropist (1807–1873)

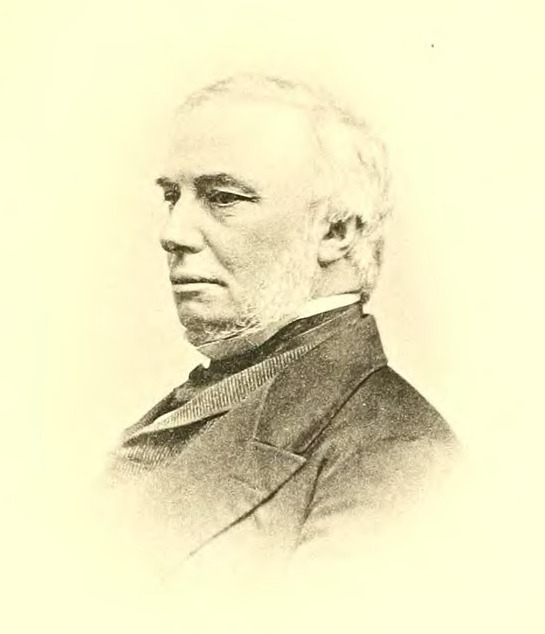
- Born: 17 February 1807
- Died: 21 January 1873 (aged 65)
- Alma mater: Harvard University
- Children: Sophia Georgiana Coxe
- Parent(s): Joshua Fisher

Joshua Francis Fisher (February 17, 1807 – January 21, 1873) was an American writer and philanthropist.

== Biography ==
Fisher was born in Philadelphia. He graduated in 1825 from Harvard College, and was admitted to the bar in Philadelphia in 1829, but did not practice. He became an incorporator of the Pennsylvania Institution for the Instruction of the Blind and studied questions of American, in particular of Pennsylvanian, history. He married Elizabeth Powell Francis, who died during the birth of their only child, Joshua Francis Fisher, who was brought up by relatives. In 1833, Fisher was elected as a member of the American Philosophical Society. During the American Civil War, he sympathized with the Confederacy.

== Works ==
- The Private Life and Domestic Habits of William Penn (1836)
- The Degradation of Our Representative System and Its Reform (1863)
- Reform in Our Municipal Elections (a pamphlet, 1866)
