= Scranton State School for the Deaf =

School in Scranton, Pennsylvania, U.S.

Coordinates: 41.4297°N 75.6401°W

Location
- 1800 N Washington Ave; Scranton, Pennsylvania 18509; United States

Information
- Established: 1880
- Founder: Rev. Jacob M. Koehler
- Closed: 2009
- Authority: Pennsylvania Department of Education
- Teaching staff: 35 (as of 2006-07)
- Age range: 3-18
- Enrollment: 74 (as of 2006-07)
- Student to teacher ratio: 2.1 (as of 2006–07)
- Campus size: 10 acres (40,000 m^{2})
- Team name: Bears
- Website: sssd.neiu.org

Scranton State School for the Deaf (SSSD) was a residential school for the deaf established in 1880 in Scranton, Pennsylvania, United States. Its students ranged in age from birth to 21. At the end of the 2008–09 school year, the school was turned over from state management to the Western Pennsylvania School for the Deaf. The new school was renamed Scranton School for Deaf and Hard-of-Hearing Children.

== History ==
Reverend Jacob Koehler established the school in 1880. In 1913, by authority of a state legislative act, the Commonwealth took control of the school renaming it the Pennsylvania State Oral School for the Deaf. It was subsequently renamed the Scranton State School for the Deaf in 1976.

The passage of the Education for All Handicapped Children Act in 1975 by the federal government categorized state-operated schools as SSSD as not as preferred compared to local school districts providing education for the deaf. SSSD superintendent James Fricke stated that this could make the school unviable.

In 1979 consultant Dr. Neal V. Musmano argued that SSSD should add a junior college department that grants associate degrees.

In 2009 Governor of Pennsylvania Ed Rendell proposed a budget which would remove all funding for the school. Area state representatives opposed this.

Times Leader argued that lawmakers should study carefully the merits of the institution and whether it should be closed before making a decision.

== Campus ==
The school campus was in the Green Ridge portion of Scranton and had 10 acres (4.0 ha) of space.

== Demographics ==
In 2009 the school had 107 students and 75 employees.

== Campus ==
The school had boarding facilities.

== Curriculum ==
By 1979 the school had two computers for deaf education, with each worth $150,000. They had basic mathematics and reading comprehension programs for elementary students and higher levels for secondary and adult students.

By 1979 the school launched an early intervention program to detect hearing loss in infants, called the Parent-Infant program.

== Extracurricular activities ==
Scranton State School for the Deaf athletic teams, known as the Bears, compete in basketball, softball, cross country, soccer, and cheerleading in Pennsylvania Interscholastic Athletic Association and Eastern Schools for the Deaf Athletic Association competition.

== Former superintendents ==
Dr. Victor H. Galloway (1979–1981)

Dr. Dorothy S. Bambach (1988–2006)

- Dr. Monita Hara (2007–2009) – Hara criticized the closure of the school and resigned to avoid getting suspended in retaliation.
