= Sebastian Demanop =

American blind activist (1928–2022)

Sebastian Michael Demanop (June 10, 1928 – June 8, 2022) was a Thai-born American blind activist in Philadelphia, Pennsylvania and the first blind individual from Thailand to receive college training.

== Biography ==
Sebastian Michael Demanop was born in Bangkok, Thailand on June 10, 1928. As a child, he became infected with tracoma which resulted in total blindness. At the age of 21, he won a full scholarship to attend the Overbrook School for the Blind in Philadelphia, Pennsylvania. During high school, he learned English and Braille and graduated in 1953. He earned a Bachelor's degree in secondary education at the University of Pennsylvania. He earned a Master's in psychology at the University of Delaware. His wife, from Berks County, is also visually impaired.

Throughout his lifetime, Demanop worked to advocate for and bring independence to people with disabilities. He worked as a rehabilitator at Delaware Commission for the Blind, where he established the first blind bowling league in Delaware. He also worked as a career counselor at the Pennsylvania Bureau of Blindness and Visual Services in Philadelphia. There, he helped to establish a network of volunteers to assist blind individuals with shopping and reading. He served on the advisory board for the public transit organization, Southeastern Pennsylvania Transportation Authority, and pushed for the installation of "talking" GPS devices on each bus. Later in life, he lobbied in Thailand to push for voting rights for blind citizens in Thailand.

Demanop was one of the few blind members of the Grand Lodge of Free and Accepted Masons of Pennsylvania. He died in Philadelphia on June 8, 2022, at the age of 93.
