= Emma Garrett =

US educator of the deaf

Emma Garrett (c. 1846–1893) was an American educator and advocate of teaching speech to the deaf. She established the Pennsylvania Institution for the Deaf and Dumb in Mount Airy, Philadelphia, to teach the language to the deaf. She paired with sister Mary Smith Garrett to establish their own school with a federal grant. Her educational methods to find how best to fully teach a deaf student can be seen through the word method in teaching which she ultimately created and is still used in educational classrooms with deaf students. Through this she was able to change the lives of many deaf students and allow them a chance at education.

== Biography ==
=== Early life ===
Garret was born in 1846 in Philadelphia, Pennsylvania.

Emma grew up in Philadelphia alongside her sister, Mary Smith Garrett, and together, they both had relatively private childhoods. From an early age, Emma and Mary helped the deaf community, and together were able to make new contributions the world had not seen in any form yet.

=== Education and work life ===
Emma graduated from Boston University School of Oratory, which was Alexander Graham Bell's course for teachers of the deaf, in 1878. From there, Emma went on to become a speech teacher at Pennsylvania Institute for the Deaf and Dumb which was in Mount Airy, Pennsylvania, receiving an invitation from several civic leaders. In 1892, Emma and Mary Garrett founded the Home for Training in Speech of Deaf Children Before They Are of School Age. She was a major advocate for teaching verbal speech to deaf children (oralism) rather than the previous technique, which was strictly sign language (see Manualism). Emma's drive to continue the teachings and widen the knowledge of deaf students led her to begin to teach her version of vocal instruction to other teachers. She did this so that deaf children could be helped on a wider scale. Emma became principal of the Pennsylvania Oral School for Deaf Mutes in Scranton, which formally became a state institute in 1885. Mary, who had many of the same beliefs, became a teacher at Emma's school and continued on with the methods the two sisters had established together.

The Garrett sisters then moved on to establish the Bala House, the Pennsylvania Home for the Training in Speech of Deaf Children Before They Are of School Age, in 1882. Emma became superintendent of the Bala House and appointed Mary as secretary. The Bala House constantly grew for many years due to Emma's energetic fundraising activities. The two began their own method of teaching in an all-day and night program. Emma established the belief that children were much more likely to master speech if they were exposed and trained in it from a very early age. The Bala House became a state institute in 1885. Emma and her students traveled to Chicago to demonstrate her methods of teaching language to the deaf at the World's Colombian Exposition, where Emma began to slowly lose control of her life.

=== Death and legacy ===
Garrett died on July 18, 1893, in Chicago, Illinois. Her death was considered a suicide related to a mental breakdown at the World's Columbian Exposition.

Garrett established the Pennsylvania Home for the Training in Speech of Deaf Children Before They Are of School Age, which is to this day known as the Bala House, which became a state institute in 1885.

== Educational views ==
Garrett, along with her sister Mary, believed that deaf students should be taught with an oral language method. In 1890 Emma Garrett visited seven different countries to view and critique their deaf schools and institutes. When she returned to Pennsylvania to establish her own school she brought back and mixed together many of the views methods incorporated in other countries. The children who entered the school were either born deaf or lost their hearing before acquiring speech, which left Garrett a difficult task of teaching them language. Garrett established the school to be in constant communication and contact with the children from the time they woke up until the time they went to sleep, much like a current boarding school, but just for deaf students.

Garrett saw the ideal world for a deaf child as 'never having to see another deaf child', leading to her creation and establishment of the Pennsylvania Oral School for the Deaf. Emma's first work in teaching school-age deaf children to talk was her own single-element method which, to her, seemed unnatural, so after just one year she gave up that technique and went out to search for the best way possible to fully teach these students. Garrett constantly studied other parts of the world's deaf schools and saw Italy's method of the syllabic method to work well, so she switched to teaching the syllabic method. In a few short years, she had created her own method (a mixture of the syllabic method and other techniques mixed in), the word method. The word method results in better lip reading and speech. Garrett believed that the six or seven-year program she imposed at the Bala House was to be uninterrupted learning due to the strict regimen imposed. The children were not allowed to take vacations outside their school or even travel home for Christmas. It was believed that extended trips such as these would hinder the students' oral education. Once the students developed the speech and lip-reading skills through Garrett's teachings, she then sent them to attend their local public schools to continue their education with her tactics taught and instilled.

== Awards and achievements ==
- Graduated from Alexander Graham Bell's Boston University School of Oratory.
- President of the Southern Association of College Women.
- Alongside her sister, Mary, she established The Pennsylvania Home for the Training in Speech of Deaf Children Before They are of School Age, more commonly known as the Bala House, in 1882.
- Emma became superintendent of the Bala House upon establishment.

== See also ==
- Mary Smith Garrett
- Sarah Fuller
