= Old Germantown Academy and Headmasters' Houses =

Historic school in Pennsylvania, United States

- U.S. National Register of Historic Places
- U.S. Historic district
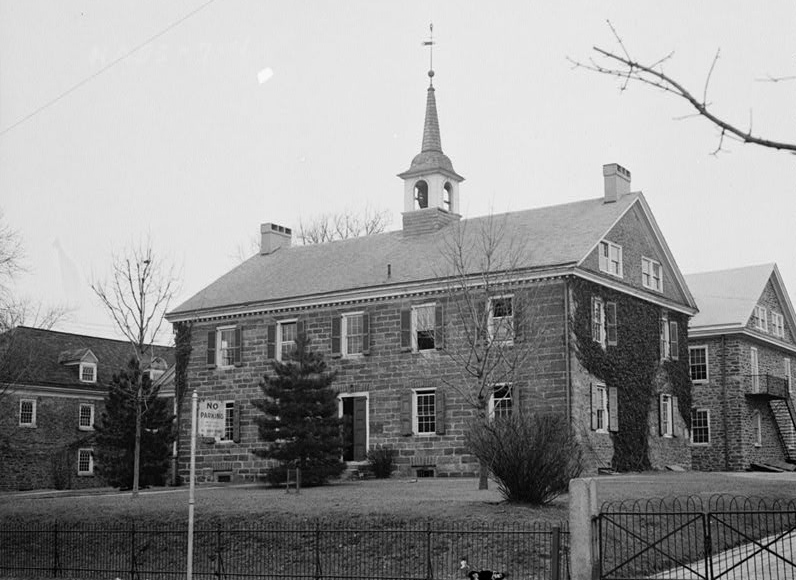

- Location within Philadelphia Location within Pennsylvania Location within the United States
- Location: Schoolhouse Lane and Greene Street, Philadelphia, Pennsylvania
- Coordinates: 40°1′58″N 75°10′27″W
- Area: 9.9 acres (4.0 ha)
- Built: 1760
- Architectural style: Colonial/ Colonial Revival
- NRHP reference No.: 72001168
- Added to NRHP: January 13, 1972

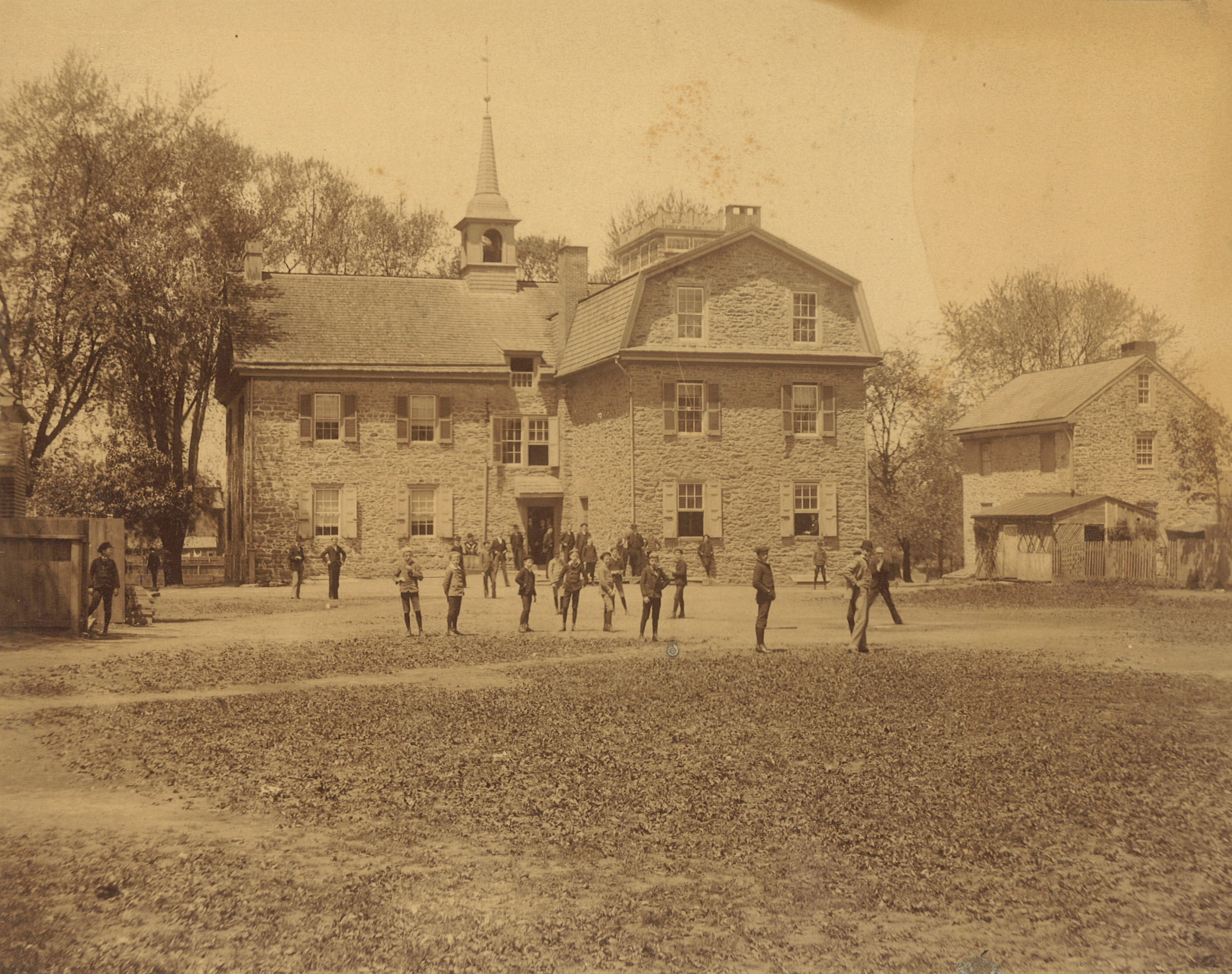
Rear of the old schoolhouse in 1891 before the 1904 addition

The Old Germantown Academy and Headmasters' Houses or The Old Campus is an historic school campus, the original site of Germantown Academy, located at Schoolhouse Lane and Greene Street in Philadelphia, Pennsylvania, United States. The academy moved to a new suburban location in 1965, and the site is currently occupied by the Pennsylvania School for the Deaf.

The site was added to the National Register of Historic Places in 1972.

== History and architectural features ==
After the founding of Germantown Academy in 1759, the land for the campus was donated by Dr. Charles Bensell, a prominent Germantown landowner and later trustee of Germantown Academy.

The first structure erected on campus was the old schoolhouse with belfry. It was built using local Wissahickon schist and was designed in the colonial style. Until the school's 1965 relocation, this school held the distinction of being the oldest school still operating out of its original building. The schoolhouse was replicated on the 1965 campus in Fort Washington.

The bell that hung in the belfry was first ordered in 1770 and brought over from England on the tea ship Polly. Due to the tensions with the British crown in the early 1770s, however, the ship was unable to land; as a result, the bell was transported to Chester, Pennsylvania, where it remained until it could be moved to Germantown.

Seven years later, during the Battle of Germantown, the Germantown Academy was used as a hospital and camp for the occupying British army. Recorded stories indicate that troops used the belfry and its weathervane for target practice before and after the battle. During the same occupation, the first game of cricket played in the United States was reportedly played on the academy lawns.

Today, the original weathervane, complete with a British crown (no longer in use), still shows bullet damage.

== Campus additions ==
Between its start in 1759 until 1888, the campus changed very little, even as the school grew in number and in prominence. At the insistence of alumni, a gymnasium was donated for student use. The building was known as Alumni Hall and was later converted into the school chapel after the building of a new gymnasium in 1950. The building was built closest to the corner of Schoolhouse Lane and Greene Street and was designed in the Colonial Revival style of architecture.

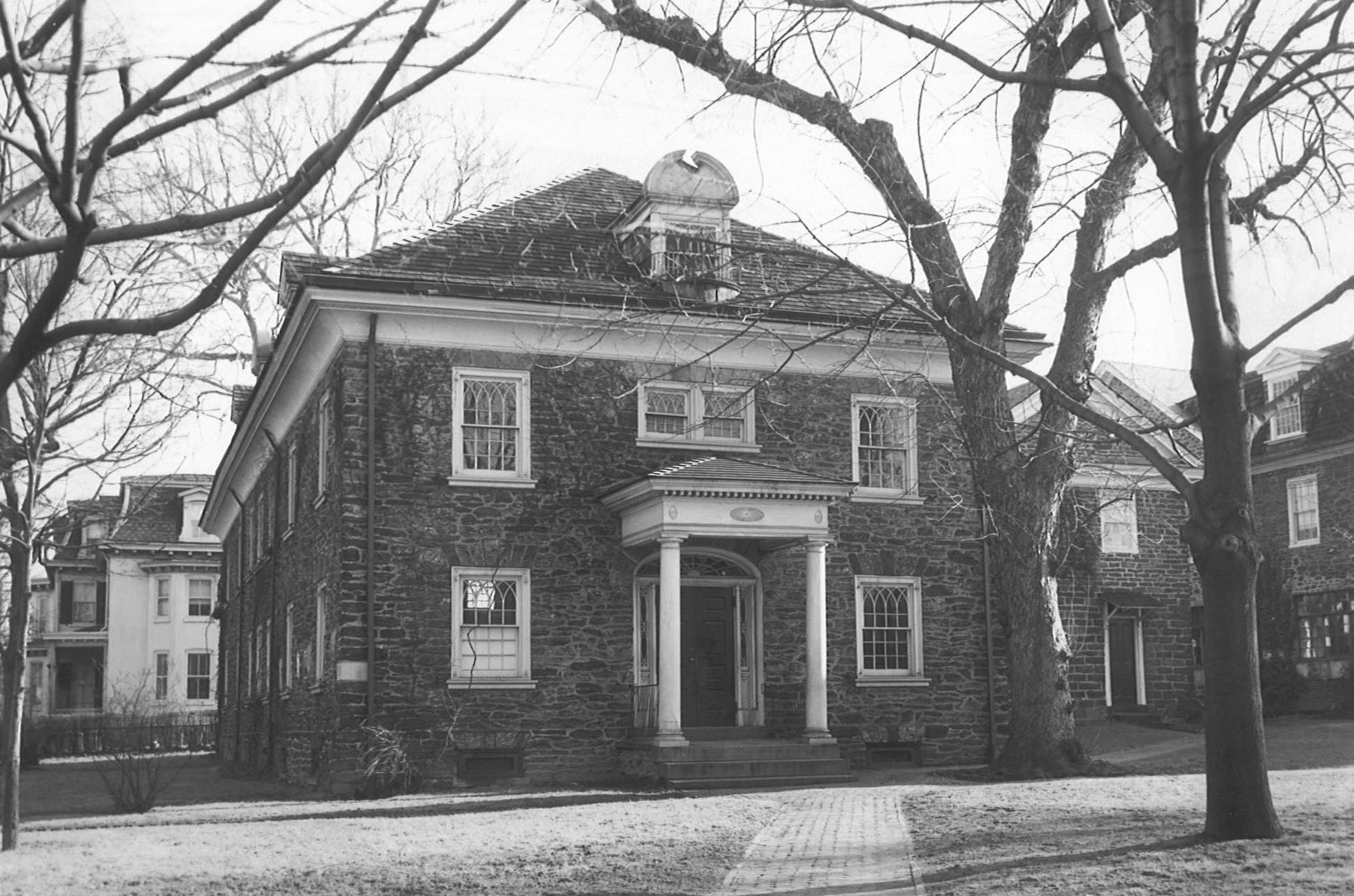
Pictured here c. 1950 is the Alumni Gymnasium

At the turn of the century, academy leaders proposed that a rear addition be made to the 1760 schoolhouse. That addition became known as Sauer Hall, and was named after Christopher Sauer, one of the founders of the academy and the publisher of the first German bible in America.

In 1920, academy leaders purchased the adjoining property on Schoolhouse Lane, looking toward Wayne Avenue, that was known as the Alburger property and later as the Dove House and Kershaw Hall. The Alburger residence had been built during the 1760s as a house for one of the early masters of the academy. Over time, it was used by different families and changed from its colonial origins into a building with distinct Victorian architectural traits.

The house briefly hosted George Washington in 1793, during his stay in Germantown at the time of the Yellow Fever epidemic in Philadelphia, Pennsylvania and while it was the home of the academy's German master, the Rev. Frederick Herman. Washington and some of his former generals were treated to meals and reportedly used the house for cabinet meetings during the epidemic.

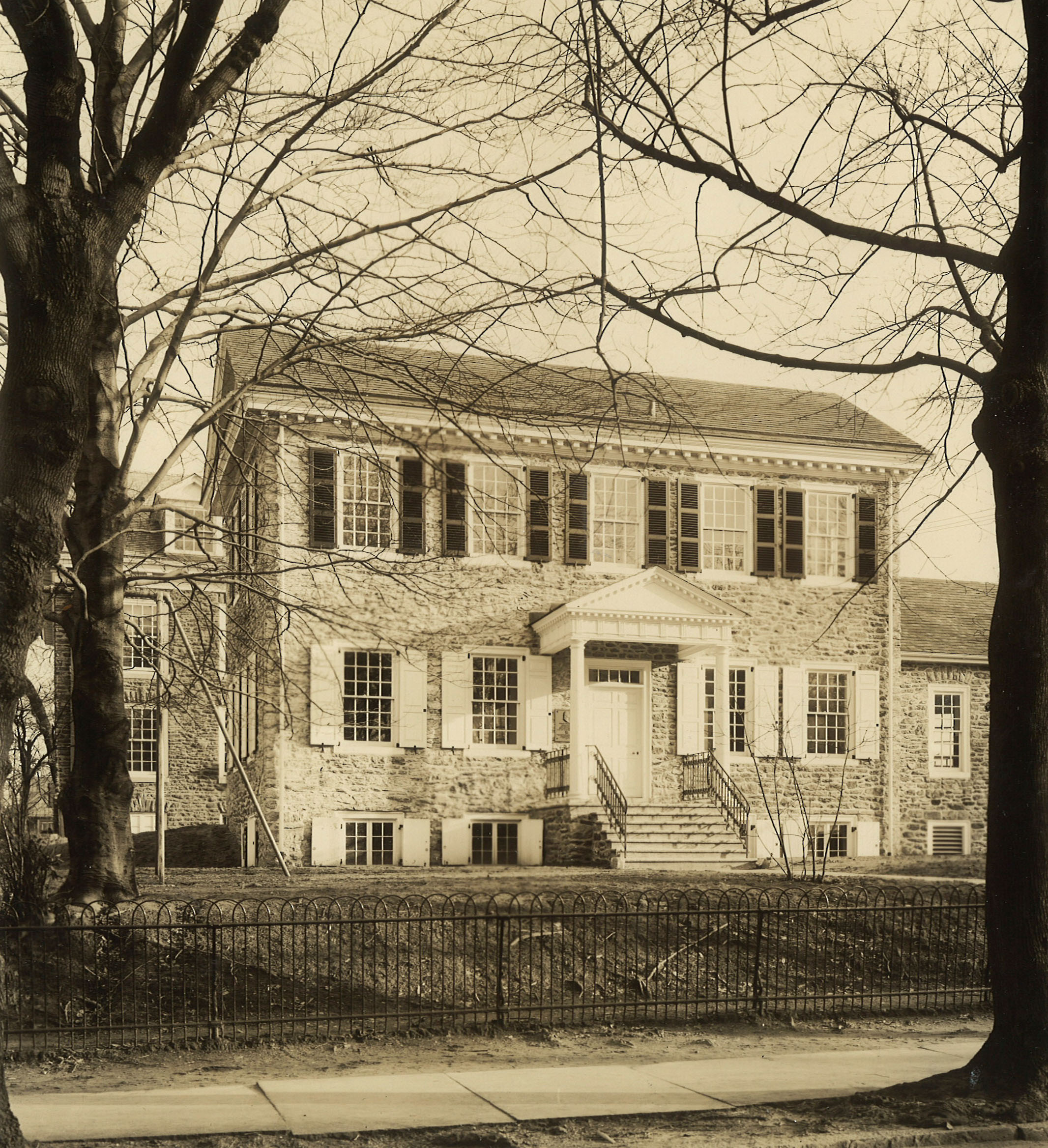
Dove House after its 1937 renovation. George Washington stayed here in the 1790s

The house was bought by the academy in 1920 and was restored to its original Colonial style in 1937. Originally two stories, a third story was built during its occupation by families. During the renovation, the third story was removed. In 1937, the house received an addition (in the same Colonial style) which was used for kindergarten classrooms.

The next addition to campus came in 1932 after the death of alumnus Edward Wynne Moore, who had been a member of the class of 1903. Moore Hall was constructed and served as a space for the intermediate grades. The building was erected in the rear of Dove House.

The last building to be built before the school's move to Fort Washington was the gymnasium that was erected to the right of the Dove House, looking toward Wayne Avenue. The gym was built between 1950 and 1951 in honor of recent academy members who were veterans of the World Wars.

== Athletic spaces ==
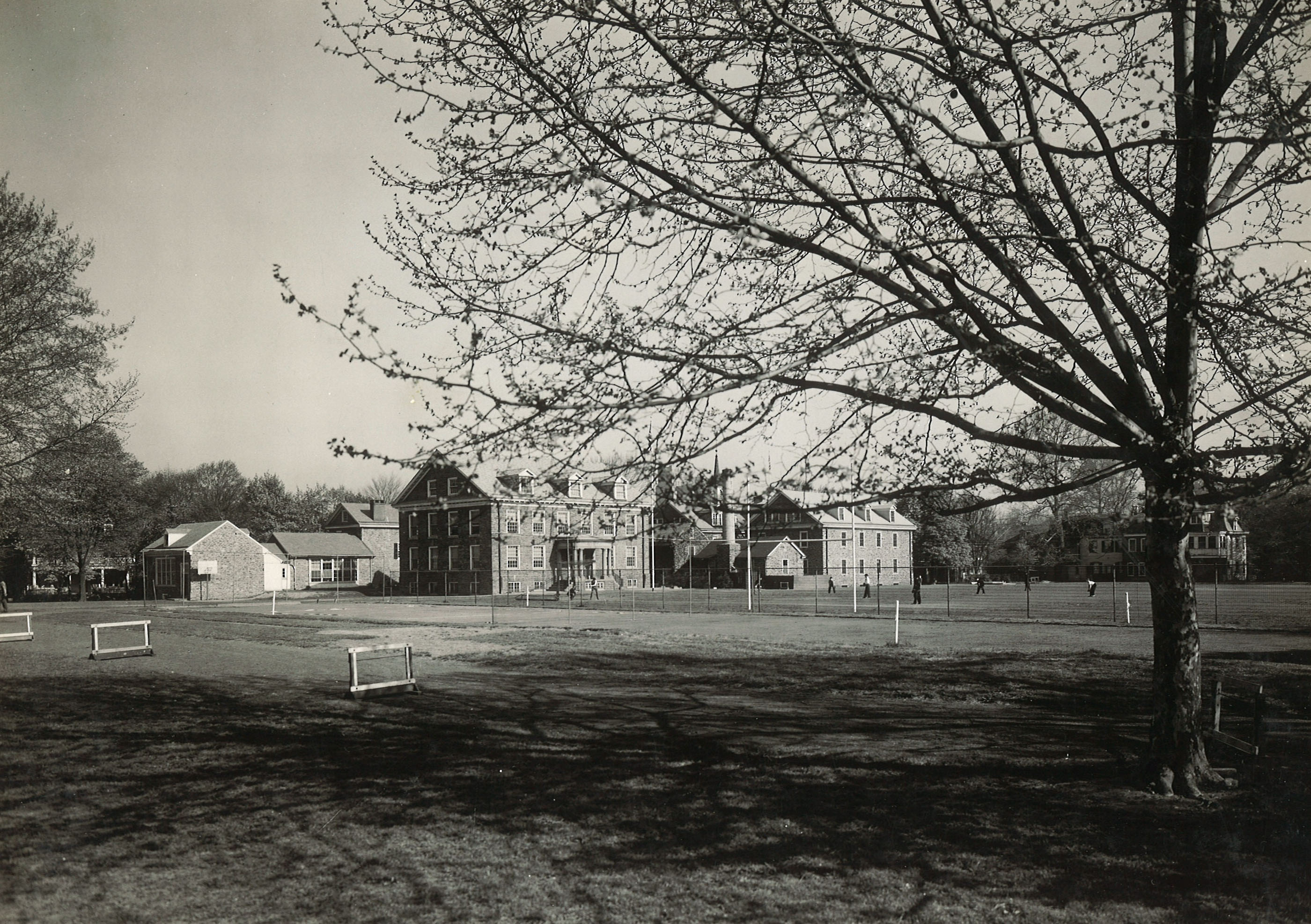
A view of the school and fields

Located in the rear of the 9-acre (3.6 ha) property was an athletic field that served as a football and baseball field and a track, depending on the season. Due to the lack of space, many teams including the soccer and tennis teams had to play at the nearby Germantown Cricket Club. This developed a relationship between the club and the school that would last until the move. As there was no pool on the campus, the swim team practiced at the Germantown YMCA or in the nearby suburbs.

The site was added to the National Register of Historic Places in 1972.

== See also ==
- National Register of Historic Places listings in Northwest Philadelphia
