= Scranton School for Deaf and Hard-of-Hearing Children =

Private school in Pennsylvania, U.S.

The Scranton School for Deaf and Hard-of-Hearing Children

Location
- 537 Venard Rd. South Abington Township (Clarks Summit address), Pennsylvania 18411; United States; 41.429470°N 75.641963°W

Information
- Type: Specialized school
- Established: 2009
- Director: Dean Pettinato
- Superintendent: Kevin McDonough
- Age range: 3-21
- Campus size: 100 acres (400,000 m^{2})
- Colors: Blue & Gold
- Mascot: Bear
- Team name: The Scranton Bears
- Publication: Bear Tracks
- Affiliation: Western Pennsylvania School for the Deaf
- Website: www.thescrantonschool.org

The Scranton School for Deaf and Hard of Hearing Children is a specialized private school located in South Abington Township, Pennsylvania (with a Clarks Summit postal address), serving deaf and hard of hearing students from Northeast and Central Pennsylvania, United States. Formerly administered by the Pennsylvania Department of Education, the Scranton State School for the Deaf was closed at the end of the 2008–2009 school year. All rights to administer the school were transferred to the Western Pennsylvania School for the Deaf.

At the commencement of the 2009–2010 school year, the name of the program responsible for administering deaf education in Northeast Pennsylvania was changed to The Scranton School for Deaf and Hard-of-Hearing Children—a Program of the Western Pennsylvania School for the Deaf.

== Campus ==
In 2010, The Scranton School purchased a 100-acre property in South Abington Township from the Lourdesmont school. Academic services remained at the Scranton campus until the 2010/2011 school year while all residential services moved to the South Abington Township campus. The Barbara Graham Residence was renovated in July 2010. It houses residential students during the school week.

A full-scale renovation of the new campus took place during the 2010/2011 school year. Renovations were completed in time for the 2011/2012 school year. A second renovation occurred during the summer of 2012. The second floor of the building was renovated which includes the Weinberg Wing, Art Room, Playroom, and a Synergistic Science Lab. A playground was also added that summer. Some of these renovations were funded through donations.

== Leadership ==
The School is part of the Programs of The Western Pennsylvania School for the Deaf (WPSD). Led by Superintendent Kevin McDonough, the Programs of WPSD made it the largest provider of deaf education services in the Commonwealth of Pennsylvania.

The Principal of The Scranton School is Sarah Briggs.
