= Julius Reinhold Friedlander =

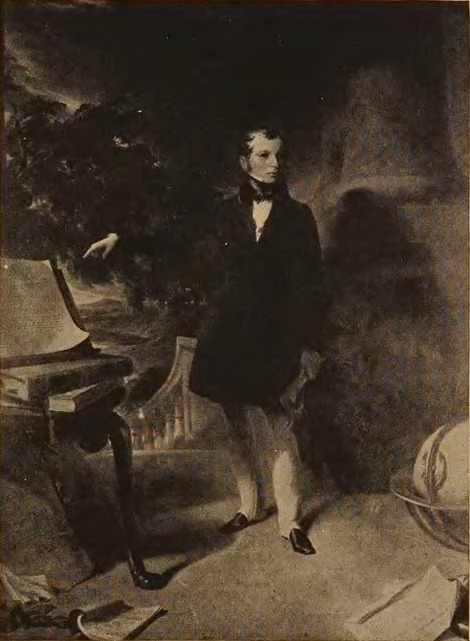
- portrait by John Neagle
- Born: 1803
- Died: 1839 (aged 35–36)

Julius Reinhold Friedlander (1803–1839) was a German-American educator. He was the founder of the Pennsylvania Institution for the Instruction of the Blind in Philadelphia, which later became the Overbrook School for the Blind.

== Biography ==
Julius Reinhold Friedländer (equivalently "Friedlaender") was born 21 April 1803, in Ratibor, Upper Silesia, then part of the Kingdom of Prussia and now in Poland.

In 1832 Friedlander founded the Pennsylvania Institution for the Instruction of the Blind, becoming its superintendent. In 1838, he and Samuel Gridley Howe published embossed versions of the Book of Ruth and the Book of Proverbs.

Friedlander's other preserved works include:

- An address to the public, at the first exhibition of the pupils of at the Pennsylvania Institution: November 21, 1833.
- To the inhabitants of Pennsylvania
- Observations on the instruction of blind persons : in a letter to Robert Vaux, John Vaughan, and Robert Walsh, esquires

Friedlander died on March 17, 1839. After his death, the artist John Neagle painted a portrait of him from a death mask.
