= Western Pennsylvania School for the Deaf =

Public school in Edgewood, Pennsylvania, US

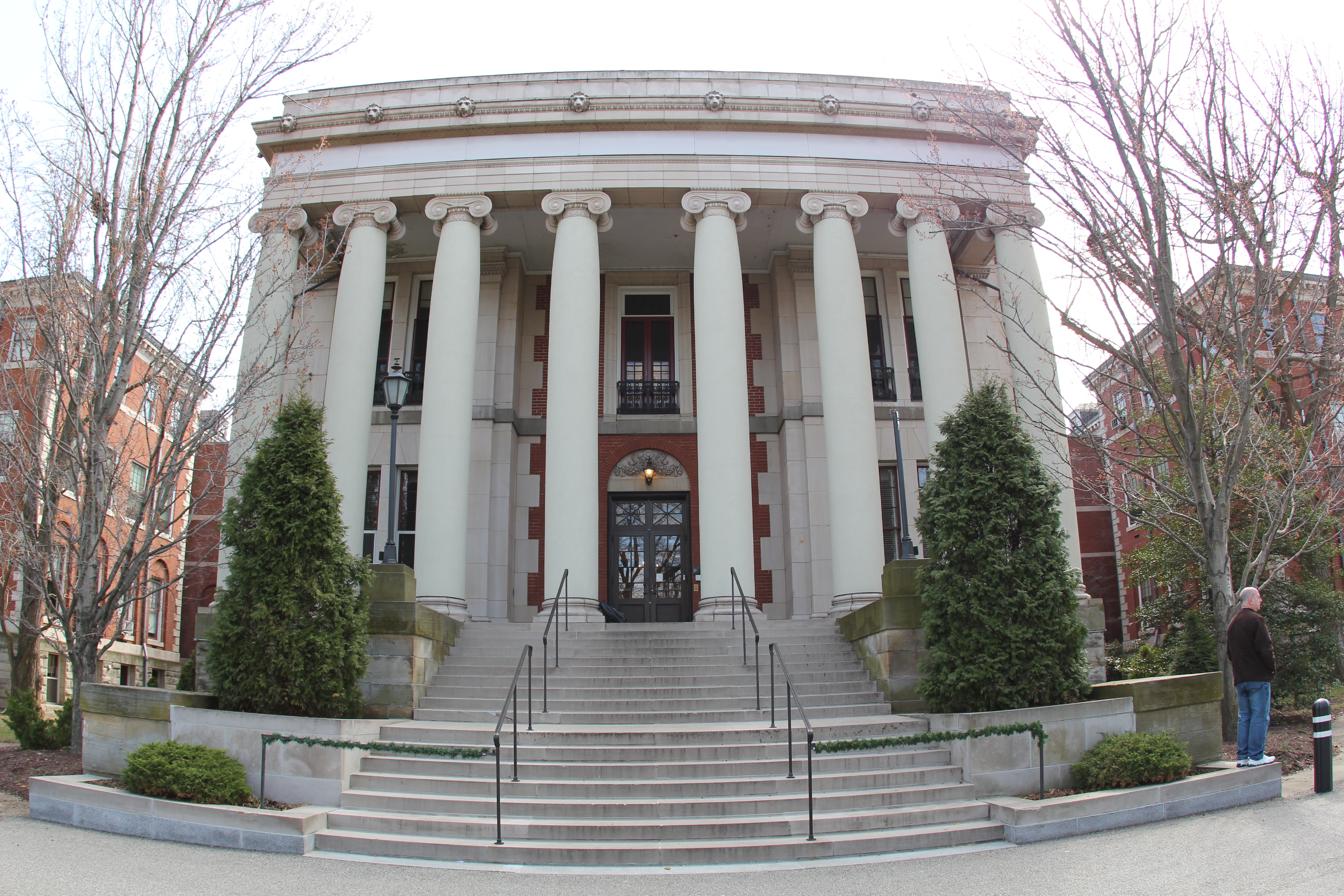

Location
- 300 East Swissvale Avenue; Edgewood, Allegheny County, Pennsylvania 15218; United States; 40.4348°N 79.8819°W

Information
- Type: Public Mainstream Charter, Deaf
- Established: 1869; 157 years ago
- Administrator: Donald Mazreku, M.Ed.
- Director: Carrie Rain, M.Ed.
- Principal: Jennifer Stuber, M.Ed.
- Principal: Gregory Mendenhall, MA, M.Ed.
- Superintendent: Kevin McDonough, M.Ed., M.A.
- Grades: PreK-12
- Enrollment: ~200 (2020)
- Language: American Sign Language (ASL), English
- Colors: Navy Blue and Yellow
- Athletics: Volleyball, Soccer, Basketball, Softball
- Mascot: Lions
- Website: www.wpsd.org

Pittsburgh Landmark – PHLF
- Designated: 1998

The Western Pennsylvania School for the Deaf (WPSD) is a school for deaf and hard of hearing children in Edgewood, Pennsylvania. It was established in 1869. The school is listed as a Pittsburgh History and Landmarks Foundation Historic Landmark. The administrative building was built in 1903 by architects Alden & Harlow.

== Affiliated organizations ==
- Alumni Association of Western Pennsylvania School for the Deaf

== See also ==
- Deaf Wrestlefest
- Pennsylvania School for the Deaf
- Scranton School for Deaf and Hard-of-Hearing Children
