= Melrose Park station (SEPTA) =

Railway station in Philadelphia

Melrose Park
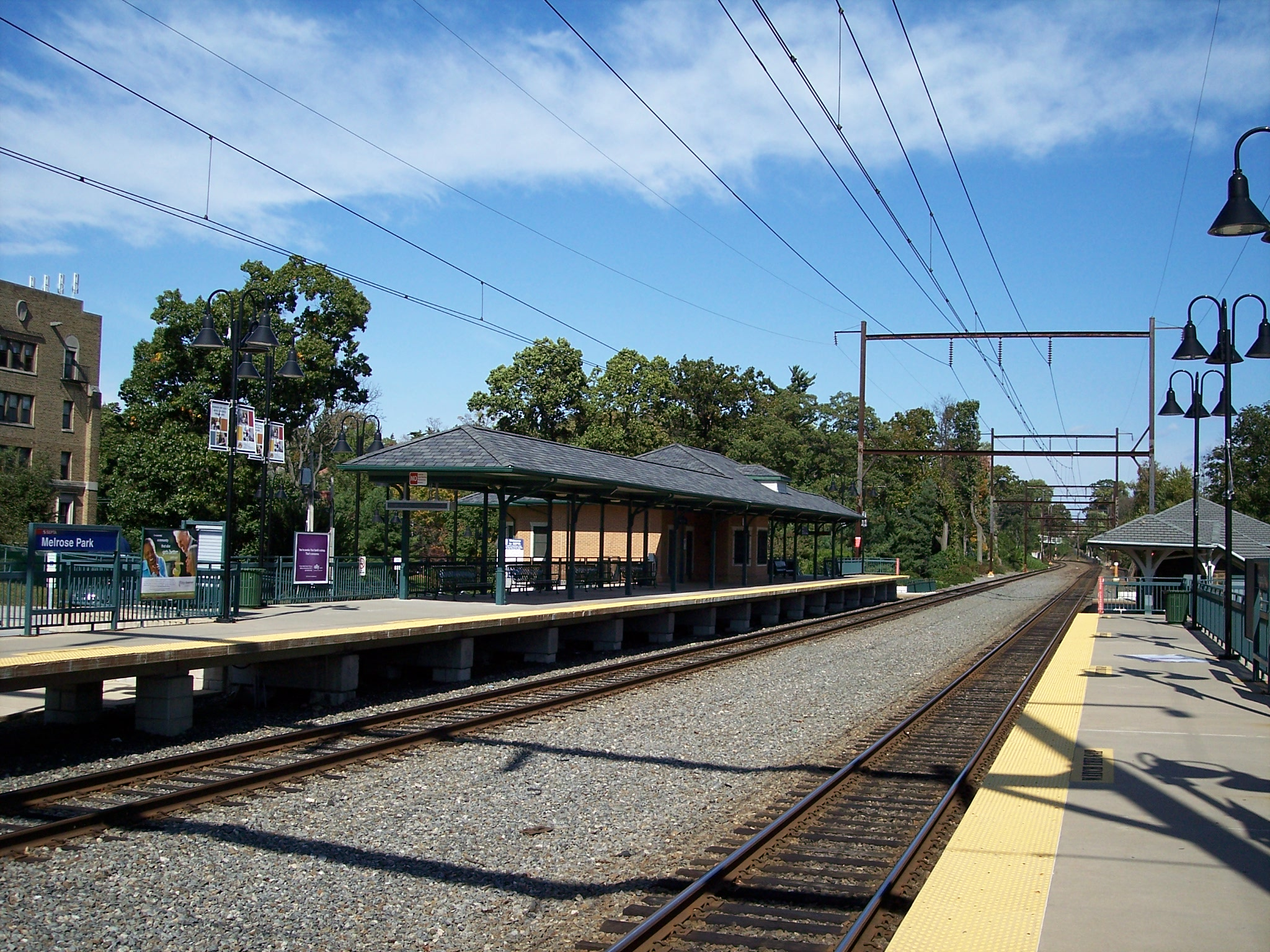

General information
- Location: 800 Valley Road; Melrose Park, Pennsylvania 19027
- Coordinates: 40.0595°N 75.1293°W
- Owner: SEPTA
- Line: SEPTA Main Line
- Platforms: 2 side platforms
- Tracks: 2
- Connections: SEPTA City Bus: 28

Construction
- Parking: 185 space parking lot
- Accessible: yes

Other information
- Fare zone: 2

History
- Rebuilt: 2005
- Electrified: July 26, 1931
- Former names: Oak Lane

Passengers
- 2017: 507 boardings 301 alightings (weekday average)
- Rank: 50 of 146

Services
Preceding station	SEPTA	Following station
Fern Rock toward Airport	Airport Line	Elkins Park toward Glenside
Fern Rock toward Penn Medicine Station	Warminster Line	Elkins Park toward Warminster
Fern Rock toward Penn Medicine Station	West Trenton Line	Elkins Park toward West Trenton
Lansdale/Doylestown Line does not stop here
Former services
Preceding station	Reading Railroad	Following station
Fern Rock toward Philadelphia	Bethlehem Branch	Elkins Park toward Bethlehem
Fern Rock toward Philadelphia	New York Branch	Elkins Park toward Bound Brook
Location

Melrose Park station is a SEPTA Regional Rail station in Melrose Park, Pennsylvania. Located at the intersection of Valley Road and Mill Road, it serves the Lansdale/Doylestown, Warminster, and West Trenton lines.

== Station ==
In June 2005, SEPTA completed a $5,336,000 project to upgrade Melrose Park station, including the installation of high-level, fully handicap accessible, platforms.

In FY 2013, Melrose Park station had a weekday average of 458 boardings and 481 alightings.

== Service ==
The station is served by most weekday and weekend trains on the Warminster Line, limited weekday trains and all weekend trains on the West Trenton Line, and limited weekday trains and no weekend trains on the Lansdale/Doylestown Line.

== Station layout ==
Melrose Park has two high-level side platforms.
