= Elkins Park station =

Rail station in Montgomery County, Pennsylvania, United States

Elkins Park
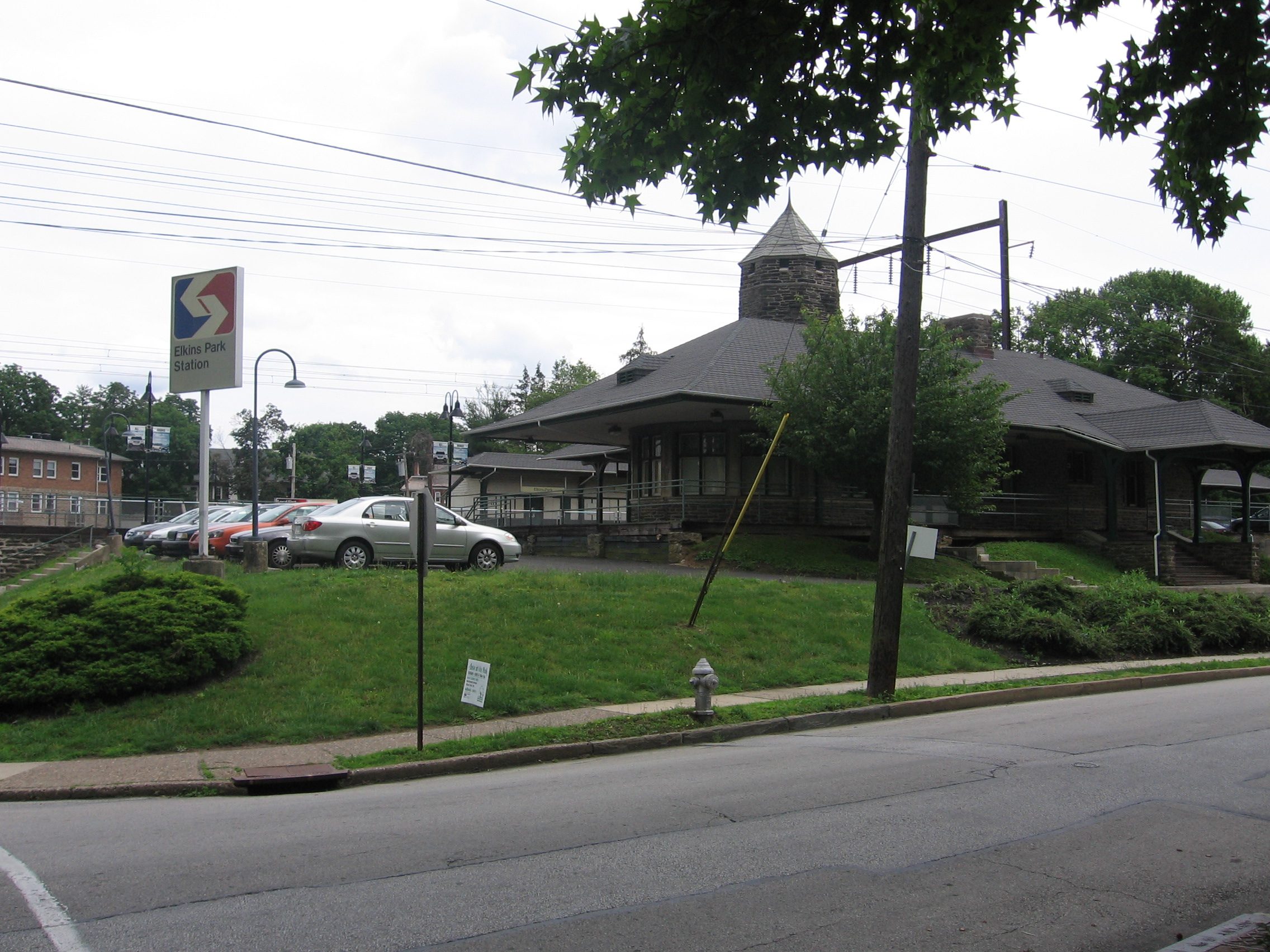
- Elkins Park station, from the intersection of Park and Spring Avenues

General information
- Location: 7879 Spring Avenue; Elkins Park, Pennsylvania 19027
- Owner: SEPTA
- Line: SEPTA Main Line
- Platforms: 2 side platforms
- Tracks: 2
- Connections: SEPTA City Bus: 28

Construction
- Parking: 59 space parking lot
- Accessible: No

Other information
- Fare zone: 2

History
- Opened: May 14, 1899
- Electrified: July 26, 1931

Passengers
- 2017: 302 boardings 406 alightings (weekday average)
- Rank: 89 of 146

Services
Preceding station	SEPTA	Following station
Melrose Park toward Airport	Airport Line	Jenkintown–Wyncote toward Glenside
Melrose Park toward Penn Medicine Station	Warminster Line	Jenkintown–Wyncote toward Warminster
Melrose Park toward Penn Medicine Station	West Trenton Line	Jenkintown–Wyncote toward West Trenton
Lansdale/Doylestown Line does not stop here
Former services
Preceding station	Reading Railroad	Following station
Oak Lane toward Philadelphia	Bethlehem Branch	Jenkintown toward Bethlehem
Oak Lane toward Philadelphia	New York Branch	Jenkintown toward Bound Brook
- Elkins Railroad Station, Philadelphia and Reading Railroad
- U.S. National Register of Historic Places
- Interactive map of Elkins Railroad Station, Philadelphia and Reading Railroad
- Location: Jct. of Spring and Park Aves., Cheltenham Township, Elkins Park, Pennsylvania, USA
- Coordinates: 40°4′16″N 75°7′42″W
- Area: 0.5 acres (0.2 ha)
- Built: 1898
- Architect: Cope & Stewardson Co.
- Architectural style: Queen Anne
- NRHP reference No.: 90001609
- Added to NRHP: October 25, 1990
Location

Elkins Park station is a SEPTA Regional Rail station located in the Elkins Park neighborhood of Cheltenham Township in Montgomery County, Pennsylvania. The station building is listed on the National Register of Historic Places for its notable architecture. The station is located at the intersection of Park Avenue and Spring Avenue. Elkins Park station is served by the Warminster Line, West Trenton Line, and Lansdale/Doylestown Line.

== Station history ==
The station was constructed in 1898 by Cope & Stewardson, at a cost of $40,000. On May 14, 1899, the station opened to Philadelphia and Reading Railroad train service. Originally, it was known as the Philadelphia and Reading Railroad Elkins Railroad station, but has also been known as Elkins Park station and Ashbourne station. The Queen Anne style architecture of the station resulted in the station being added to the National Register of Historic Places in 1990.

The station has low-level, non-handicapped accessible, railway platforms. In FY 2013, Elkins Park station had a weekday average of 632 boardings and 599 alightings.

== Service ==
Elkins Park station is located along one of SEPTA's main rail lines. The station is served by most weekday and weekend trains on the Warminster Line, limited weekday trains and all weekend trains on the West Trenton Line, and limited weekday trains and no weekend trains on the Lansdale/Doylestown Line.

== Station layout ==
Elkins Park has two low-level side platforms.
