= Fern Rock Transit Center =

Rapid transit station in Philadelphia

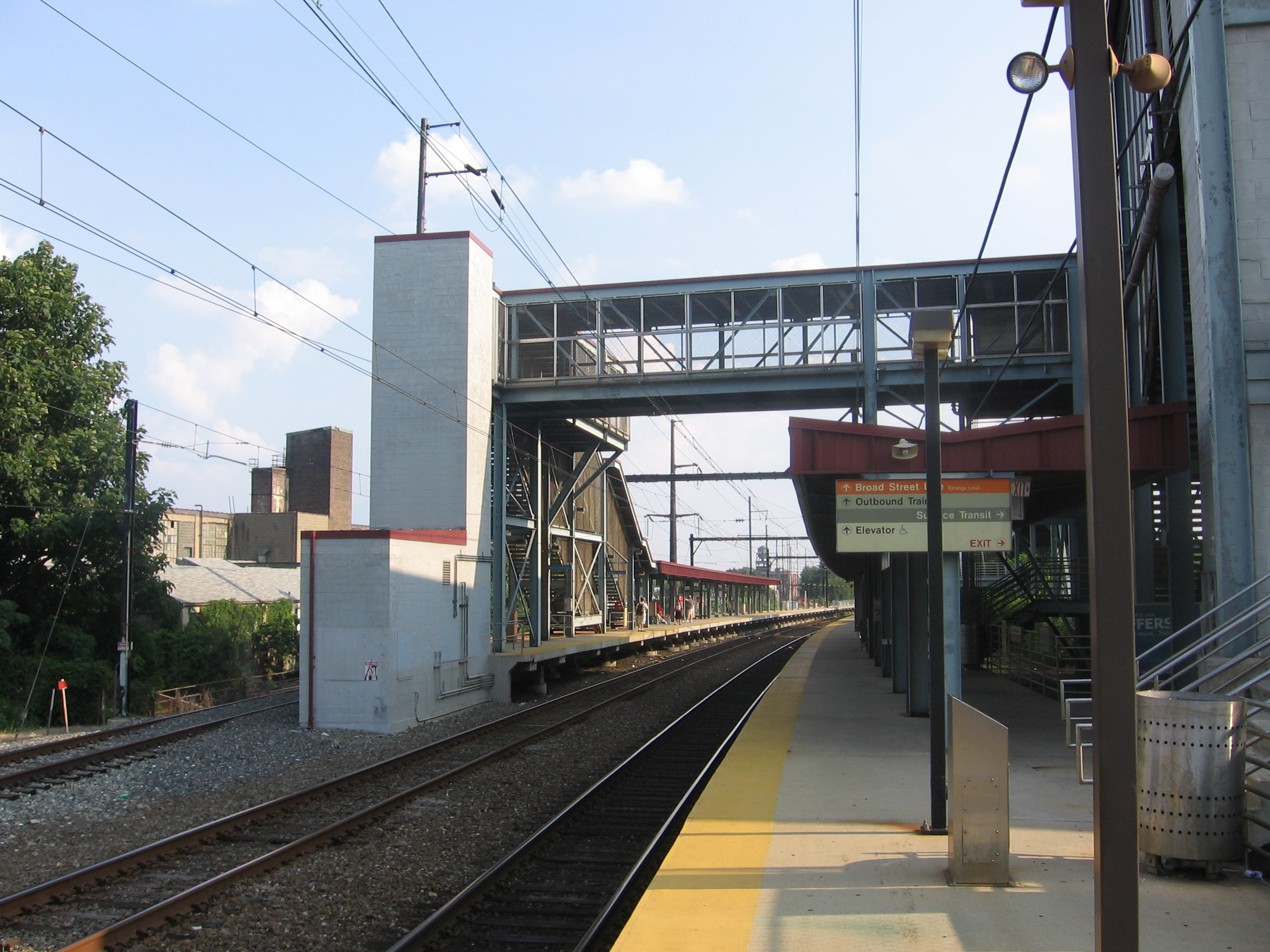
- Fern Rock Transit Center's rail platform

General information
- Location: 900 Nedro Avenue; Philadelphia, Pennsylvania, U.S.
- Coordinates: 40.041°N 75.136°W
- Owner: SEPTA; City of Philadelphia (subway)
- Lines: SEPTA Main Line; Ninth Street Branch (former)
- Platforms: 2 island platforms, 1 side platform
- Tracks: 4 plus storage track
- Connections: SEPTA City Bus: 4, 28, 57, 70

Construction
- Structure type: Surface level
- Parking: 639 parking spaces
- Accessible: yes

Other information
- Fare zone: 1

History
- Opened: September 9, 1956 (Broad Street Line)
- Rebuilt: March 12, 1992
- Electrified: 600 volts DC third rail (Broad Street); Overhead catenary wires (12,000-volt/25 Hz) (Regional Rail)
- Former names: Fern Rock Transportation Center (–2025)

Passengers
- 2017: 650 boardings 779 alightings (weekday average) (Regional Rail)
- Rank: 34 of 146 (Regional Rail)

Services
Preceding station	SEPTA	Following station
Wayne Junction toward Airport	Airport Line	Melrose Park toward Glenside
Wayne Junction toward Penn Medicine Station	Lansdale/Doylestown Line	Jenkintown–Wyncote toward Doylestown
Wayne Junction toward Penn Medicine Station	Warminster Line	Melrose Park toward Warminster
Temple University toward Penn Medicine Station	West Trenton Line	Melrose Park toward West Trenton
Temple University toward Penn Medicine Station	West Trenton Line (weekends and major holidays)	Jenkintown–Wyncote toward West Trenton
Preceding station	SEPTA Metro	Following station
Olney T.C. toward NRG Station	B (SEPTA Metro)	Terminus
Olney T.C. toward Walnut–Locust	B (SEPTA Metro)	Terminus
Olney T.C. toward 8th–Market	B (SEPTA Metro)	Terminus
Former services
Preceding station	Reading Railroad	Following station
Tabor toward Philadelphia	Bethlehem Branch	Oak Lane toward Bethlehem
Tabor toward Philadelphia	New York Branch	Oak Lane toward Bound Brook
Location

The Fern Rock Transit Center (formerly the Fern Rock Transportation Center) is a SEPTA rail and bus station located at 10th Street and Nedro Avenue in the Fern Rock neighborhood of Philadelphia, Pennsylvania. Fern Rock serves as the northern terminus and yard for the SEPTA Metro B, as well as a stop for SEPTA Regional Rail's Lansdale/Doylestown Line, Warminster Line, and West Trenton Line.

Four bus routes also serve the station. Fern Rock Transit Center serves as the western terminus for the 28 and 70 bus routes. Fern Rock is also the northernmost terminus for the 4 and 57 bus routes.

== Regional Rail platforms ==
Fern Rock Transportation Center serves the Warminster Line, West Trenton Line, and the Lansdale/Doylestown Line. In FY 2015, there was a weekday average of 825 boardings and 792 alightings.

The current SEPTA Regional Rail station at Fern Rock Transportation Center, located along the SEPTA Main Line, was built in March 1992 to accommodate Regional Rail commuters displaced during SEPTA's 1992/1993 Railworks reconstruction project. The new station replaced former Reading Railroad stations Fern Rock and Tabor, respectively located north and south of the new station. It has high-level platforms and is handicap-accessible, being directly connected to the subway station by a ramp from the subway platform. While passengers can readily transfer between the Broad Street Line and the Regional Rail Lines at Fern Rock, such a transfer requires payment of a separate fare of the subway and regional rail, unless the rider possesses a SEPTA Trailpass, which can be used for travel on both subway and regional rail. A non-revenue track connection exists here between the SEPTA Regional Rail Lines and SEPTA's Broad Street Line. A train crash occurred here on January 27, 2009, injuring nine.

== Broad Street platform ==
The Broad Street platforms at Fern Rock Transportation Center opened in 1956, when the line was extended north from the original northern terminus at Olney Terminal by the Philadelphia Transportation Company (PTC) and the City of Philadelphia. Fern Rock Transportation Center also hosts the yard and maintenance facilities for the SEPTA Metro B, and is the line's only above ground station.

Fern Rock is the northern terminal for local and express trains on the line, as well as the special event service that extends express service to the South Philadelphia Sports Complex. B3 Spur trains only serve the station all day Saturdays and during evenings on weekdays. All other Ridge Spur service (except Sundays when it doesn't operate) ends at Olney Transit Center.

== Station layout ==
All tracks are located at ground level, with Regional Rail platforms oriented north-south and the Broad Street platform oriented east-west, part of a larger balloon loop around the storage yard.

== Image gallery ==
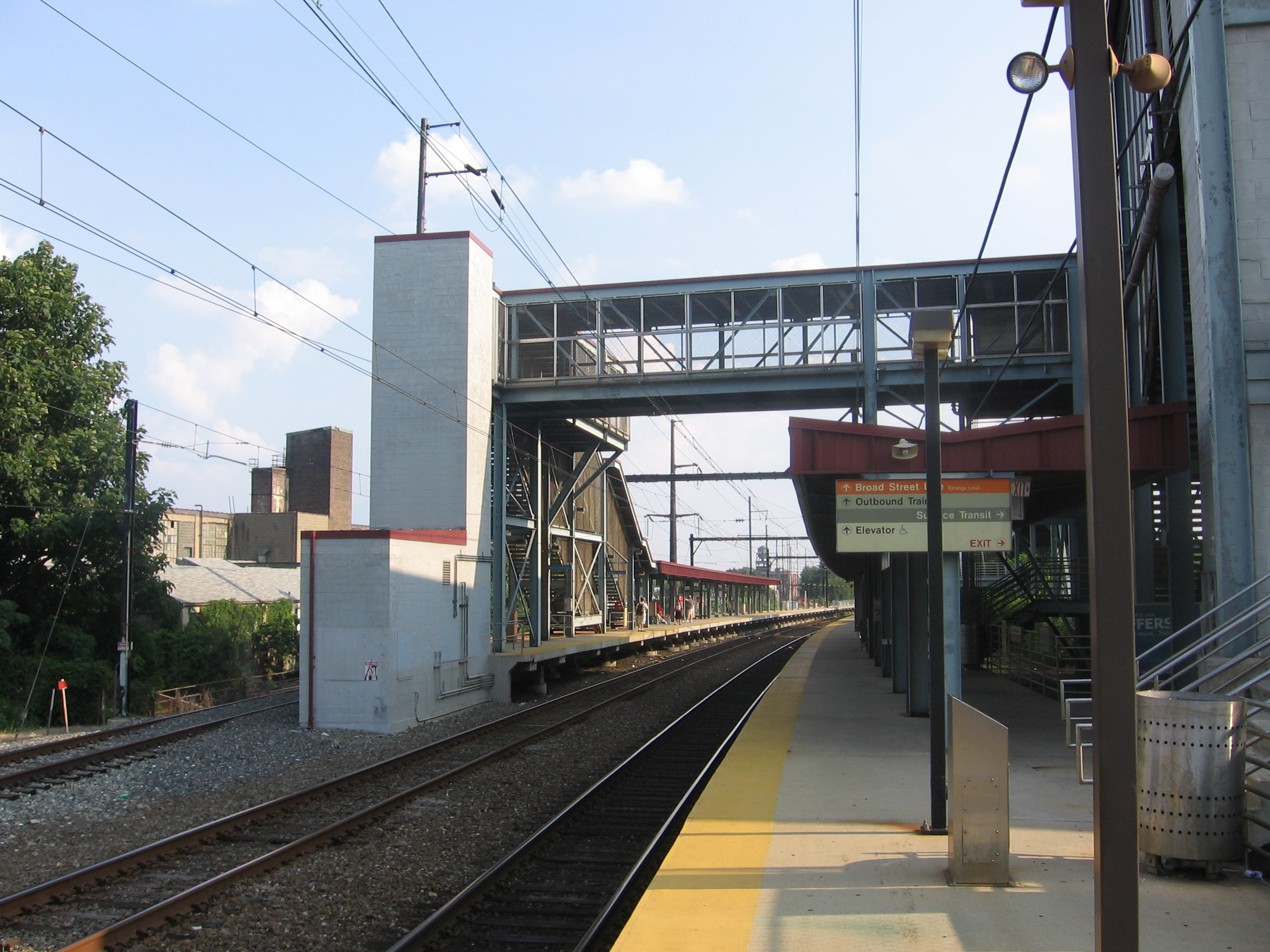
Regional Rail station

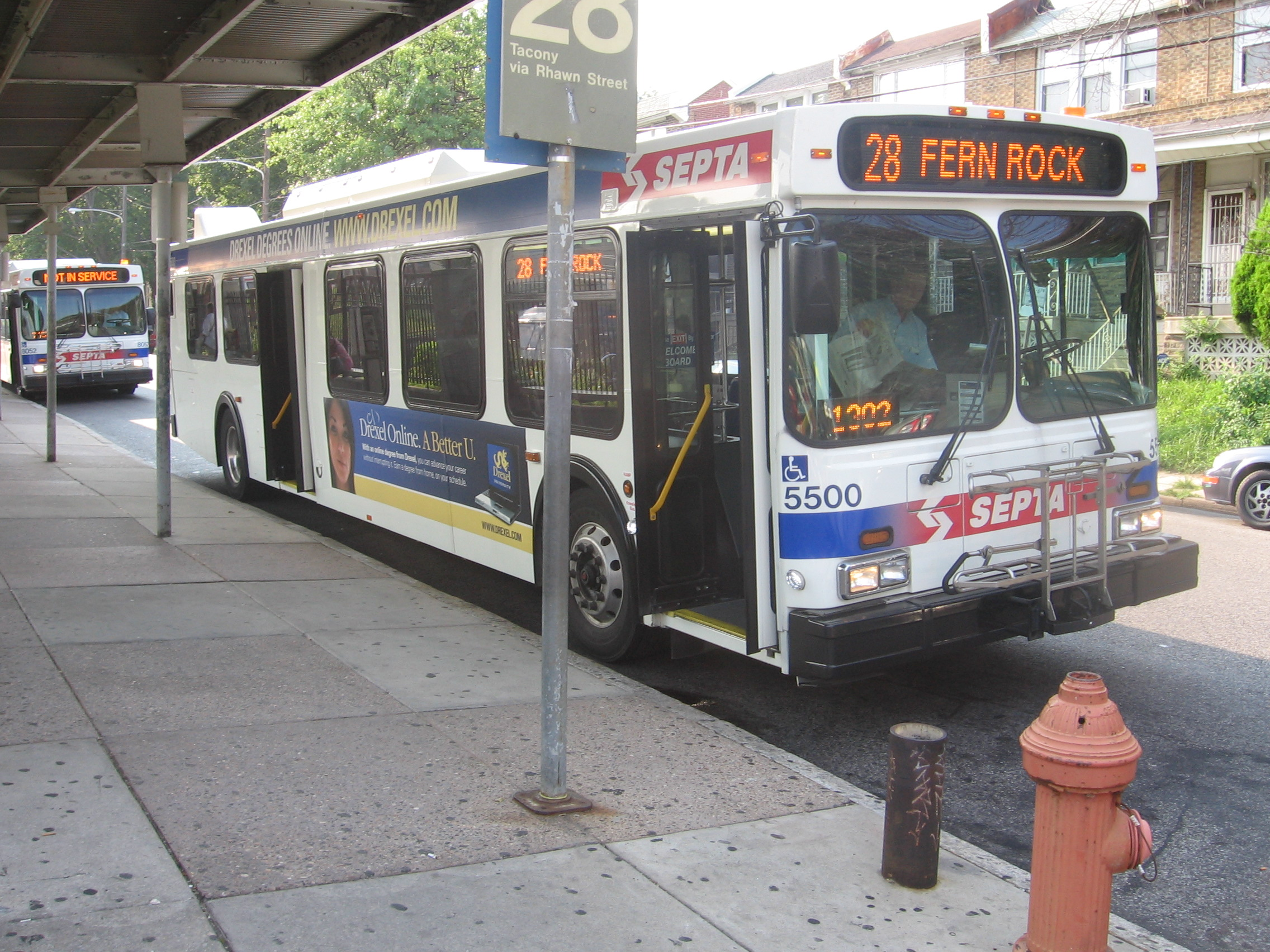
SEPTA Route 28 Bus at Fern Rock

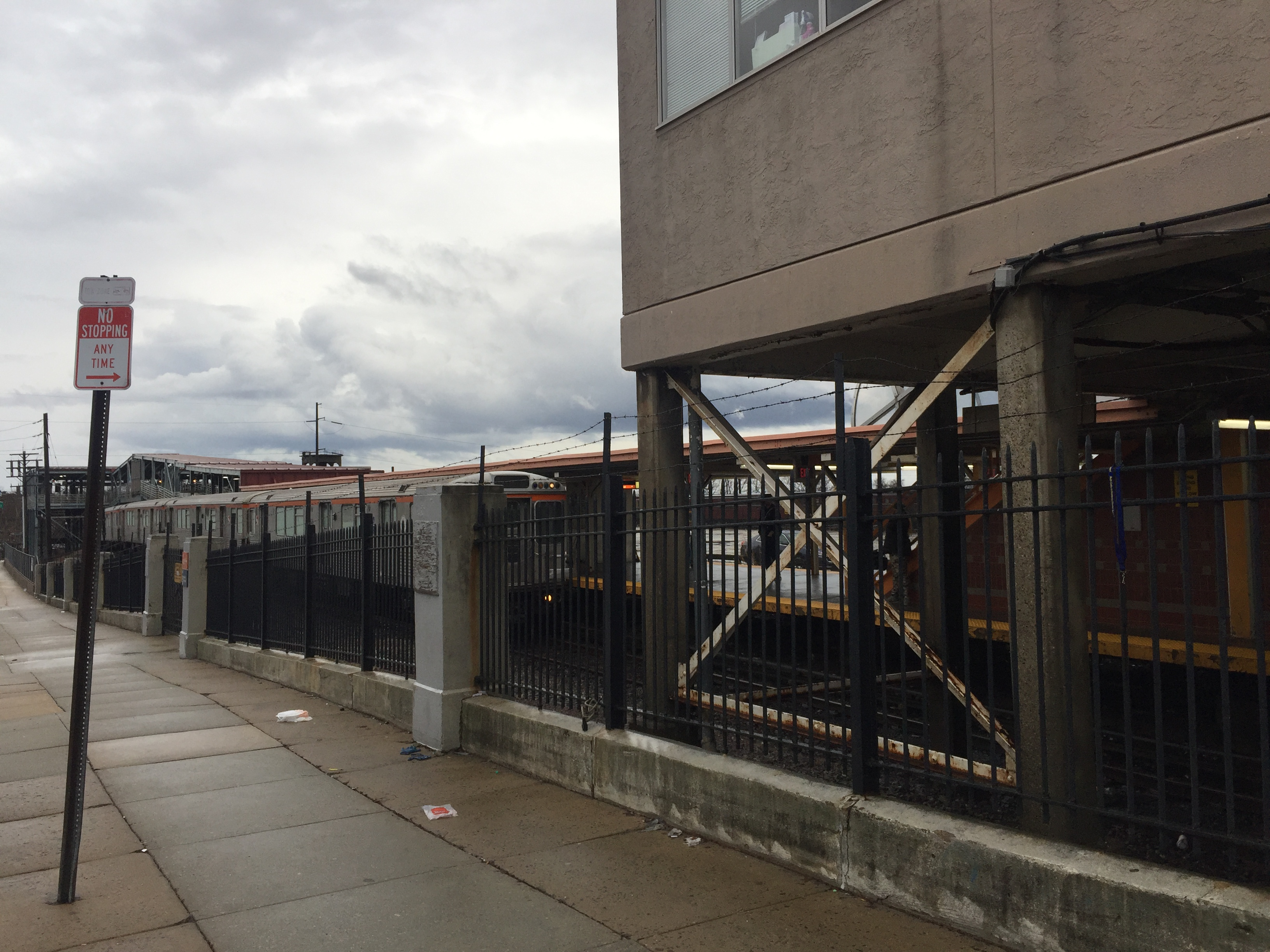
Station with BSL in front, Regional Rail in the back

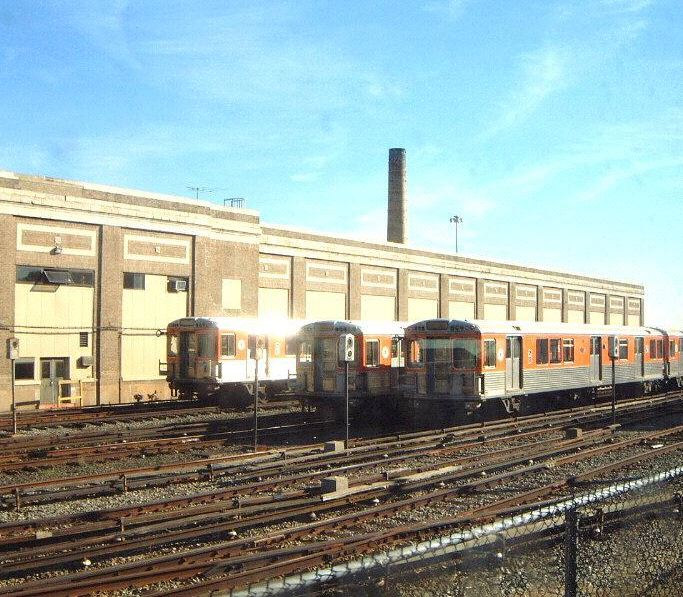
BSL Subway Cars at Fern Rock

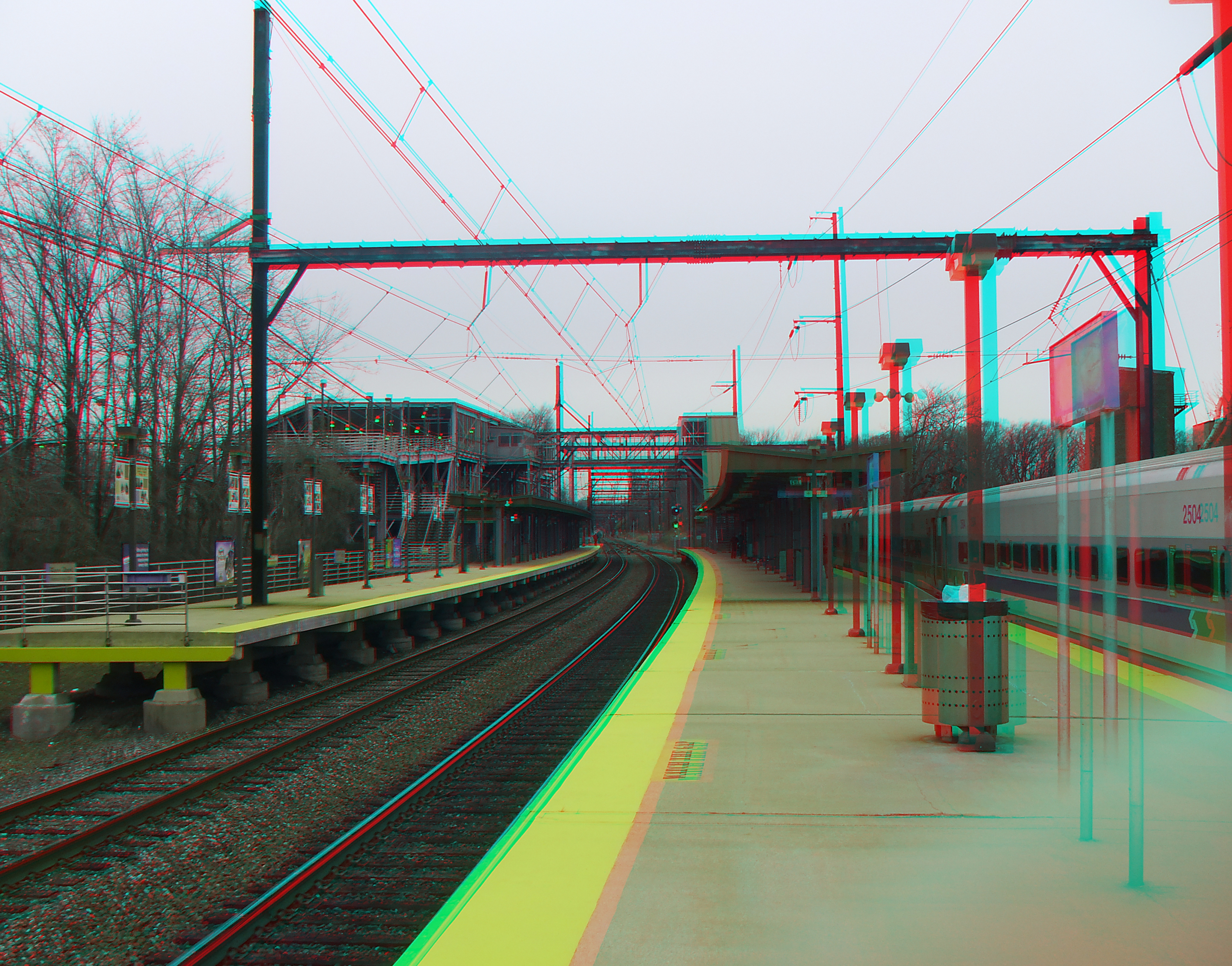
Stereo (3D) picture of outbound train platform at Fern Rock Station (red/blue glasses needed).

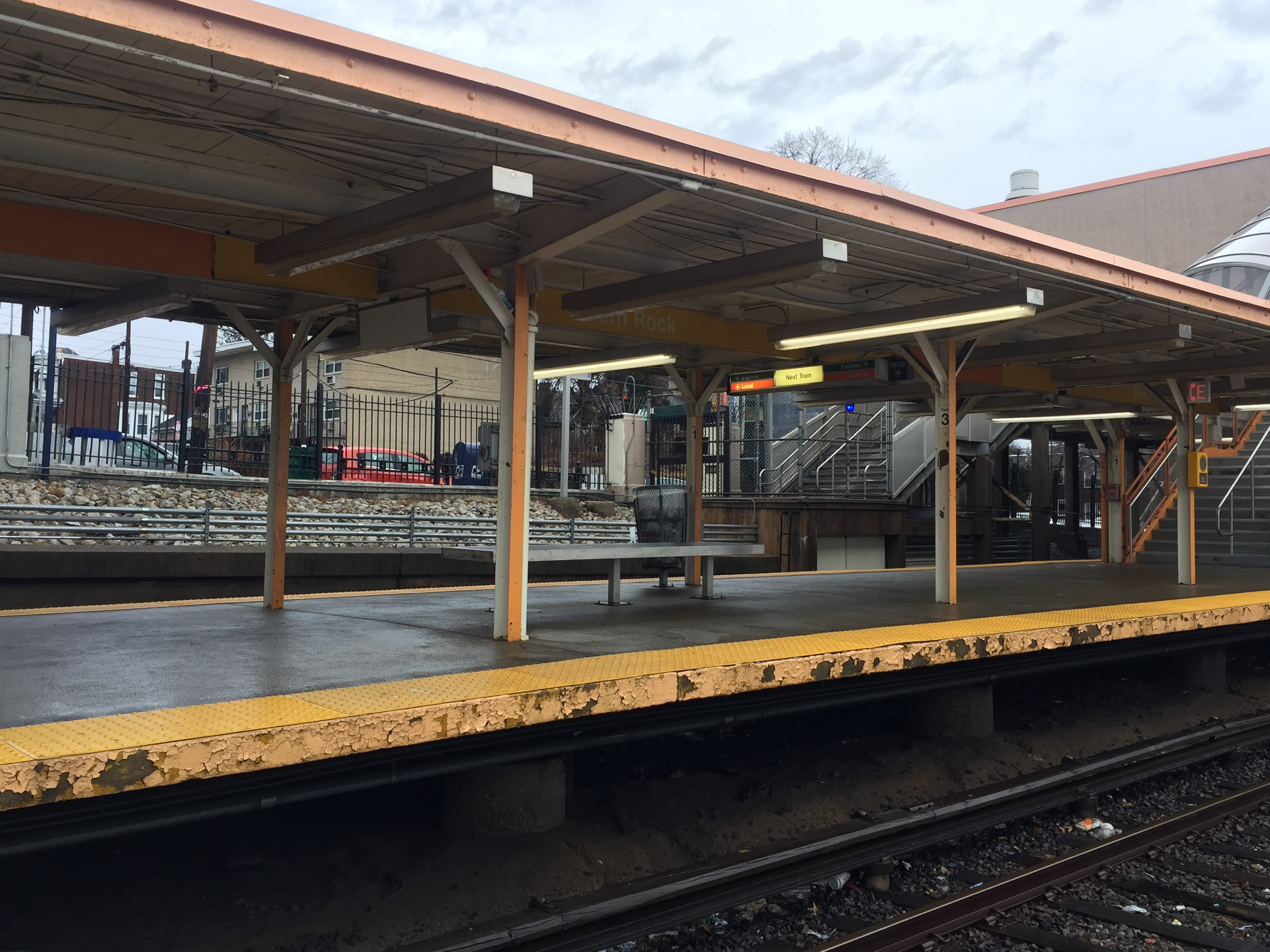
Broad Street Line station

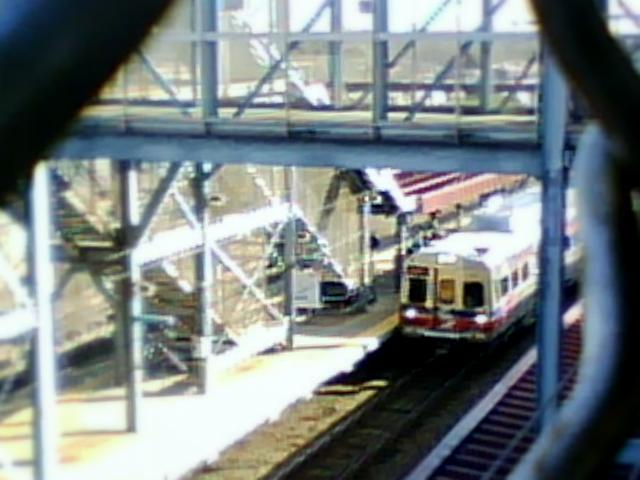
Outbound Silverliner V at Fern Rock Transit Center.
