= Jenkintown–Wyncote station =

Railway station in Pennsylvania, United States

Jenkintown–Wyncote
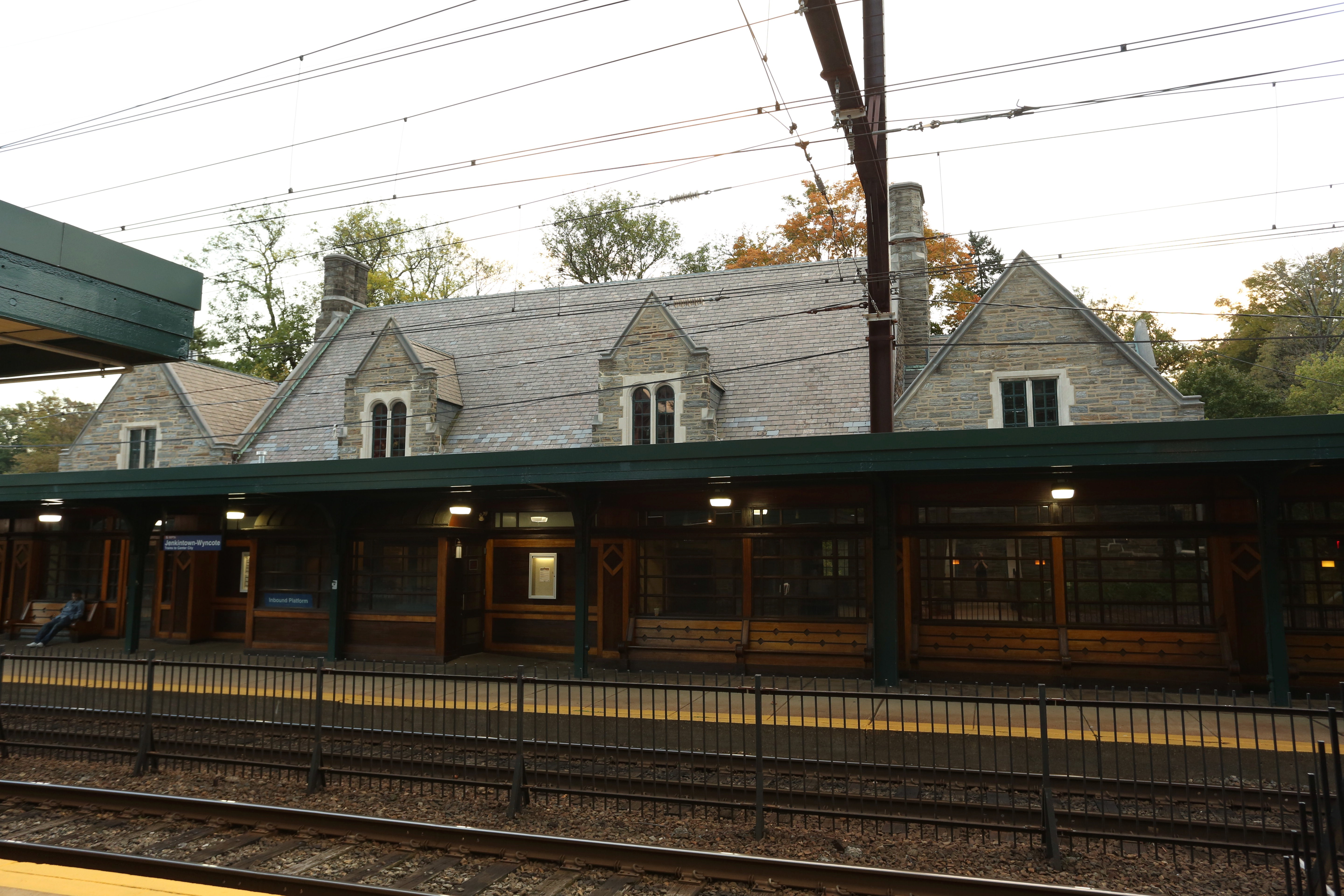
- Station building located adjacent to inbound platform

General information
- Location: 2 Greenwood Avenue; Jenkintown, Pennsylvania, U.S.
- Owner: SEPTA
- Lines: Neshaminy Line; SEPTA Main Line
- Platforms: 2 side platforms
- Tracks: 2
- Connections: SEPTA City Bus: 77

Construction
- Parking: 430-space parking lot
- Cycle facilities: Yes
- Accessible: No, planned

Other information
- Fare zone: 3

History
- Opened: 1859 (NPRR)
- Rebuilt: March 24, 1932 (Reading)
- Electrified: July 26, 1931
- Former names: Jenkintown

Passengers
- 2017: 1,246 boardings 1,702 alightings (weekday average)
- Rank: 9 of 146

Services
Preceding station	SEPTA	Following station
Elkins Park toward Airport	Airport Line	Glenside Terminus
Fern Rock toward Penn Medicine Station	Lansdale/Doylestown Line	Glenside toward Doylestown
Elkins Park toward Penn Medicine Station	Warminster Line	Glenside toward Warminster
Elkins Park toward Penn Medicine Station	West Trenton Line	Noble toward West Trenton
Fern Rock toward Penn Medicine Station	West Trenton Line (weekends and major holidays)	Noble toward West Trenton
Former services
Preceding station	Reading Railroad	Following station
Elkins Park toward Philadelphia	New York Branch	Noble toward Bound Brook
Elkins Park toward Philadelphia	Bethlehem Branch	Glenside toward Bethlehem
Wayne Junction toward Philadelphia	New Hope Branch	Glenside toward New Hope
Preceding station	Baltimore and Ohio Railroad	Following station
Wayne Junction toward Philadelphia: Chestnut St. or Reading Terminal	Philadelphia – Jersey City Local	West Trenton toward Jersey City
- Jenkintown Wyncote Station
- U.S. National Register of Historic Places
- U.S. Historic district – Contributing property
- Interactive map of Jenkintown Wyncote Station
- Location: Wyncote, Pennsylvania, USA
- Coordinates: 40°5′35.52″N 75°8′16.8″W
- Built: 1872
- Architect: Horace Trumbauer
- Architectural style: Queen Anne
- Part of: Wyncote Historic District (ID86002884)
- NRHP reference No.: 14001103

Significant dates
- Added to NRHP: December 29, 2014
- Designated CP: October 16, 1986
Location

Jenkintown–Wyncote station (originally Jenkintown station) is a major SEPTA Regional Rail station along the SEPTA Main Line in Montgomery County, Pennsylvania. It is located at the intersection of Greenwood Avenue and West Avenue on the border of Jenkintown borough and the Wyncote neighborhood of Cheltenham Township, Pennsylvania, with a mailing address in Jenkintown. It is the ninth-busiest station in the regional rail system, and the fourth busiest outside Center City. Despite this, the station is not wheelchair accessible. SEPTA had plans to make the station wheelchair accessible by 2020, but these have not yet been completed.

== Station ==
Jenkintown–Wyncote station was built in 1872 by the North Pennsylvania Railroad, and replaced in 1932 by the Reading Railroad. Designed by well-known Gilded Age architect Horace Trumbauer, the station remains in use to this day, and was listed on the National Register of Historic Places in 2014. It is a Regional Rail junction, served by three SEPTA lines (Lansdale/Doylestown, Warminster, and West Trenton) along with service to and from Philadelphia International Airport. There is a 450-space parking lot. The West Trenton Line branches off of the SEPTA Main Line at this station. In 2024, plans for upgrades to the station were announced.

== Service ==
This station is served by the Lansdale/Doylestown Line, Warminster Line, and West Trenton Line. These three rail lines make Jenkintown-Wyncote the ninth-busiest station in SEPTA's Regional Rail system, and the third-busiest outside the City of Philadelphia, with 1,246 average weekday boardings and 1,702 average weekday alightings in FY 2017.

== Station layout ==
Jenkintown–Wyncote has two low-level side platforms connected by a tunnel underneath the tracks. The ticket office and a small waiting area with heating and air conditioning are on the inbound side, and an unheated indoor waiting area is on the outbound side. Jenkintown's West Avenue runs along the outbound side, and the inbound side of the station borders parking, Ralph Morgan Park, and Glenside Avenue in Wyncote.

== Gallery ==
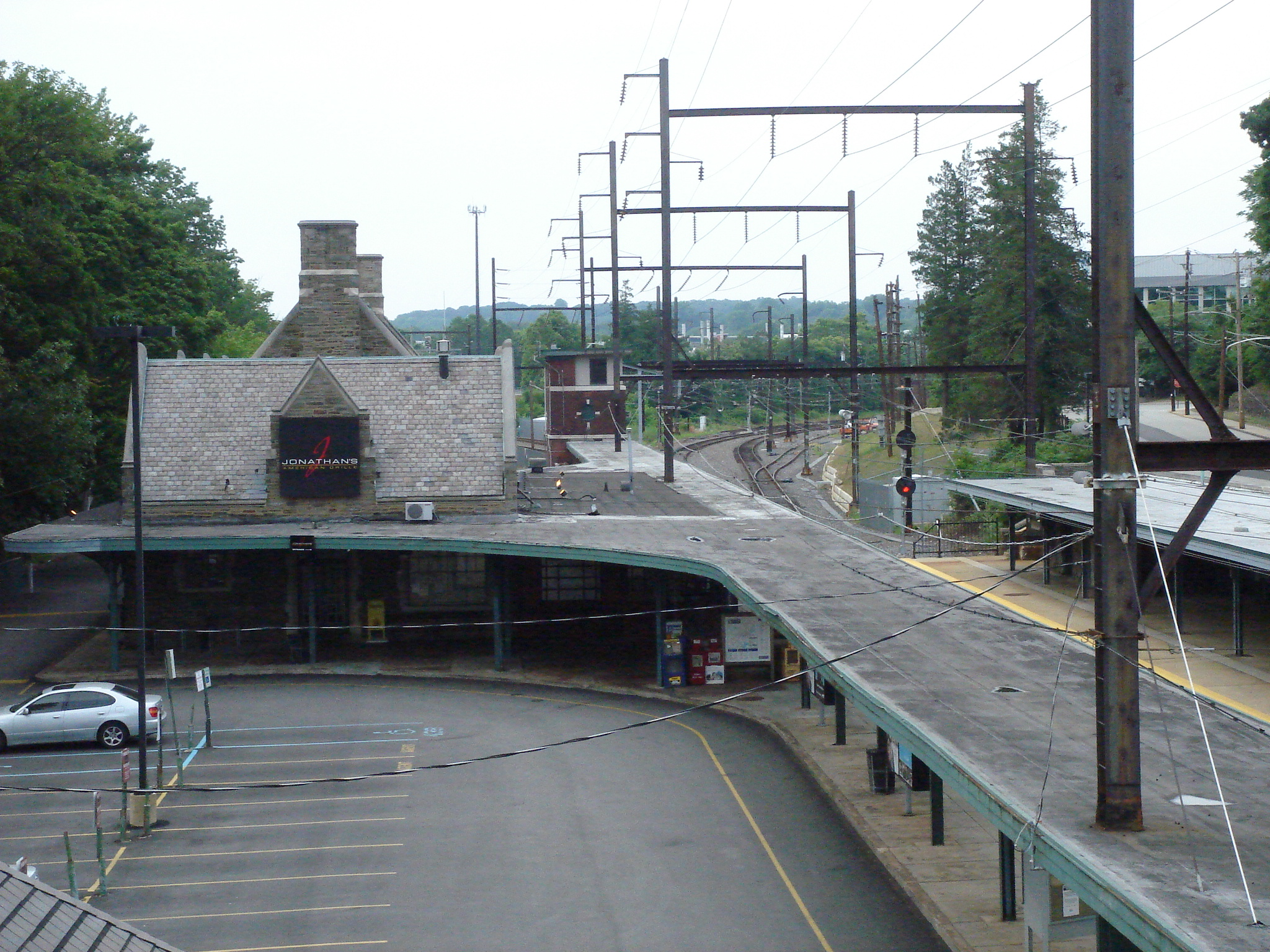
The station building on the inbound side houses a ticket office and small waiting area. A larger space, formerly a passenger lounge, was most recently a restaurant and is now unoccupied.

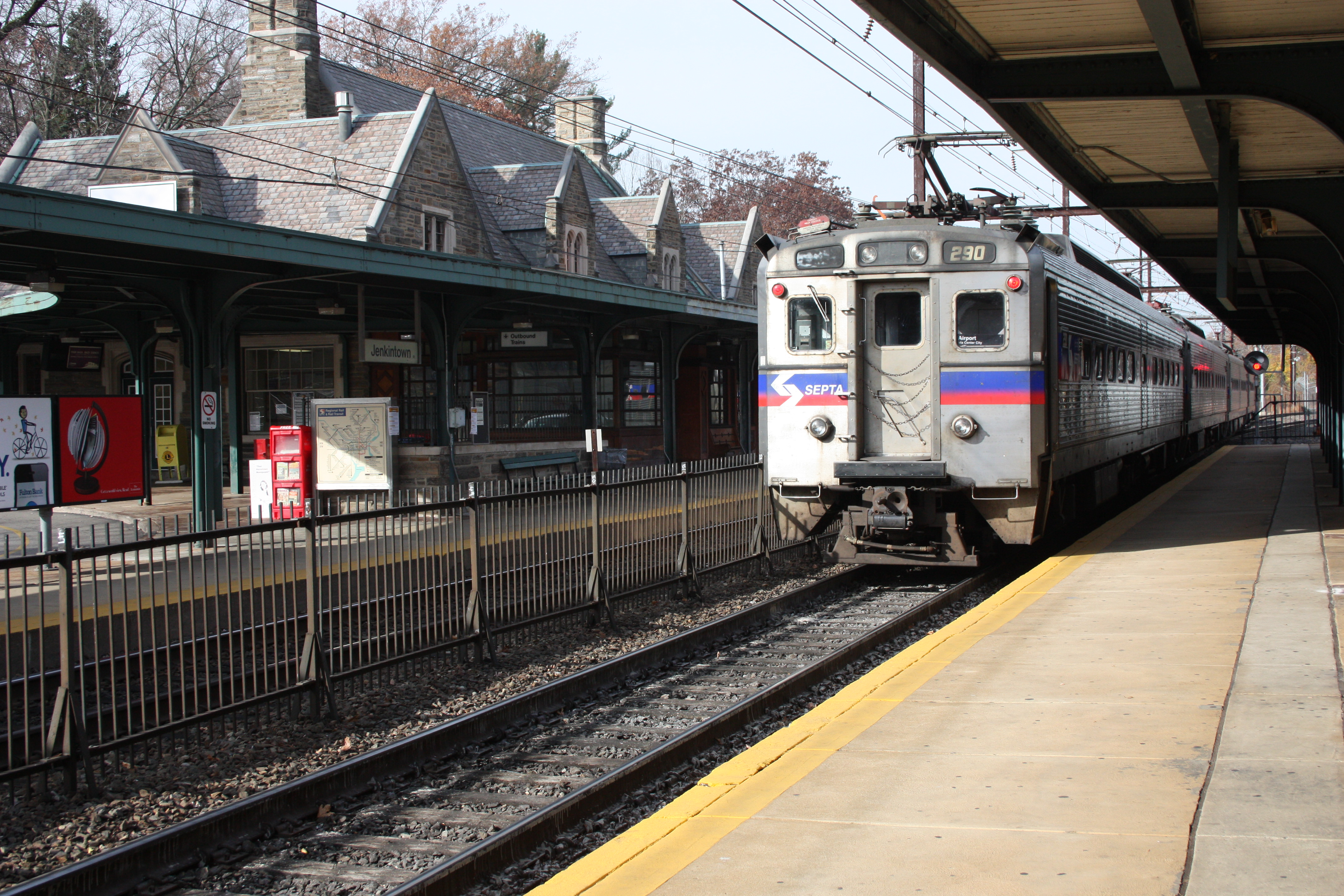
Train at Jenkintown–Wyncote station in November 2013

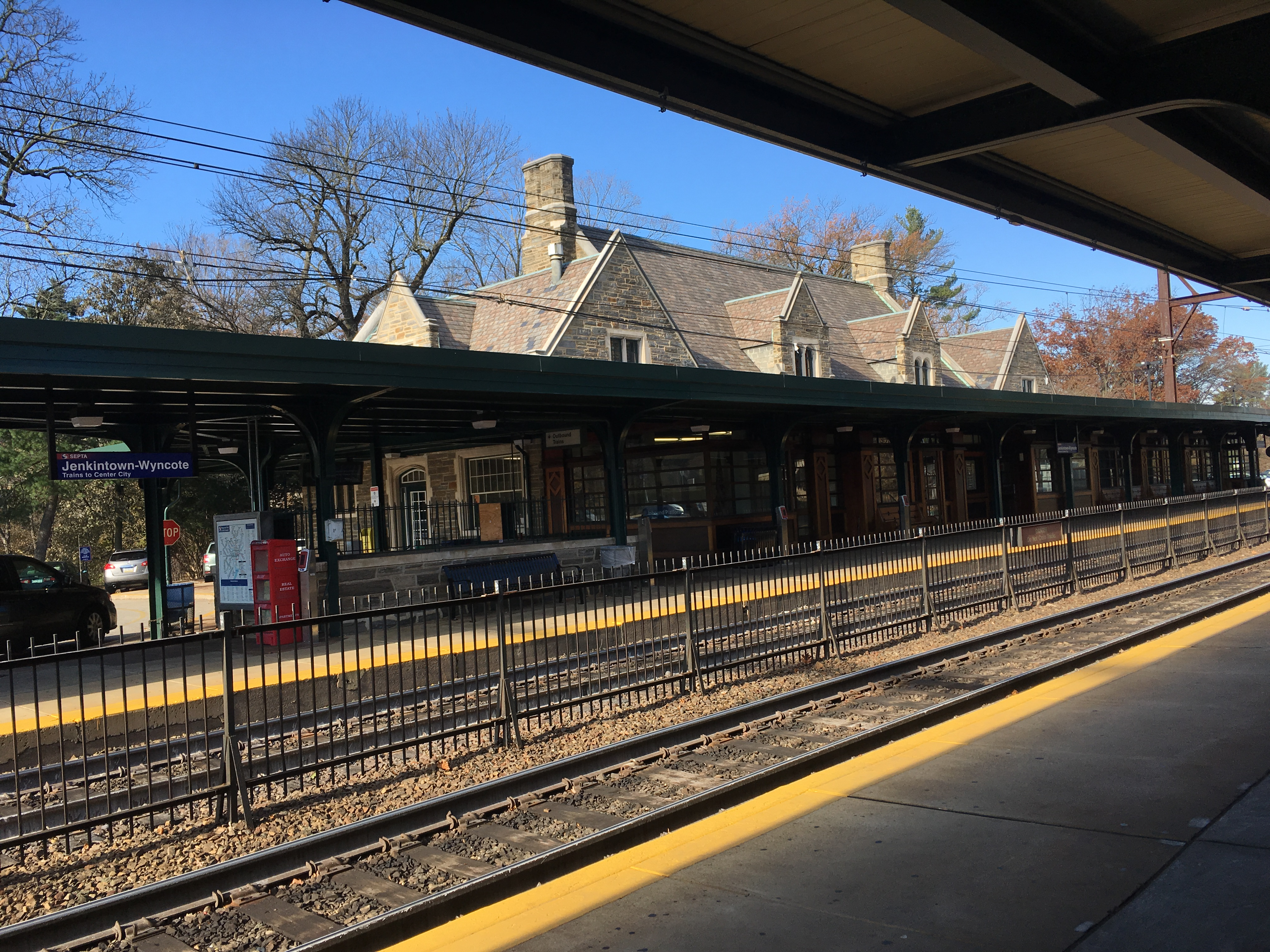
View of Jenkintown–Wyncote station from outbound platform

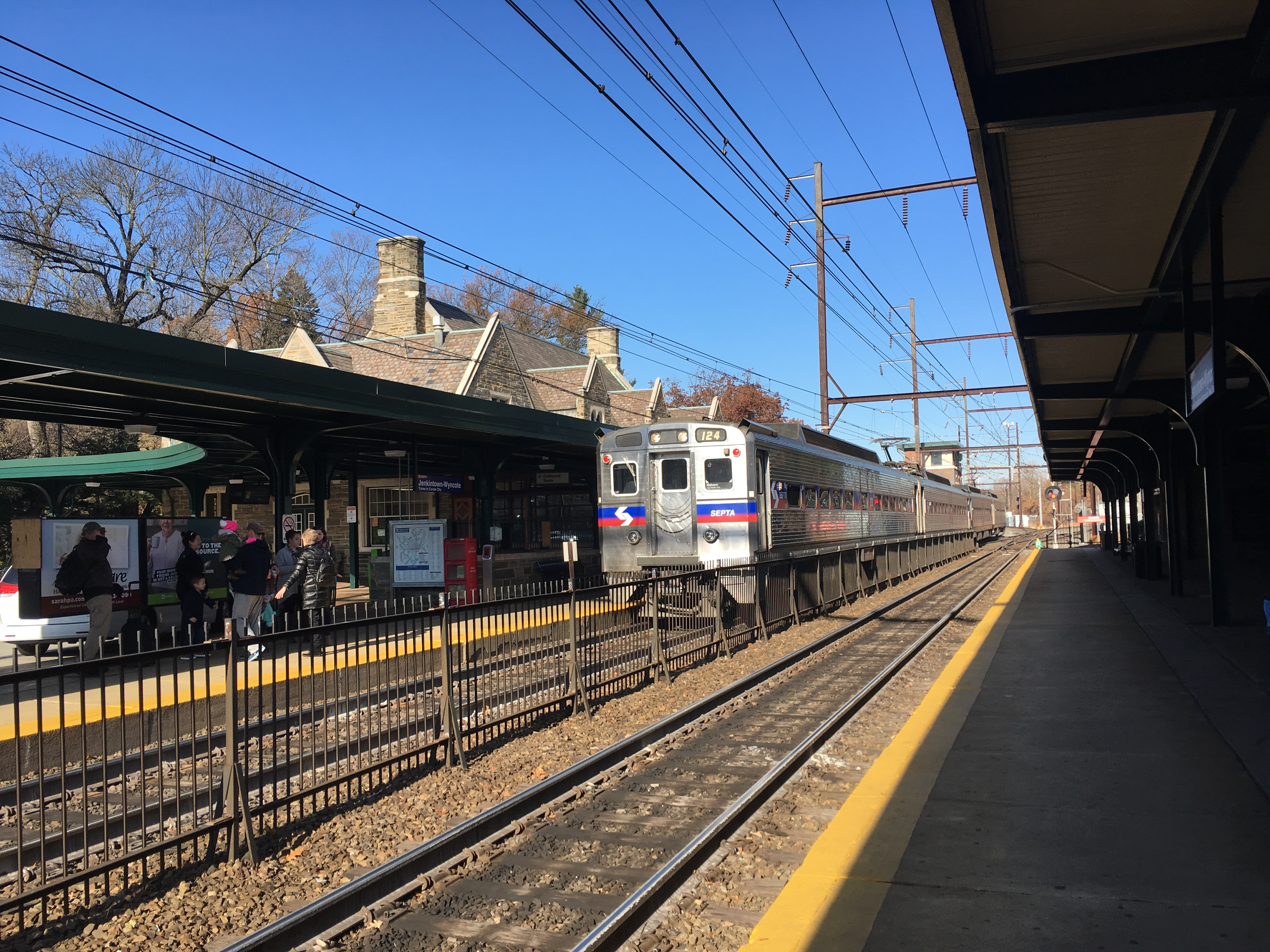
A Center City-bound train on the Lansdale/Doylestown Line stops at Jenkintown–Wyncote station in November 2017

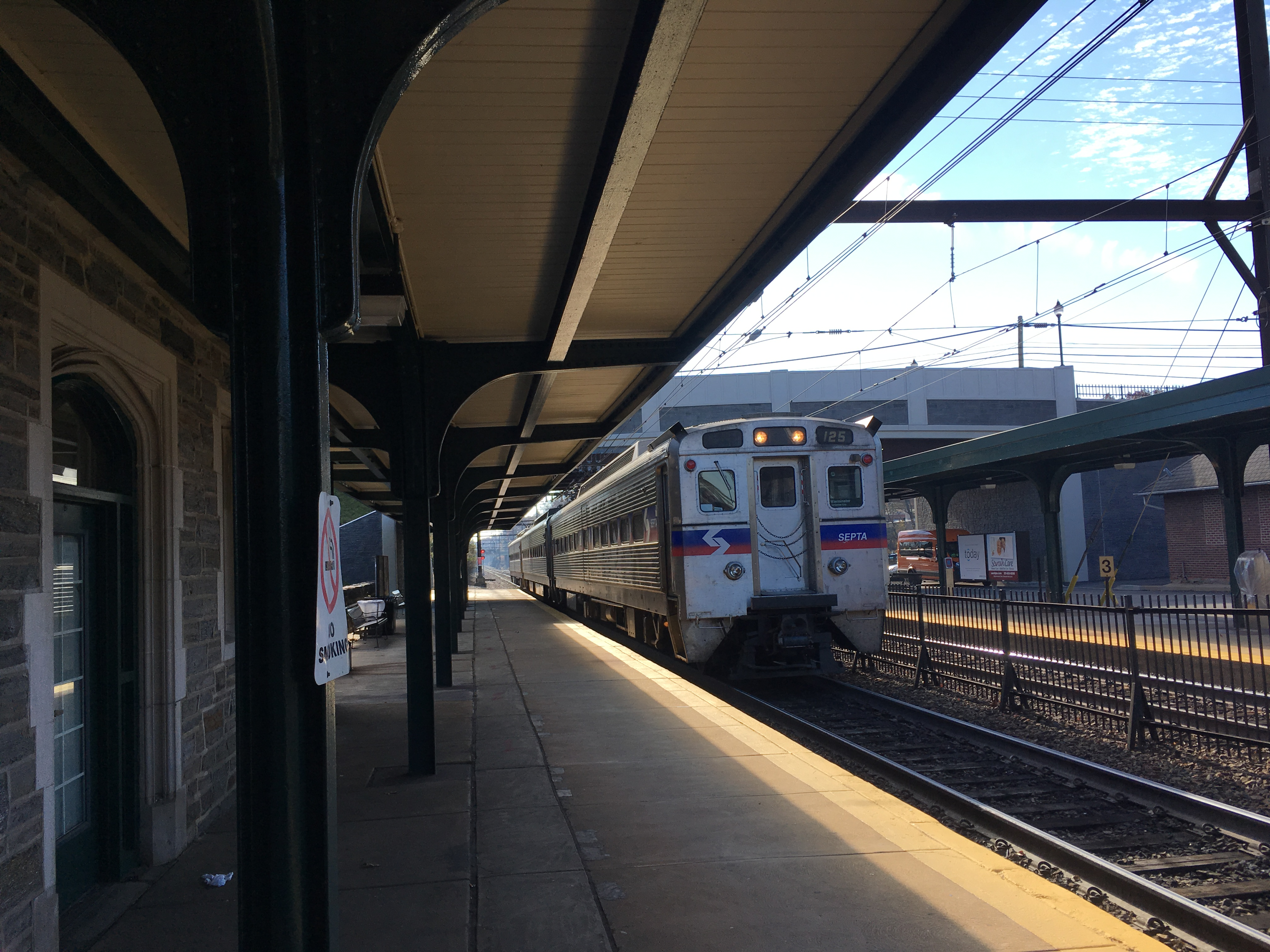
A Warminster-bound train on the Warminster Line stops at Jenkintown–Wyncote station in November 2017

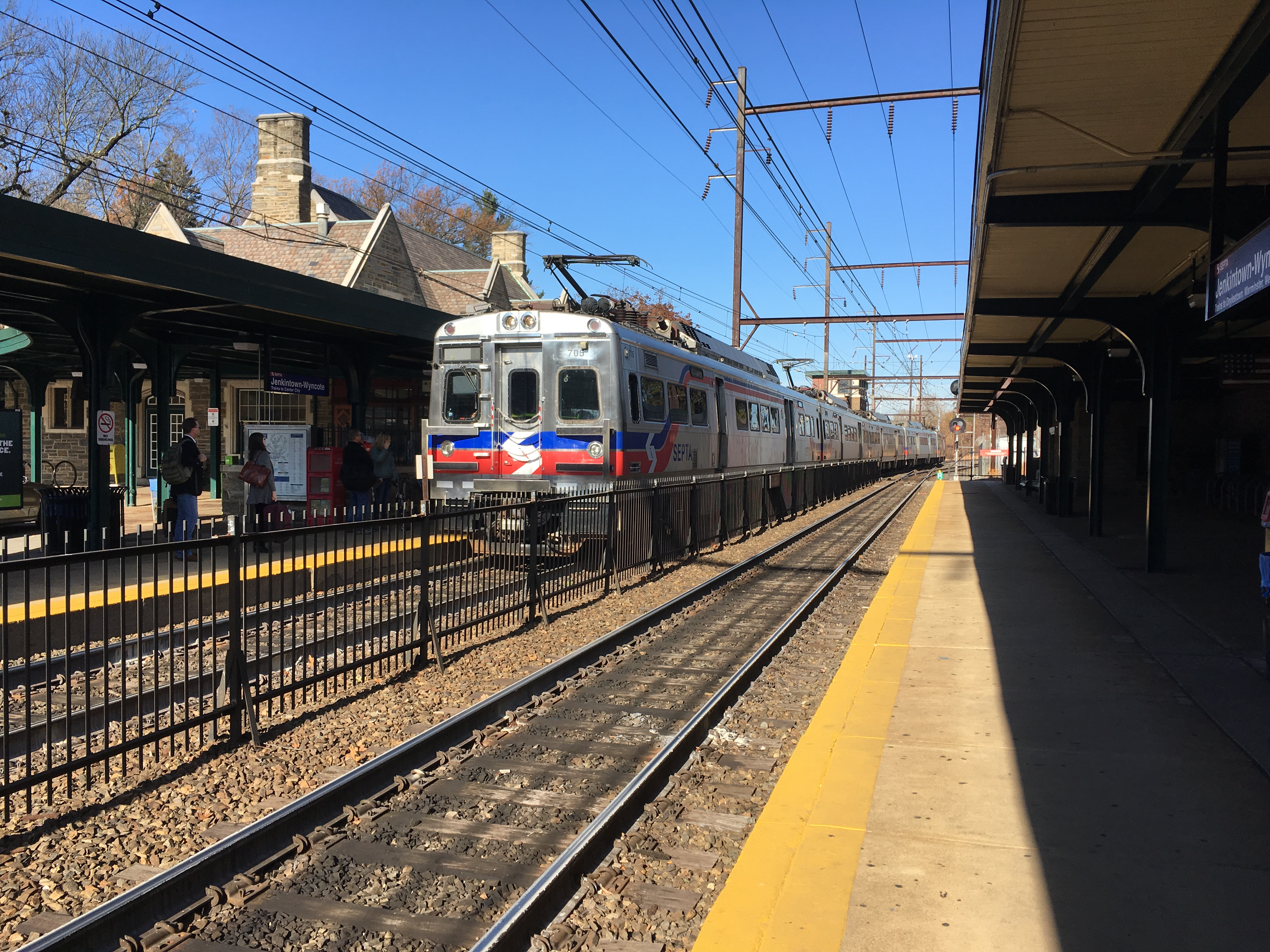
A Center City-bound train on the West Trenton Line stops at Jenkintown–Wyncote station in November 2017

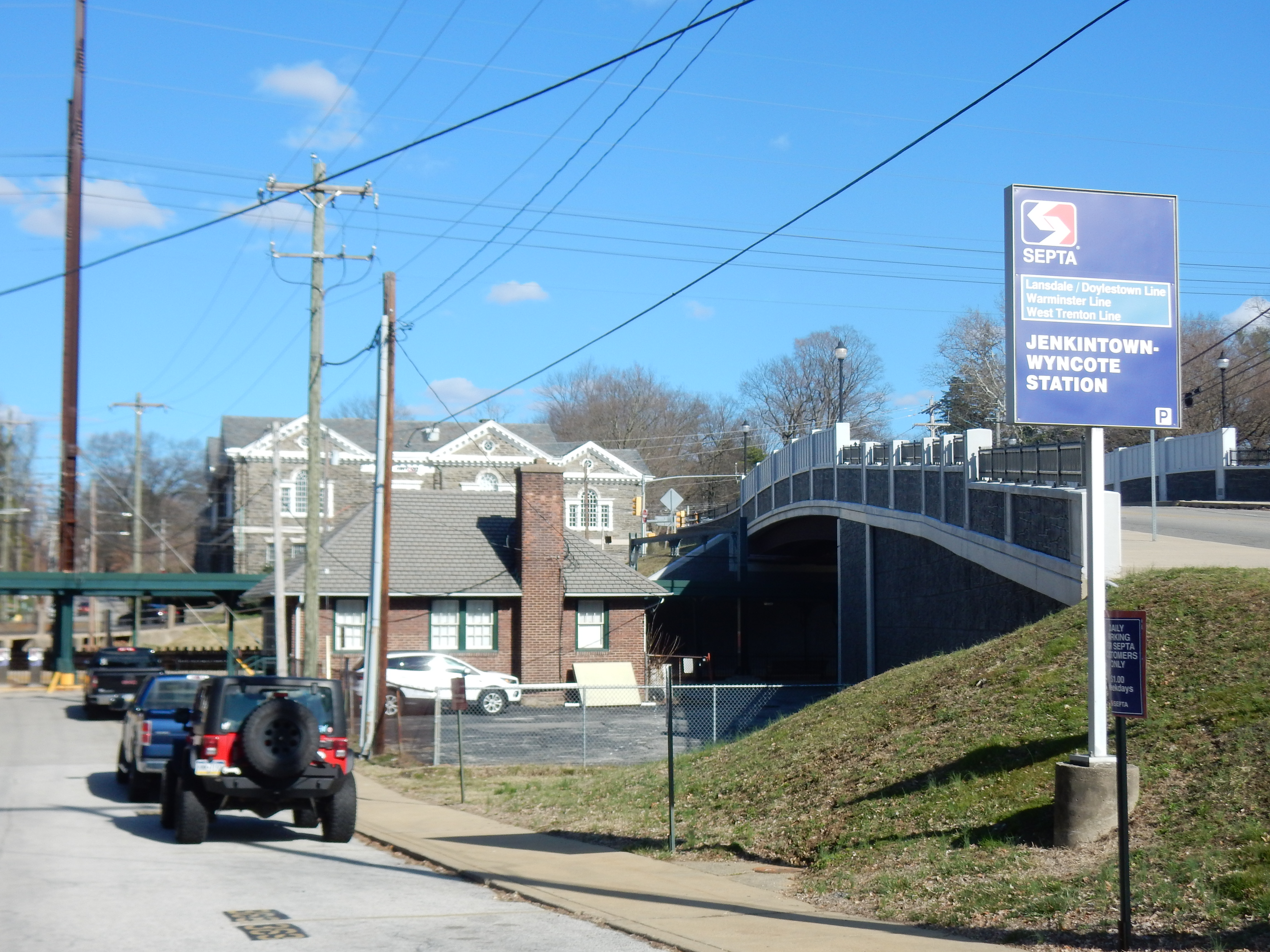
Honorable Lawrence H. Curry Bridge, spanning the rail lines at Greenwood Avenue and connecting Jenkintown and Wyncote
