= North Hills station =

SEPTA Regional Rail station

North Hills
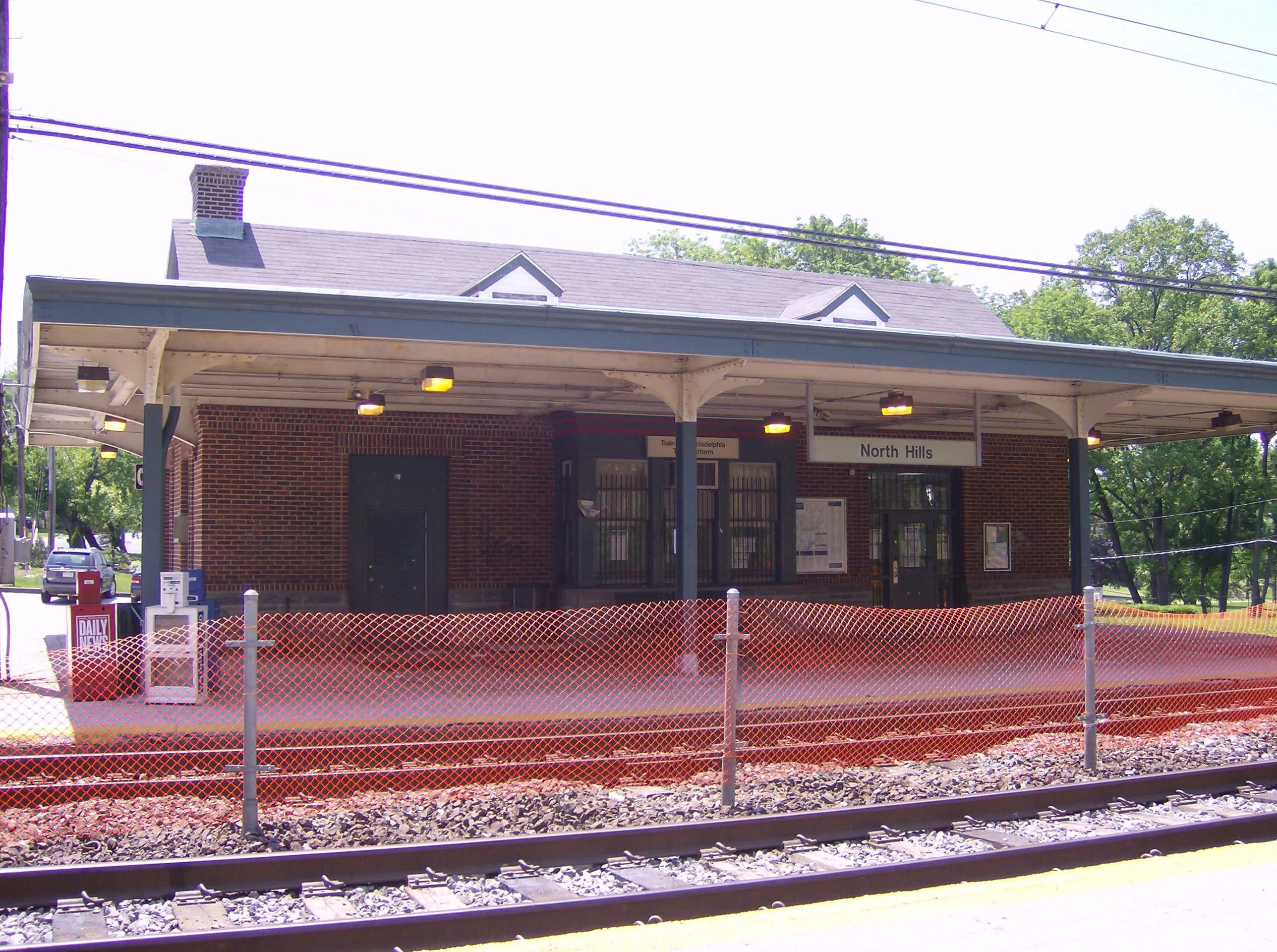

General information
- Location: Station & Mount Carmel Avenues; North Hills, PA 19038
- Coordinates: 40.1122°N 75.1699°W
- Owner: SEPTA
- Line: SEPTA Main Line
- Platforms: 2 side platforms
- Tracks: 2

Construction
- Platform levels: 1
- Parking: 147 spaces
- Accessible: No

Other information
- Fare zone: 3

History
- Opened: July 2, 1855
- Electrified: July 26, 1931
- Former names: Edge Hill; North Glenside

Key dates
- 1978: Station agent eliminated

Services
Preceding station	SEPTA	Following station
Glenside toward Penn Medicine Station	Lansdale/Doylestown Line	Oreland toward Doylestown
Former services
Preceding station	Reading Railroad	Following station
Glenside toward Philadelphia	Bethlehem Branch	Oreland toward Bethlehem
Location

North Hills station is a station along the SEPTA Lansdale/Doylestown Line. The station, located in SEPTA Fare Zone 3 at the intersection of Station and Mount Carmel Avenues, includes a 147-space parking lot. In FY 2013, North Hills station had a weekday average of 202 boardings and 219 alightings.

The station was originally known as Edge Hill and was part of the original North Pennsylvania Railroad route between Philadelphia and Gwynedd Valley, Pennsylvania. Service began over this line on July 2, 1855.

== Station layout ==
North Hills has two low-level side platforms.
