= Oreland station =

Railway station in Pennsylvania

Oreland
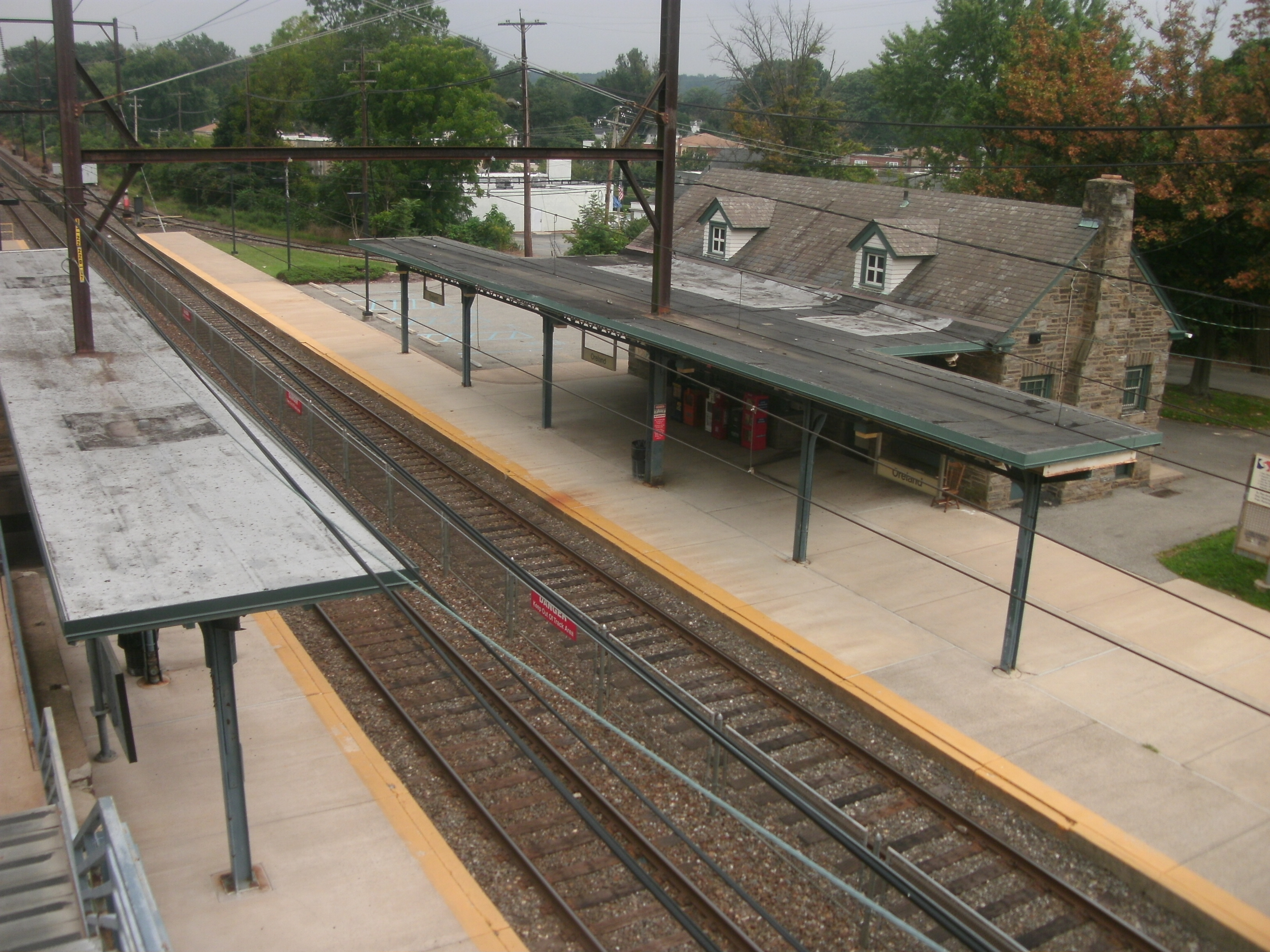
- Oreland station in September 2012

General information
- Location: Bridge Street & Pennsylvania Avenue; Oreland, PA 19075
- Coordinates: 40.1181°N 75.1839°W
- Owner: SEPTA
- Line: SEPTA Main Line
- Platforms: 2 side platforms
- Tracks: 2

Construction
- Platform levels: 1
- Parking: Yes
- Accessible: No

Other information
- Fare zone: 3

History
- Opened: 1890
- Rebuilt: July 26, 1931

Services
Preceding station	SEPTA	Following station
North Hills toward Penn Medicine Station	Lansdale/Doylestown Line	Fort Washington toward Doylestown
North Hills toward Penn Medicine Station	Lansdale/Doylestown Line	Fellwick Closed 1996 toward Doylestown
Former services
Preceding station	Reading Railroad	Following station
North Hills toward Philadelphia	Bethlehem Branch	Fellwick toward Bethlehem
Flourtown toward Conshohocken	Plymouth Branch	Terminus
Location

Oreland station is a railroad station along the SEPTA Lansdale/Doylestown Line near Philadelphia, Pennsylvania, United States. The station, located at the intersection of Bridge Street and Bruce Road, includes a 99-space parking lot.

In FY 2013, Oreland station had a weekday average of 276 boardings and 256 alightings.

The current station was built by the Reading Railroad (RDG) in 1931, as a replacement for a station built in 1890.

== Station layout ==
Oreland has two low-level side platforms.
