= Fort Washington station =

Railway station in Fort Washington, Pennsylvania

Fort Washington
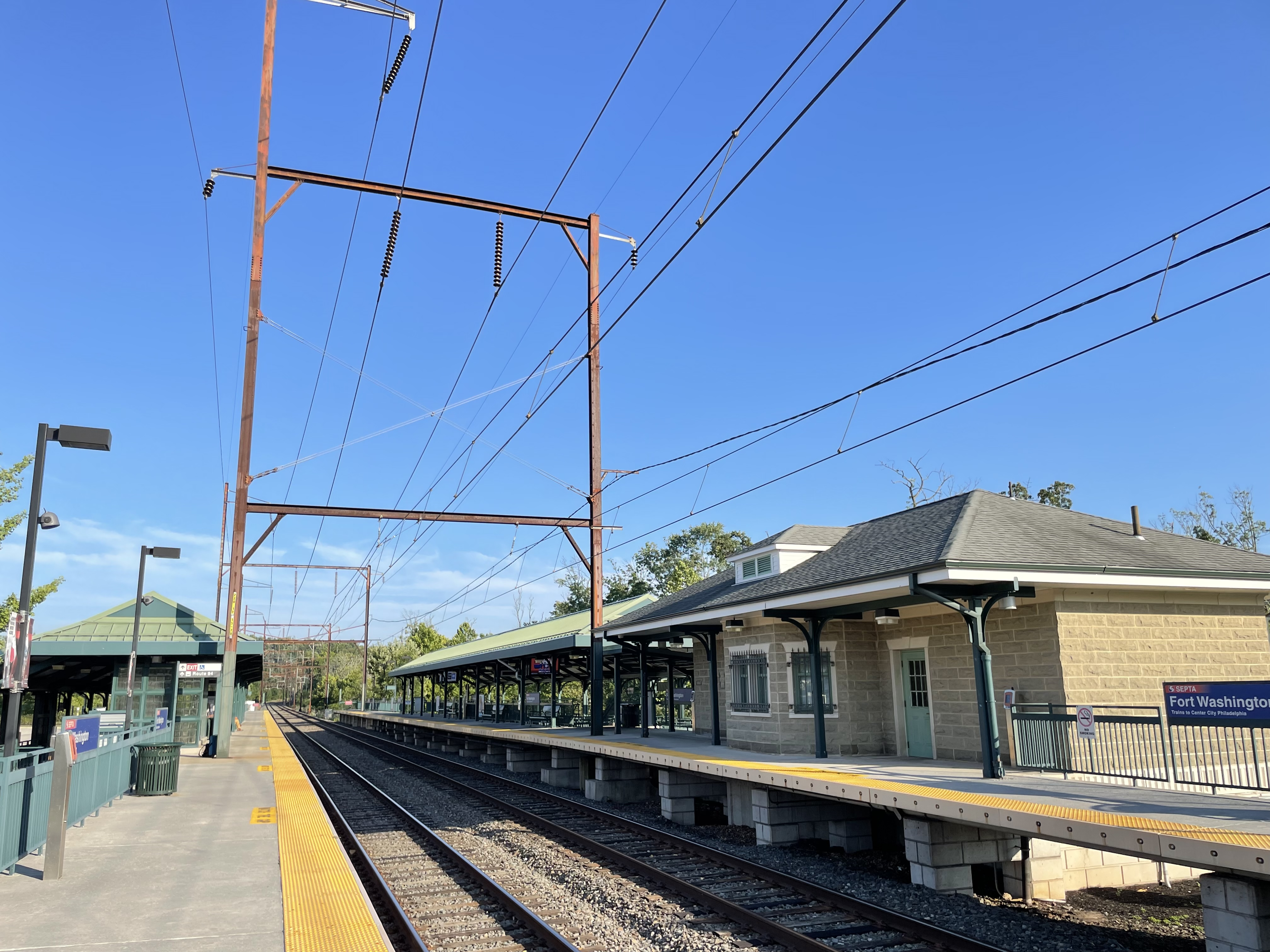
- The current high-level platform station at Fort Washington, August 2022

General information
- Location: 7250 Summit Avenue (Bethlehem Pike & Station Avenue); Fort Washington, Pennsylvania 19034
- Coordinates: 40.1354°N 75.2115°W
- Owner: SEPTA
- Line: SEPTA Main Line
- Platforms: 2 side platforms
- Tracks: 2
- Connections: SEPTA Suburban Bus: 94, 95, 201 h.o.p.s. OurBus

Construction
- Structure type: elevated
- Platform levels: 1
- Parking: Yes
- Cycle facilities: Yes
- Accessible: Yes

Other information
- Fare zone: 3

History
- Opened: 1903
- Electrified: July 26, 1931

Passengers
- 2017: 1,125 boardings 875 alightings (weekday average)
- Rank: 14 of 146

Services
Preceding station	SEPTA	Following station
Oreland toward Penn Medicine Station	Lansdale/Doylestown Line	Ambler toward Doylestown
Fellwick Closed 1996 toward Penn Medicine Station	Lansdale/Doylestown Line	Ambler toward Doylestown
Former services
Preceding station	Reading Railroad	Following station
Fellwick toward Philadelphia	Bethlehem Branch	Ambler toward Bethlehem
Location

Fort Washington station is a station along the SEPTA Lansdale/Doylestown Line. The station is located at the intersection of Bethlehem Pike and Station Avenue in the Fort Washington section of Whitemarsh Township, Pennsylvania. It is also served by SEPTA Bus Routes 94, 95, and 201, as well as OurBus intercity buses to New York City. The station includes a 585-space parking lot.

Originally built in 1903 by the Reading Company, the current station was built 300 feet to the south with high-level platforms, a new ticket office, a larger waiting room, and a bathroom as well as a massive parking lot. The expansion was completed in 2008.

In FY 2017, Fort Washington station had a weekday average of 1,125 boardings and 875 alightings. The first train from the station leaves at 5:32 A.M, while the last train arrives at the station at 1:10 A.M. The station is considered a major station on the Lansdale/Doylestown Line because most of the express trains stop at this station, before skipping many other intermediate stations on the line. Only one train, an express from Center City Philadelphia to North Wales skips this station. During the morning and afternoon peak hour, many trains operate to Center City as expresses, proceeding direct from Fort Washington station to Temple University station. Throughout midday, and the later hours of the night, most trains are locals.

== Station layout ==
Fort Washington has two high-level side platforms.
