= Fellwick station =

Railway station in Springfield Township, Pennsylvania

Fellwick
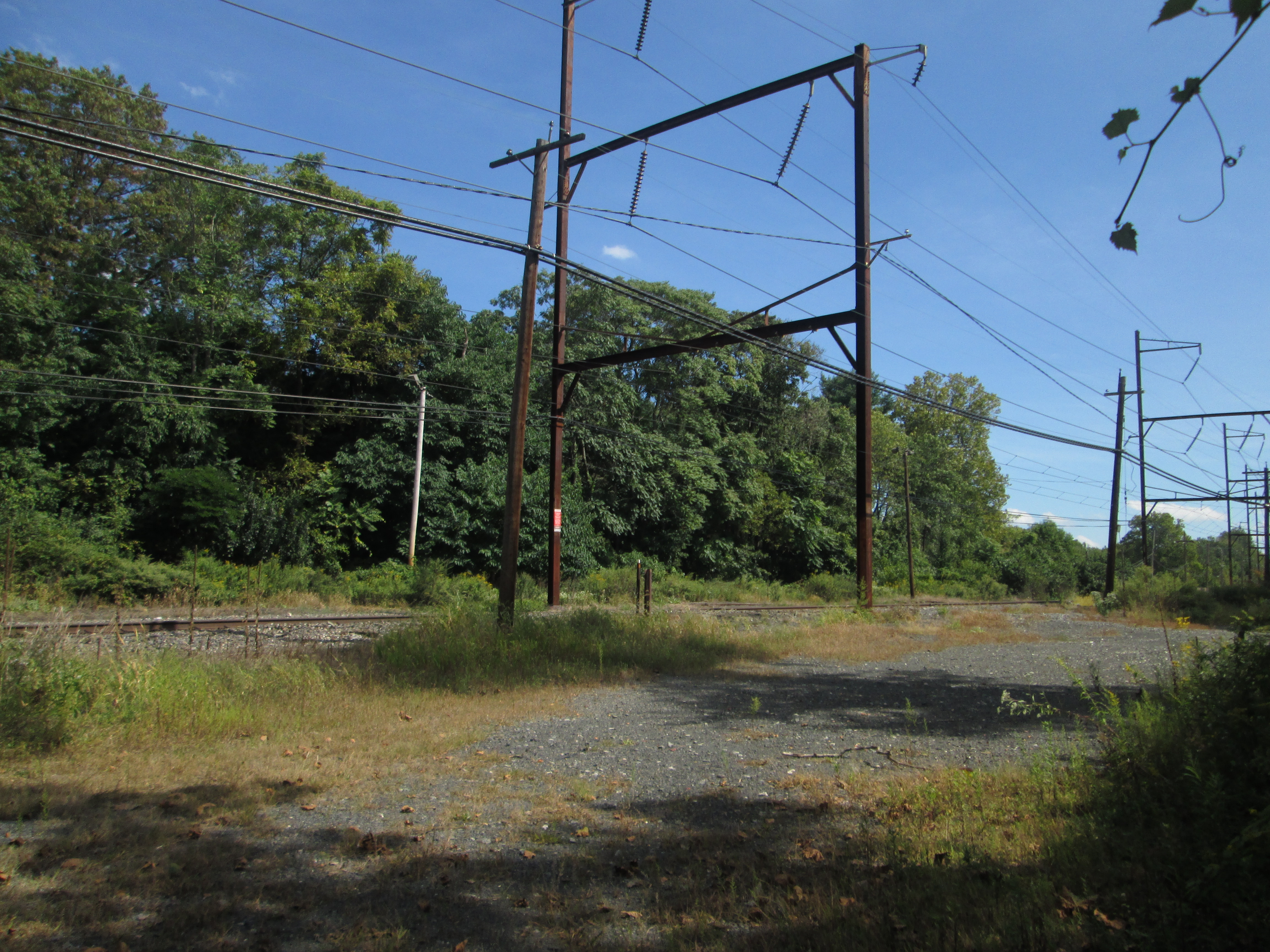
- Fellwick station site in September 2013

General information
- Location: Camp Hill Road and Walnut Avenue; Springfield Township, Pennsylvania, U.S.
- Coordinates: 40.124528°N 75.199395°W
- Line: SEPTA Main Line
- Platforms: 1 side platform
- Tracks: 2

History
- Opened: 1855
- Closed: November 10, 1996
- Electrified: July 26, 1931
- Former names: Sandy Run (1855–1884); Camp Hill (1884–1931); Sellwick (1931–)

Former services
Preceding station	SEPTA	Following station
Oreland toward Penn Medicine Station	Lansdale/Doylestown Line	Fort Washington toward Doylestown
Preceding station	Reading Railroad	Following station
Oreland toward Philadelphia	Bethlehem Branch	Fort Washington toward Bethlehem
Location

Fellwick station was a SEPTA Regional Rail station in Springfield Township, Montgomery County, Pennsylvania. Located near the intersection of Camp Hill and Walnut Avenue, Fellwick was a station on the R5 Lansdale/Doylestown Line. Opened originally in 1855 as Sandy Run, Fellwick station was the site of the Great Train Wreck of 1856, which claimed the lives of approximately 60 people. The station was renamed Camp Hill in March 1884, then changed to Sellwick on February 16, 1931 because the White Hill station in Camp Hill was renamed Camp Hill. The station was later renamed Fellwick. SEPTA closed the station on November 10, 1996 as part of several service cuts due to low ridership; that year the station only averaged eight riders per day.
