= Eastwick station =

SEPTA train station in Eastwick, Philadelphia, Pennsylvania, United States

Eastwick
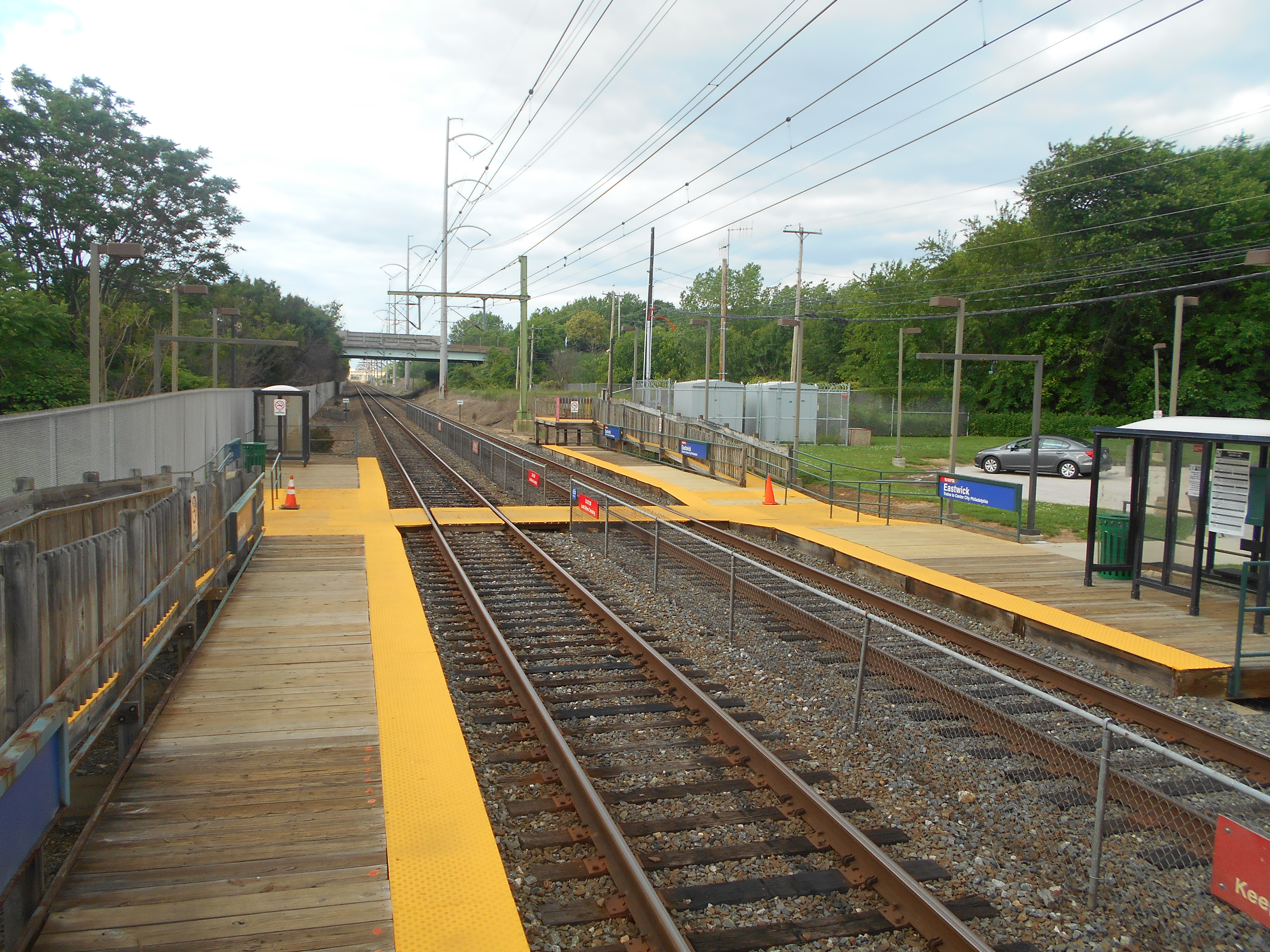
- Eastwick station in June 2014, after signage was replaced.

General information
- Location: 8438 Bartram Avenue (PA 291); Philadelphia, PA
- Coordinates: 39.8917°N 75.2450°W
- Owner: SEPTA
- Line: Airport Line
- Platforms: 2 side platforms
- Tracks: 2
- Connections: SEPTA Metro: (Note: This is a proposed connection and isn't currently a connection.); SEPTA City Bus: 37, 68; SEPTA Suburban Bus: 108, 115

Construction
- Structure type: Surface
- Accessible: yes

Other information
- Fare zone: 1

History
- Opened: 1997

Passengers
- 2017: 354 boardings 400 alightings (weekday average)
- Rank: 78 of 146

Services
Preceding station	SEPTA	Following station
Airport Terminus	Airport Line	Penn Medicine Station toward Glenside
Location

Eastwick station is a SEPTA Regional Rail station in Philadelphia. It serves the Airport Line to Philadelphia International Airport. Eastwick has two low-level side platforms with a connecting walkway across the tracks. Located below 84th Street and situated between Mario Lanza Boulevard and Bartram Avenue (PA 291), it is the sole stop between central Philadelphia and the Philadelphia International Airport Terminals. In 2013, this station saw 367 boardings and 421 alightings on an average weekday. The station is accessed from Interstate 95 northbound via exit 10 and southbound via exit 12B.

Access to the station is granted via a cul-de-sac off of Bartram Avenue and also from Mario Lanza Boulevard. Pedestrians and drivers coming from 84th Street must use either Crane Street to Lanza Boulevard or 84th to south on Bartram. While the station has no official SEPTA parking lot, a number of parking spaces along Mario Lanza Boulevard and Crane Street are used by commuters patronizing the stop.

Eastwick station, located along the original Philadelphia, Wilmington and Baltimore Railroad main line, was conceived as 84th Street, under which name (as "proposed") it appeared on 1984 SEPTA informational maps. The present minimalist station was erected in 1997 in order to serve newly built local office parks as quickly as possible. SEPTA, along with the City of Philadelphia, plans to expand the station, transforming it into the Eastwick Transportation Center.

When the station opened, it was a Zone 2 station. On July 1, 2013, SEPTA changed Eastwick to a Zone 1 station in conjunction with a fare increase and zone realignment. On the same day, the airport stations changed from Zone 5 to Zone 4.
