= Wyncote =

Wyncote may refer to:

- Wyncote, Pennsylvania
- Wyncote Records, a short-lived subsidiary of Cameo-Parkway Records
- Wyncote station, a railway line located in Jenkintown, Pennsylvania
