= Glenside station =

SEPTA Regional Rail station

Glenside
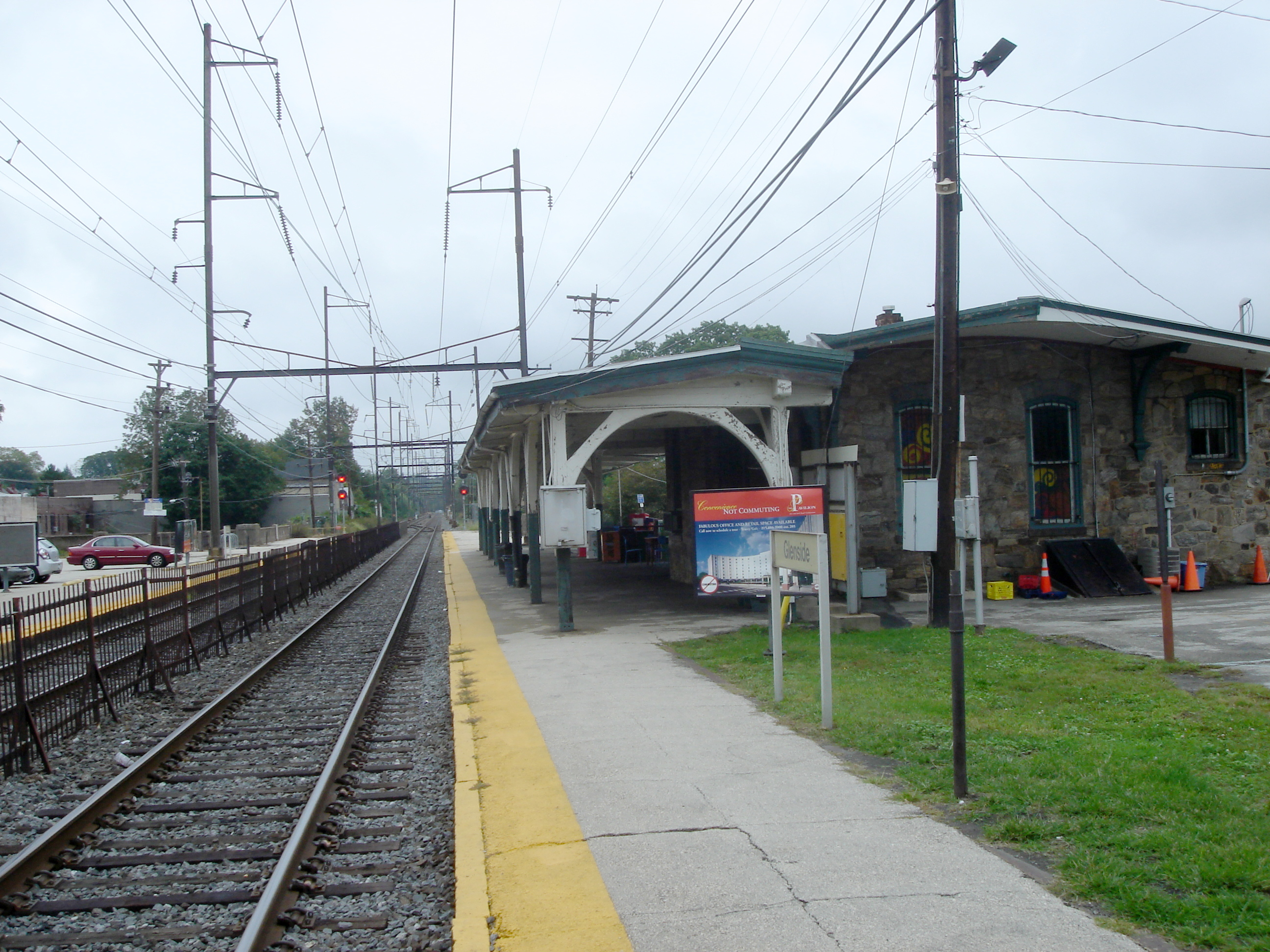
- Glenside station in Glenside, Pennsylvania

General information
- Location: 5 West Glenside Avenue (Easton Road & Glenside Avenue); Glenside, Pennsylvania, 19038
- Coordinates: 40°06′04″N 075°09′15″W
- Owner: SEPTA
- Lines: SEPTA Main Line; Warminster Branch
- Platforms: 2 side platforms
- Tracks: 2
- Connections: SEPTA City Bus: 22, 77

Construction
- Platform levels: 1
- Parking: 167 space parking lot
- Cycle facilities: 8 racks, 16 spaces
- Accessible: No

Other information
- Fare zone: 3

History
- Electrified: July 26, 1931

Passengers
- 2017: 1,213 boardings 942 alightings (weekday average)
- Rank: 12 of 146

Services
Preceding station	SEPTA	Following station
Jenkintown–Wyncote toward Airport	Airport Line	Terminus
Jenkintown–Wyncote toward Penn Medicine Station	Lansdale/Doylestown Line	North Hills toward Doylestown
Jenkintown–Wyncote toward Penn Medicine Station	Warminster Line	Ardsley toward Warminster
Former services
Preceding station	Reading Railroad	Following station
Jenkintown toward Philadelphia	Bethlehem Branch	North Hills toward Bethlehem
Jenkintown toward Philadelphia	New Hope Branch	Ardsley toward New Hope
Location

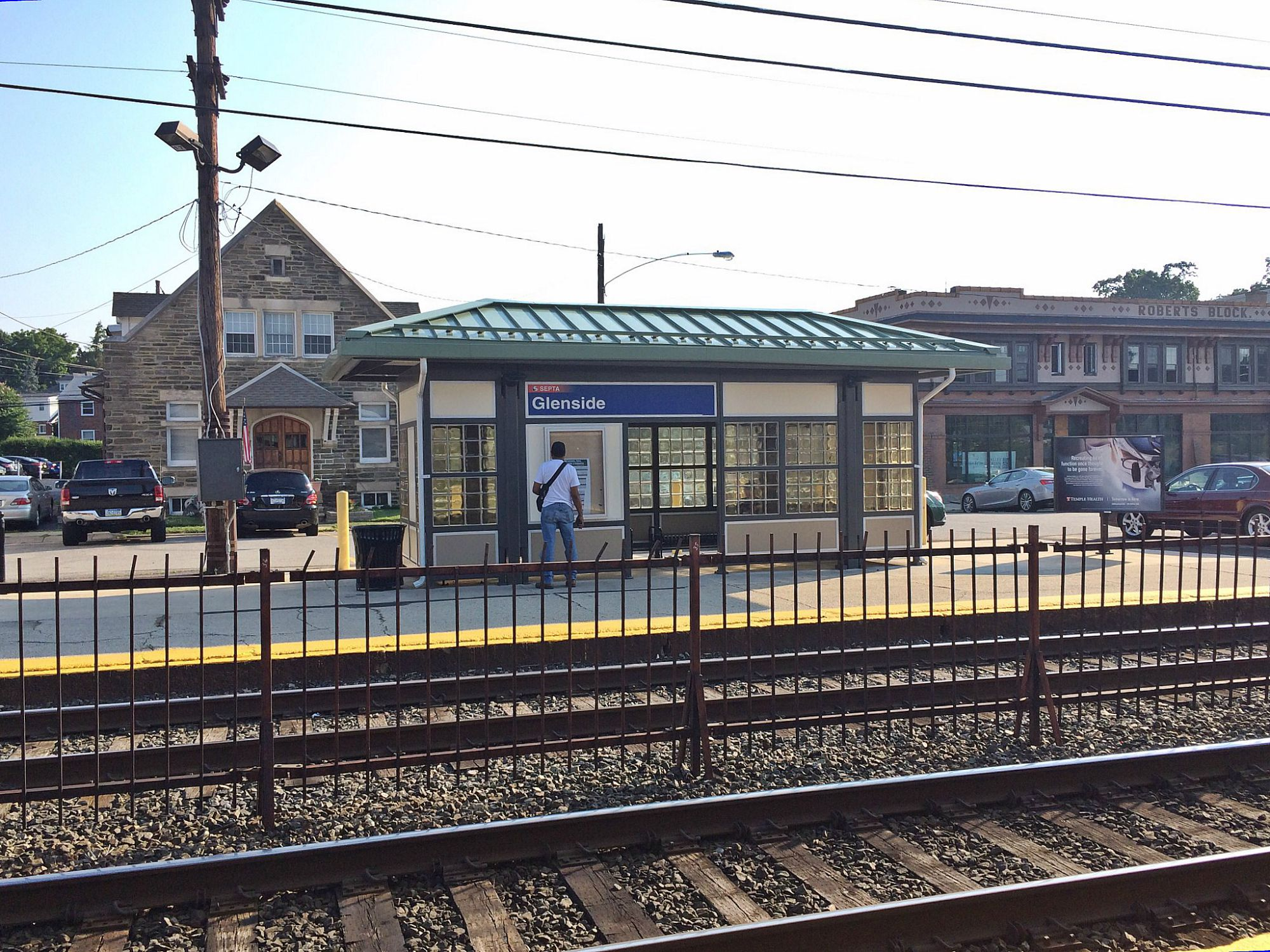
The outbound platform at Glenside station

Glenside station is a SEPTA Regional Rail station along the SEPTA Main Line, located at the intersection of Easton Road and Glenside Avenue in Glenside, Pennsylvania. It is served by the Warminster Line and the Lansdale/Doylestown Line, both of which split at Carmel Junction immediately west of Glenside station. The station is not wheelchair-accessible, but has a ticket office. The first train from the station departs at 4:29 A.M, while the last train arrives at the station at 1:03 A.M. The station is relatively busy with a train arriving at least every 30 minutes, even at non-peak hours.

Glenside is also well-served by the Airport Line, as the majority of Warminster Line trains run through to and from Philadelphia International Airport. A few Airport Line trains originate or terminate at Glenside, often using the siding at the west end of the inbound platform.

In 2013, the station had 1064 average weekday boardings and 1,197 average weekday alightings.

There is a ticket office and waiting room at Glenside, which is open on weekdays and sells tickets until early afternoon. An espresso bar named Elcy's Cafe has been operating in the station since 2000.

== Station layout ==
Glenside has two low-level side platforms.
