= Airport Terminal stations (SEPTA) =

SEPTA train stations at Philadelphia International Airport

Coordinates: 39.878844°N 75.24019°W

Airport Terminals
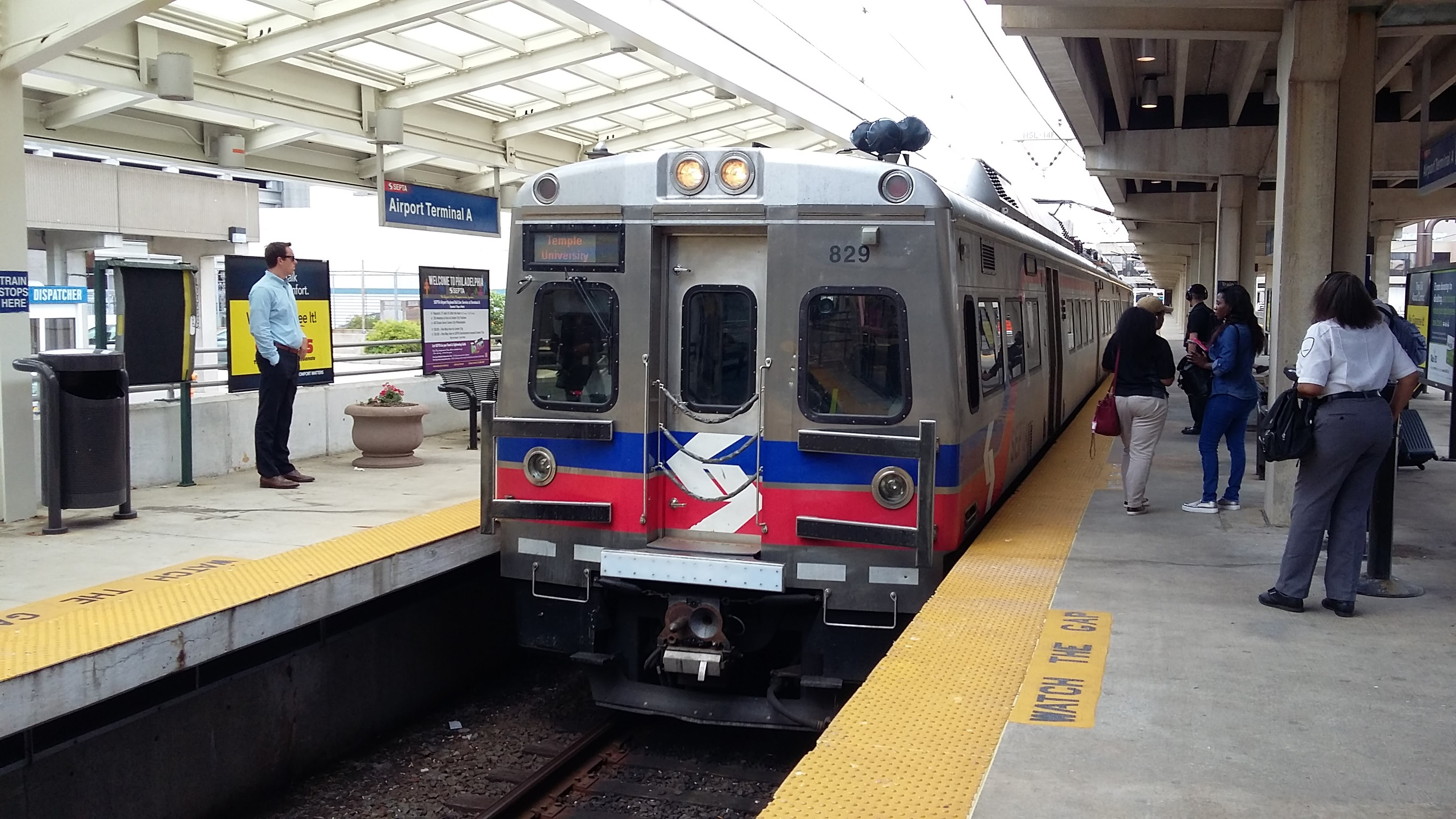
- Train at Airport Terminal A station

General information
- Other names: Airport Terminal A Airport Terminal B Airport Terminals C & D Airport Terminals E & F
- Owner: SEPTA
- Line: Airport Line
- Platforms: 2 per station 1 island platform and 1 side platform
- Tracks: 2 per station
- Connections: Philadelphia International Airport; SEPTA City Bus: 37; SEPTA Suburban Bus: 108, 115

Construction
- Parking: No
- Accessible: Yes (all stations)

Other information
- Fare zone: 4

History
- Opened: April 28, 1985

Passengers
- 2017: 400 boardings 486 alightings (Terminal A); 425 boardings 387 alightings (Terminal B); 418 boardings 387 alightings (Terminals C & D); 388 boardings 289 alightings (Terminals E & F) (weekday average)
- Rank: 67 of 146 (Terminal A); 60 of 146 (Terminal B); 62 of 146 (Terminals C & D); 69 of 146 (Terminals E & F)

Services
Preceding station	SEPTA	Following station
Terminus	Airport Line	Eastwick toward Glenside
Former services
Preceding station	Amtrak	Following station
Terminus	Atlantic City Express	Philadelphia–30th Street toward Atlantic City
Track layout
Location

The Airport Terminal stations are a group of four train stations serving Philadelphia International Airport's six terminals, serviced by SEPTA Regional Rail via the Airport Line. The stations include Airport Terminal A, Airport Terminal B, Airport Terminals C & D, and Airport Terminals E & F.

The stations for Terminal A and Terminal B share platforms on one side of the track. Trains stop at one end for Terminal A and the other end for Terminal B.

== Stations ==
=== Airport Terminal A ===
Airport Terminal A station serves Gates A1–A26.

The station entered service in 1990, five years after the rest of the line, when Terminal A opened.

=== Airport Terminal B ===
Airport Terminal B station serves Gates B1–B16.

=== Airport Terminals C & D ===
Airport Terminals C & D station serve Gates C17–C30 and D1–D16.

=== Airport Terminals E & F ===
Airport Terminals E & F station serves Gates E1–E17 and F1–F39.

2013 average weekday passenger counts
	Terminal A	Terminal B	Terminals C&D	Terminals E&F
Boardings	686	561	756	450
Alightings	617	592	431	454

Each of the four stations is fully handicapped accessible, and is located next to the baggage claim at each terminal with escalator and elevator access from each terminal's skyway. Trains from the city arrive first at Terminal A, and terminate at Terminals E and F.

Although the airport is located less than 10 miles from the city's central business district, the stations are located in zone 4.

A food court and shopping area exists between Terminals B and C. The Airport Marriott is located adjacent to Terminal B. No parking is available at any of the stations.
