= Airport Line (SEPTA) =

SEPTA Regional Rail service

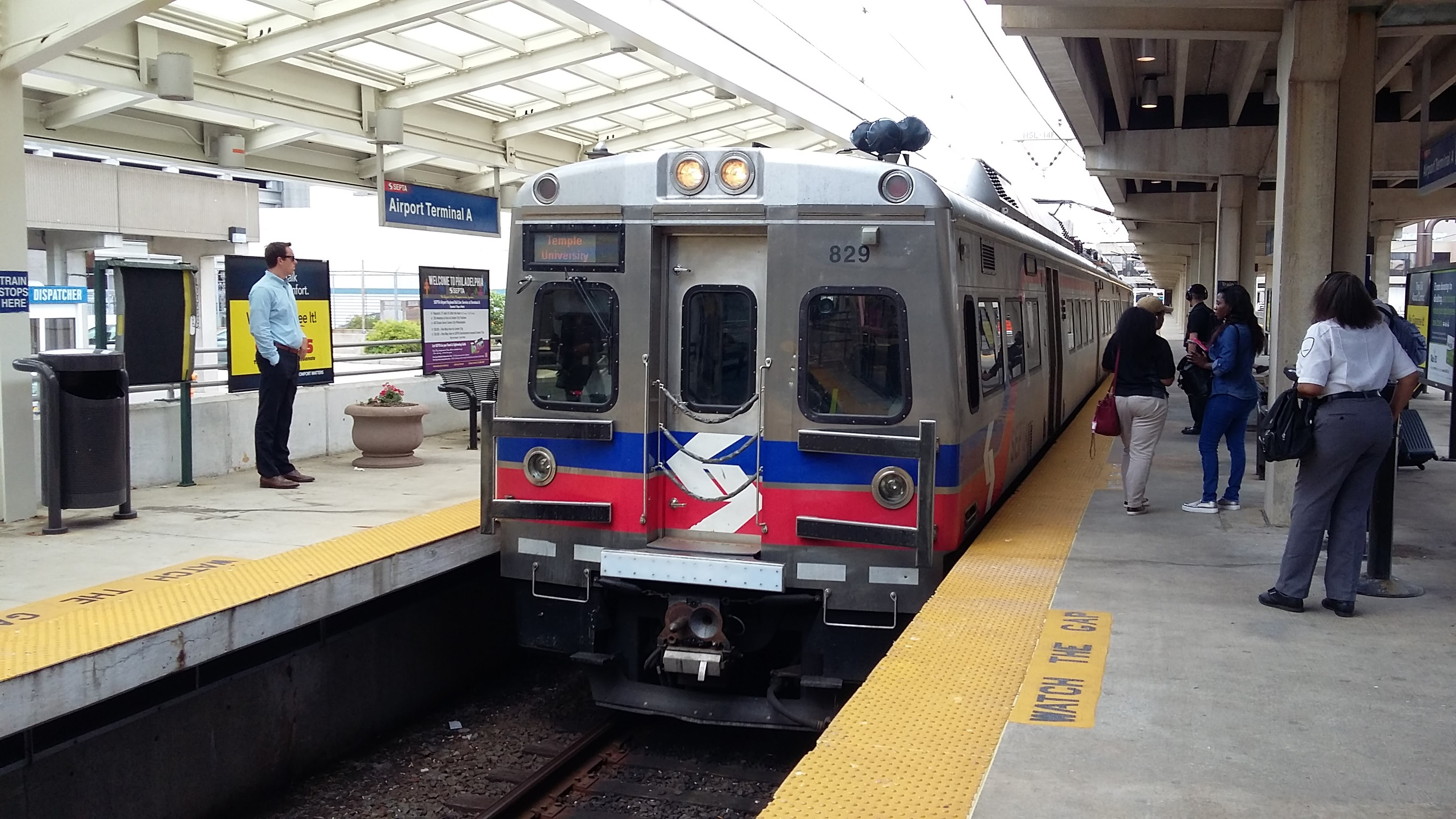
- A SEPTA train at the Airport Terminal A station bound for Center City Philadelphia

Overview
- Termini: Philadelphia International Airport Terminals; Glenside
- Stations: 16
- Website: septa.org

Service
- Type: Commuter rail
- System: SEPTA Regional Rail
- Operator: SEPTA Regional Rail
- Rolling stock: Electric Multiple Units
- Daily ridership: 7,788 (FY 2025)

History
- Opened: April 28, 1985

Technical
- Track gauge: 4 ft 8 1/2 in (1,435 mm) standard gauge
- Electrification: Overhead line, 12 kV 25 Hz AC

The Airport Line is a route of the SEPTA Regional Rail commuter rail system in Philadelphia, Pennsylvania, which officially runs between Philadelphia International Airport through Center City to Temple University station. In practice, however, only a few trains originate or terminate at Temple University; most are through routed with lines to the north after leaving the Center City Commuter Connection. Half of weekday trains are through routed with the Warminster Line, with the other half of weekday trains through routed with the Chestnut Hill East Line. Weekend and holiday trains are through routed with the Warminster and Manayunk/Norristown Line, and terminate at either Warminster or Norristown-Elm Street.

The line between Center City and the airport runs seven days a week from 5:00 am to midnight with trains every 30 minutes daily. The trip length from Suburban Station to the airport is 19 to 24 minutes. The line is fully grade-separated in the normal service, but one public grade crossing between Temple University and Glenside is present at Rices Mill Road in Glenside.

== Route ==
Geographic map of the route

While geographically on the former Pennsylvania Railroad side of the Regional Rail System, the route consists of new construction, a reconstructed industrial branch of the former Pennsylvania Railroad, and a shared Conrail (formerly Reading Company) freight branch. The Airport Line opened on April 28, 1985, as the R1 Airport Line, providing service from Center City to Philadelphia International Airport. By its twentieth anniversary in 2005, the line had carried over 20 million passengers to and from the airport. The line splits from Amtrak's Northeast Corridor north of Darby and passes over it via a flying junction. West of the airport, the line breaks from the old right-of-way and a new bridge carries it over I-95 and into the airport terminals between the baggage claim (arrivals) and the check-in counters (departures).

The line stops at four stations which are directly connected to each airport terminal by escalators and elevators which rise one level to the walkways between the arrival and departure areas. All airport stations feature high-level platforms to make it easier to board and alight from the train with luggage. Some stations can be accessed directly from the arrivals concourse by crossing Commercial Vehicles Road. The line ends between Terminals E and F at their combined station.

As of 2026, most weekday Airport Line trains are through routed with the Warminster and Chestnut Hill East Lines and alternate between terminating in Warminster and Chestnut Hill East respectively. Most weekend trains are through routed with the Warminster and Manayunk/Norristown Lines and alternate between terminating in Warminster and Norristown-Elm Street.

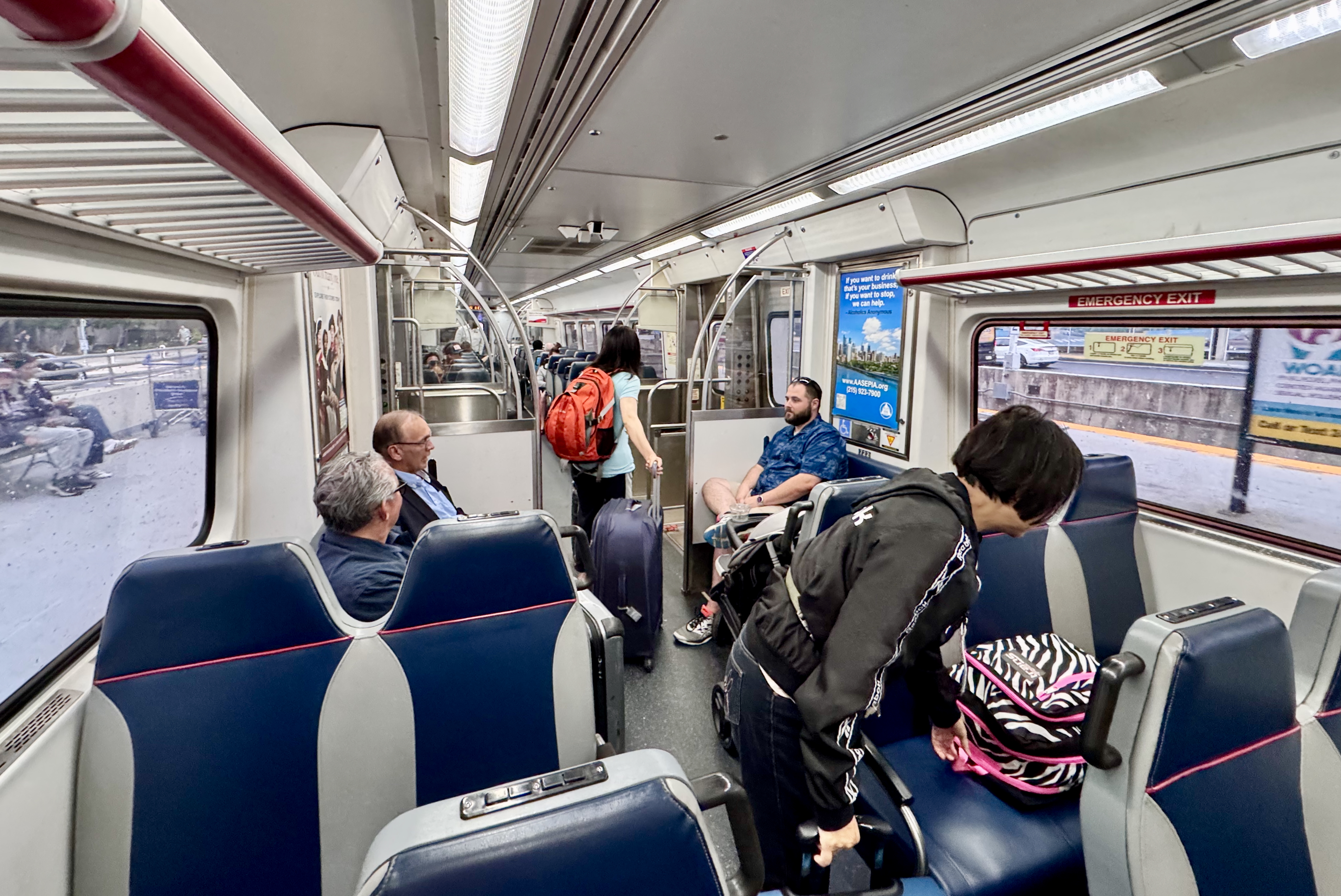
The interior of a SEPTA rail car on the Airport Line

== Stations ==
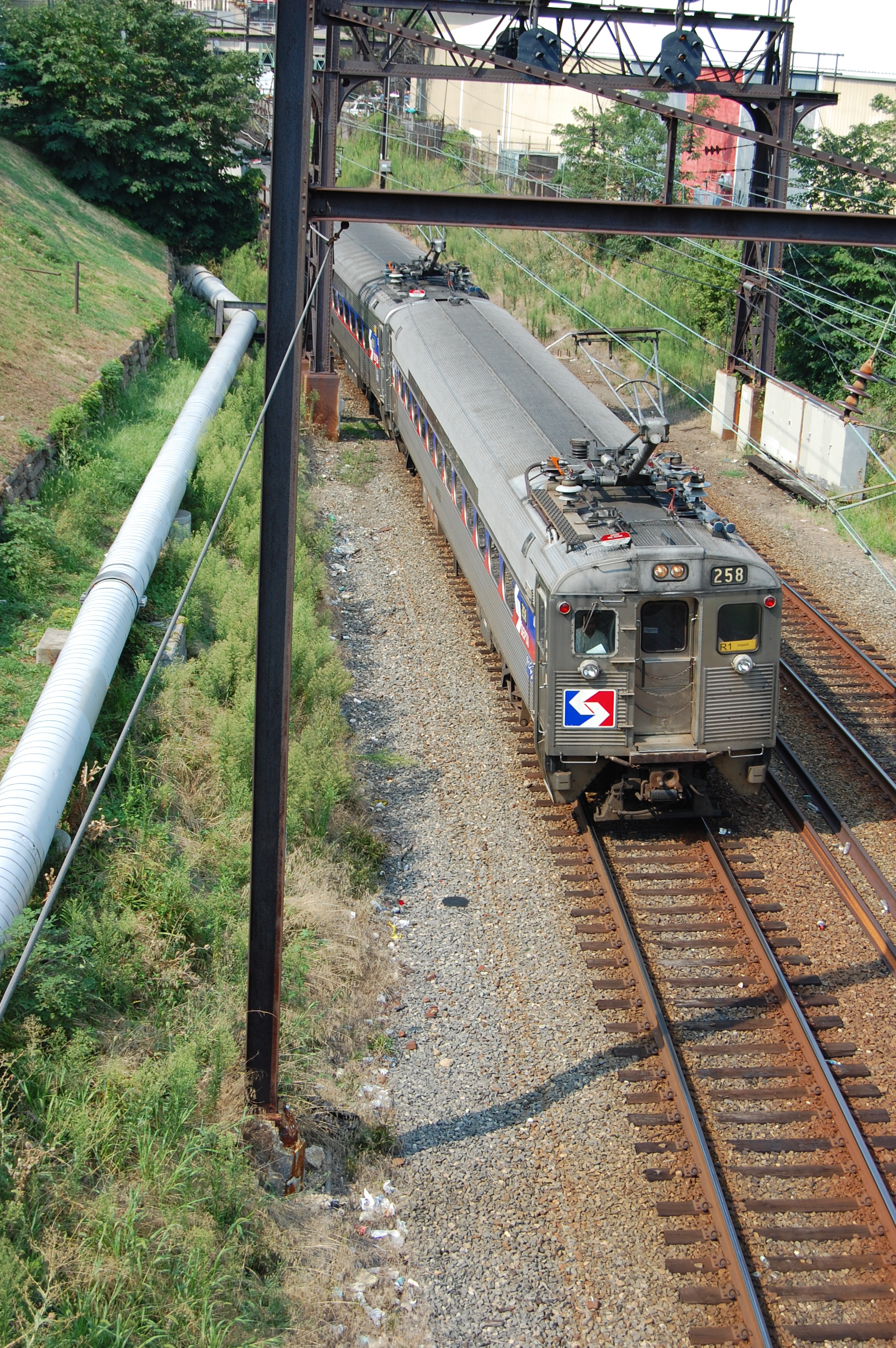
A Budd Silverliner on the Airport Line train in 2007, after departing 30th Street Station

The Airport Line makes the following station stops in Philadelphia, after leaving the Center City Commuter Connection.

Zone	Location	Station	Miles (km) from Center City	Connections / notes
C	University City	Penn Medicine Station	1.8 (2.9)	SEPTA Regional Rail: SEPTA City Bus: 40, LUCY
1	Eastwick	Eastwick	7.2 (11.6)	SEPTA City Bus: 37, 68; SEPTA Suburban Bus: 108, 115
4	Philadelphia International; Airport	Terminal A	9.1 (14.6)	SEPTA City Bus: 37; SEPTA Suburban Bus: 108, 115
4	Philadelphia International; Airport	Terminal B	9.1 (14.6)	SEPTA City Bus: 37; SEPTA Suburban Bus: 108, 115
4	Philadelphia International; Airport	Terminals C & D	9.3 (15.0)	SEPTA City Bus: 37; SEPTA Suburban Bus: 108, 115
4	Philadelphia International; Airport	Terminals E & F	9.4 (15.1)	SEPTA City Bus: 37; SEPTA Suburban Bus: 108, 115

== History ==
R1, the former designation of SEPTA's Airport Line

The line south of the Northeast Corridor was originally part of the Philadelphia, Wilmington and Baltimore Railroad main line, opened on January 17, 1838. The connection between the NEC and the original PW&B is made however by the later 60th Street Branch. A new alignment of the PW&B (now the NEC) opened November 18, 1872, and on July 1, 1873, the Philadelphia and Reading Railway, later the Reading Company, leased the old line for 999 years. Connection was made over the PRR's Junction Railroad and later the Baltimore and Ohio Railroad's Baltimore and Philadelphia Railroad. However, as a condition of the sale, no passenger service was provided. The line passed into Conrail in 1976 and SEPTA in 1983, with passenger service to the Philadelphia International Airport beginning on April 28, 1985.

Infill stations were planned from the beginning of service, two of which were on the Airport Line proper: one at 70th Street, the other one at 84th Street. The latter station was opened in 1997 as Eastwick, while 70th Street was never built, and has since disappeared from maps. Additionally, University City station (proposed as "Civic Center", now Penn Medicine Station) opened in April 1995 to serve all R1, R2 and R3 trains passing it. All these stations appeared on 1984 SEPTA informational maps, the first ones to show the Center City Commuter Connection and the Airport Line.

SEPTA activated positive train control on the Airport Line on October 10, 2016.

== Ridership ==
Between FY 2013–FY 2019 yearly ridership on the Airport Line peaked at 2,457,743 during FY 2015, but fell to 1,518,250 by FY 2019. Ridership collapsed during the COVID-19 pandemic, but improved to 2,270,443 by FY 2025. (Note: Data for individual lines is not available for FY 2020.)
