= SEPTA Main Line =

Railway line in Pennsylvania

Glenside Combined
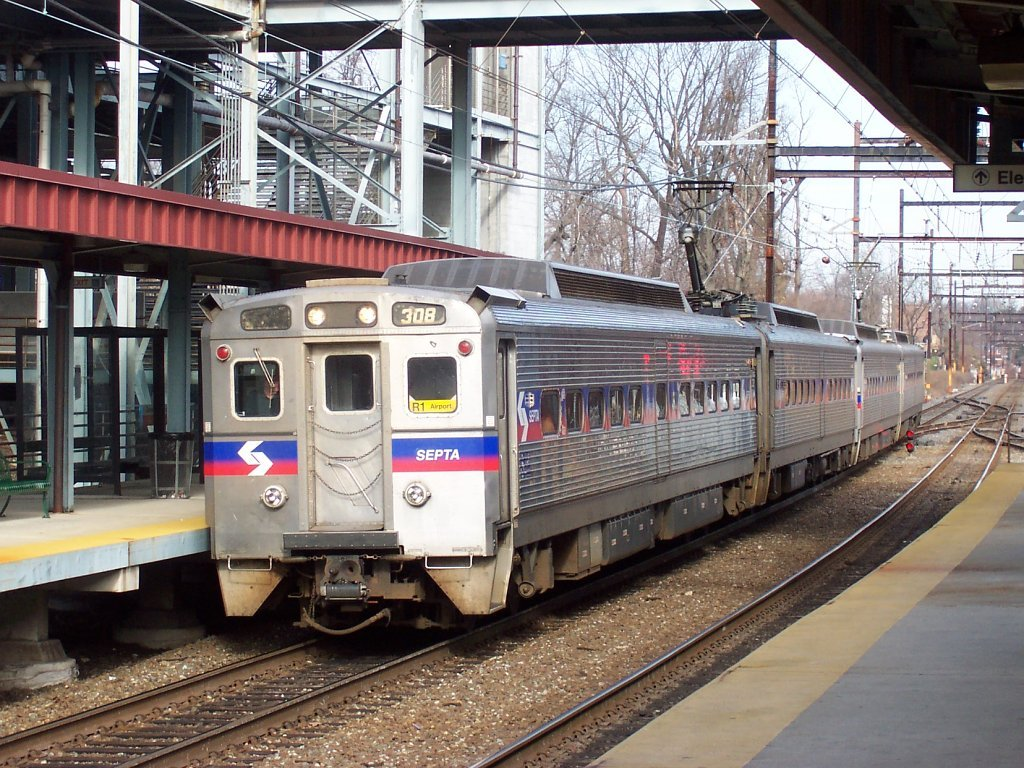
- A train operating on the SEPTA Main Line arrives at Fern Rock Transportation Center

Overview
- Status: Operating
- Owner: SEPTA
- Termini: Zoo Interlocking; Lansdale Station
- Stations: 20
- Website: septa.org

Service
- Type: Commuter rail line
- System: SEPTA Regional Rail
- Operator(s): SEPTA Regional Rail

Technical
- Line length: 26.25 miles (42.25 km)
- Number of tracks: 2–4
- Track gauge: 4 ft 8 1/2 in (1,435 mm) standard gauge
- Electrification: Overhead line, 12 kV 25 Hz AC

The SEPTA Main Line is the section of the SEPTA Regional Rail system from the Zoo Interlocking in West Philadelphia to Lansdale Station in Lansdale, Pennsylvania. The line is 26.25 miles (42.25 km) long, and serves all 13 SEPTA Regional Rail lines.

== Service ==
Service on the Main Line segment between Glenside and Center City Philadelphia is given a special combined public timetable known as the Glenside Combined, allowing riders to see the schedules of all trains on the Main Line without having to look at multiple schedules. This is a partial legacy of SEPTA's former diametrical reorganization route number designations, which had the R1 Glenside designation for trains that terminated at the station, paired with the Airport Line. A contributing factor to the elimination of the R-number naming system came in the fact that few trains actually terminated there, instead continuing on to stations farther out.

As of 2024, northbound trains on the Main Line that do not terminate at Glenside continue as Lansdale/Doylestown Line, Warminster Line, or West Trenton Line trains.

== History ==
The Main Line was mostly built by the North Pennsylvania Railroad. However, the oldest section was part of the Philadelphia, Germantown and Norristown Railroad (PG&N), the first railroad in Philadelphia. The first section of it opened on June 7, 1832, from downtown to Germantown (now on the Chestnut Hill East Line). Later a new alignment was built to Norristown, leaving the old route from North Philadelphia to Germantown as a branch; this is now the Manayunk/Norristown Line. The PG&N south of Wayne Junction, the Ninth Street Branch, is now part of the Main Line.

The North Pennsylvania Railroad (North Penn) opened south of Gwynedd (north of Glenside) on July 2, 1855, and the continuation to Lansdale (including the branch to Doylestown, now the Lansdale/Doylestown Line) opened October 7. The short part of the Main Line from Wayne Junction northeast to north of Newtown Junction was built as a connection to the PG&N at Wayne Junction.

On December 1, 1870, the Philadelphia and Reading Railway (later the Reading Company) leased the PG&N. The North Penn was leased May 1, 1879, placing the future "Reading side" of the SEPTA Main Line under Reading control. Electrification to Glenside, Hatboro, Lansdale, Doylestown and West Trenton was completed on July 26, 1931. In 1976 Conrail took over the Reading, and in 1983 SEPTA gained control of the commuter operations. The Center City Commuter Connection was tied into the former Reading Ninth Street Branch on November 12, 1984, completing the SEPTA Main Line as it is defined today.

SEPTA activated positive train control on the Main Line from Glenside to Fern Rock on December 12, 2016 and from Fern Rock to 30th Street on January 9, 2017.

== Other uses ==
The term "Main Line" is also sometimes used on the SEPTA Regional Rail system to refer to the Paoli/Thorndale Line, which runs along the original main line of the Pennsylvania Railroad, which is now Amtrak's Philadelphia to Harrisburg Main Line.
