= Penn Medicine Station =

Railway station in Philadelphia, Pennsylvania

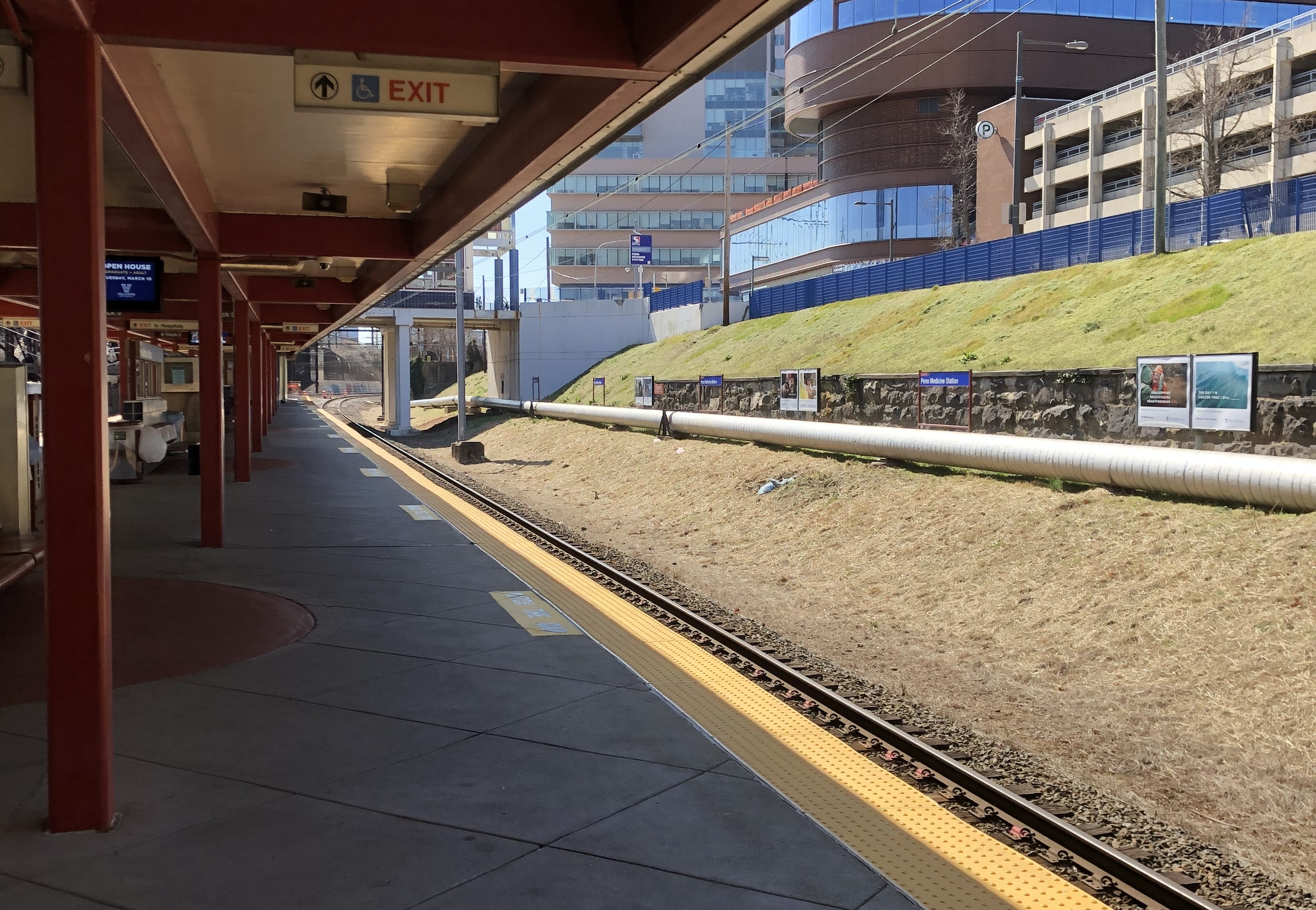
- Penn Medicine Station platform

General information
- Location: 3149 Convention Boulevard; Philadelphia, Pennsylvania, U.S.
- Coordinates: 39°56′52″N 75°11′25″W
- Owner: SEPTA
- Line: West Chester Branch
- Platforms: 1 island platform
- Tracks: 2
- Connections: SEPTA City Bus: 30, 40, 42, 49, LUCY

Construction
- Cycle facilities: 10 rack spaces
- Accessible: Yes

Other information
- Fare zone: CC

History
- Opened: 1995
- Former names: University City; Penn Medicine–University City

Passengers
- 2017: 2,605 boardings, 2,518 alightings (weekday average)
- Rank: 5 of 146

Services
Preceding station	SEPTA	Following station
Eastwick toward Airport	Airport Line	30th Street Station toward Glenside
Terminus	Chestnut Hill East Line (weekends and major holidays)	30th Street Station toward Chestnut Hill East
Terminus	Fox Chase Line	30th Street Station toward Fox Chase
Terminus	Lansdale/Doylestown Line	30th Street Station toward Doylestown
Terminus	Manayunk/Norristown Line	30th Street Station toward Norristown–Elm Street
Terminus	Warminster Line	30th Street Station toward Warminster
Terminus	West Trenton Line	30th Street Station toward West Trenton
49th Street toward Wawa Station	Media/Wawa Line	30th Street Station toward Temple University
Darby toward Newark	Wilmington/Newark Line	30th Street Station toward Temple University
Track layout
Location

Penn Medicine Station (formerly University City station) is a train station in the University City section of Philadelphia, Pennsylvania on the SEPTA Regional Rail system. The station serves the area around the University of Pennsylvania, and is located at South Street and Convention Avenue. Located on the West Chester Branch, it serves the Airport, Fox Chase, Lansdale/Doylestown, Manayunk/Norristown, Media/Wawa, Wilmington/Newark, Warminster, and West Trenton Regional Rail services. In 2013, this station saw 3,091 boardings and 2,950 alightings on an average weekday.

The station is less than a block from the University of Pennsylvania's Franklin Field and the Palestra. It is one block away from the medical campuses of the Hospital of the University of Pennsylvania and the Children's Hospital of Philadelphia. The rest of the University of Pennsylvania campus, Drexel University campus, and the Graduate Hospital campus and the neighborhood across the Schuylkill River are also nearby and easily accessible.

== History ==
University City station was conceived in 1979 by the City of Philadelphia as Civic Center, under which name it appeared as "proposed" on SEPTA informational maps of the 1980s. The name had been abandoned by the time construction began in 1991. The station instead opened with the regionally descriptive name of University City on April 24, 1995.

The station has a blue and red color scheme, a nod to Penn's colors.

On January 27, 2020, SEPTA announced that the station would be renamed Penn Medicine Station after selling naming rights to Penn Medicine for $3.3 million in a 5-year deal.

== Routes served ==
Since its inception, the station has been a stop for all trains on the five SEPTA rail lines which pass through the station, including rush-hour express trains on the Wilmington/Newark and Media/Wawa lines; thus it has a high level of service at all times. Even though not all lines serve it, Penn Medicine is listed in timetables and other SEPTA literature as one of the five Center City Philadelphia (CCP) stations, and falls within the CCP Regional Rail fare zone.

The station is also served by SEPTA bus route 40 which runs along South Street, and bus routes 30, 42, 49, and the LUCY Green Loop from the nearby corner of Convention Avenue and Health Sciences Drive.

== Station layout ==
Penn Medicine Station has one high-level island platform serving both tracks.
