= Willow Grove station =

Railway station in Willow Grove, Pennsylvania

Willow Grove
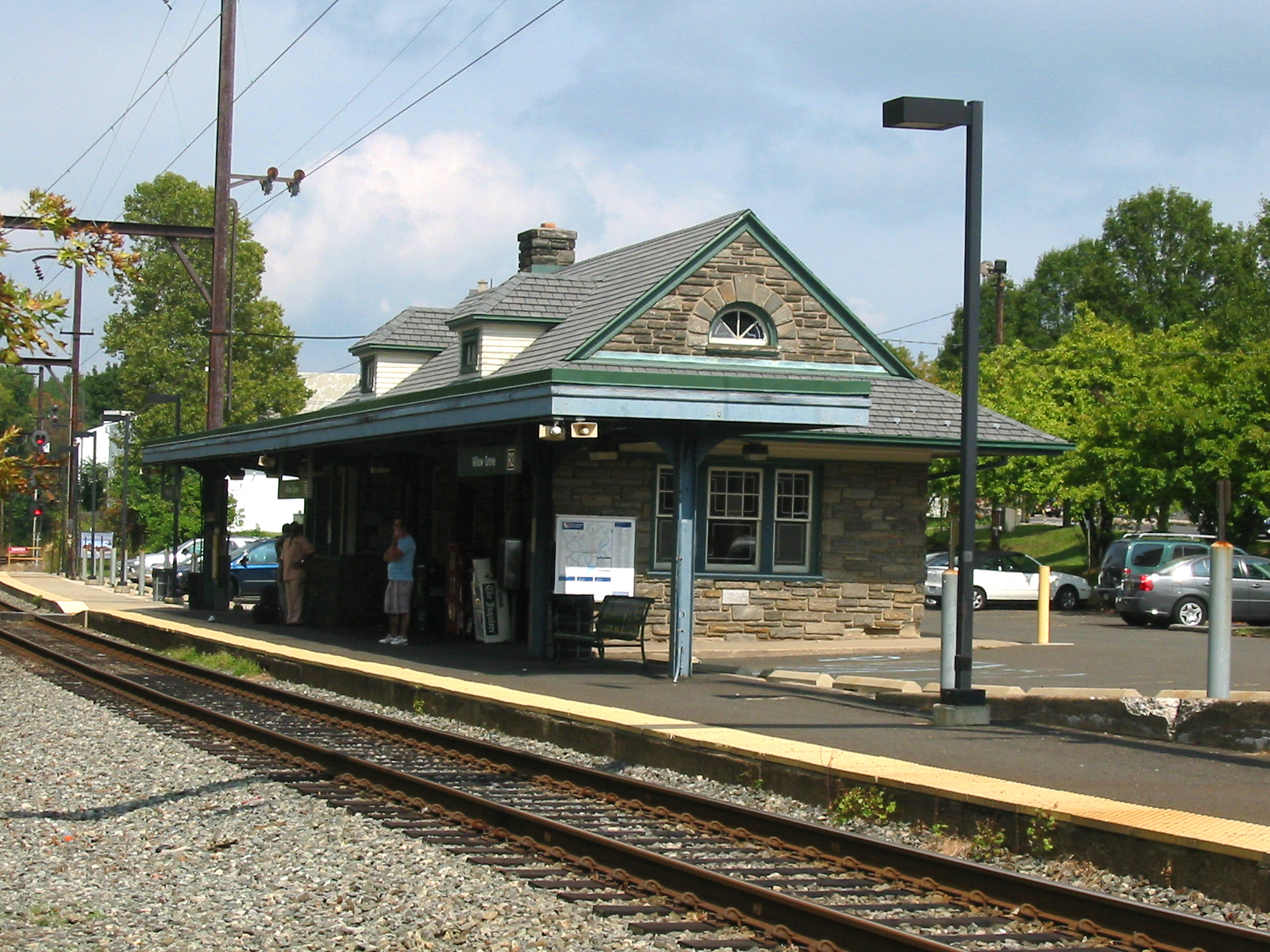
- Willow Grove station viewed from the southwest

General information
- Location: York Road and Davisville Road; Willow Grove, Pennsylvania, U.S.
- Coordinates: 40.1436°N 75.1143°W
- Owner: SEPTA
- Line: Warminster Branch
- Platforms: 1 side platform
- Tracks: 1
- Connections: SEPTA City Bus: 22, 55

Construction
- Parking: 190 spaces
- Cycle facilities: Two racks
- Accessible: No

Other information
- Station code: WLG
- Fare zone: 3

History
- Opened: 1886
- Rebuilt: 1939
- Electrified: July 26, 1931

Passengers
- 2017: 388 boardings 349 alightings (weekday average)
- Rank: 68 of 146

Services
Preceding station	SEPTA	Following station
Crestmont toward Penn Medicine Station	Warminster Line	Hatboro toward Warminster
Crestmont toward Penn Medicine Station	Warminster Line	Fulmor Closed 1996 toward Warminster
Former services
Preceding station	Reading Railroad	Following station
Crestmont toward Philadelphia	New Hope Branch	Fulmor toward New Hope
Location

Willow Grove station is a SEPTA station on the Warminster Line, located in Willow Grove, Pennsylvania. The station, located on York Road (PA 611) and Davisville Roads, features a 190-space parking lot. Willow Grove station was originally built in 1886 by the Reading Railroad, and replaced by a stone structure built in 1939. The station house was closed in 1965, but continues to serve passengers.

== Description ==
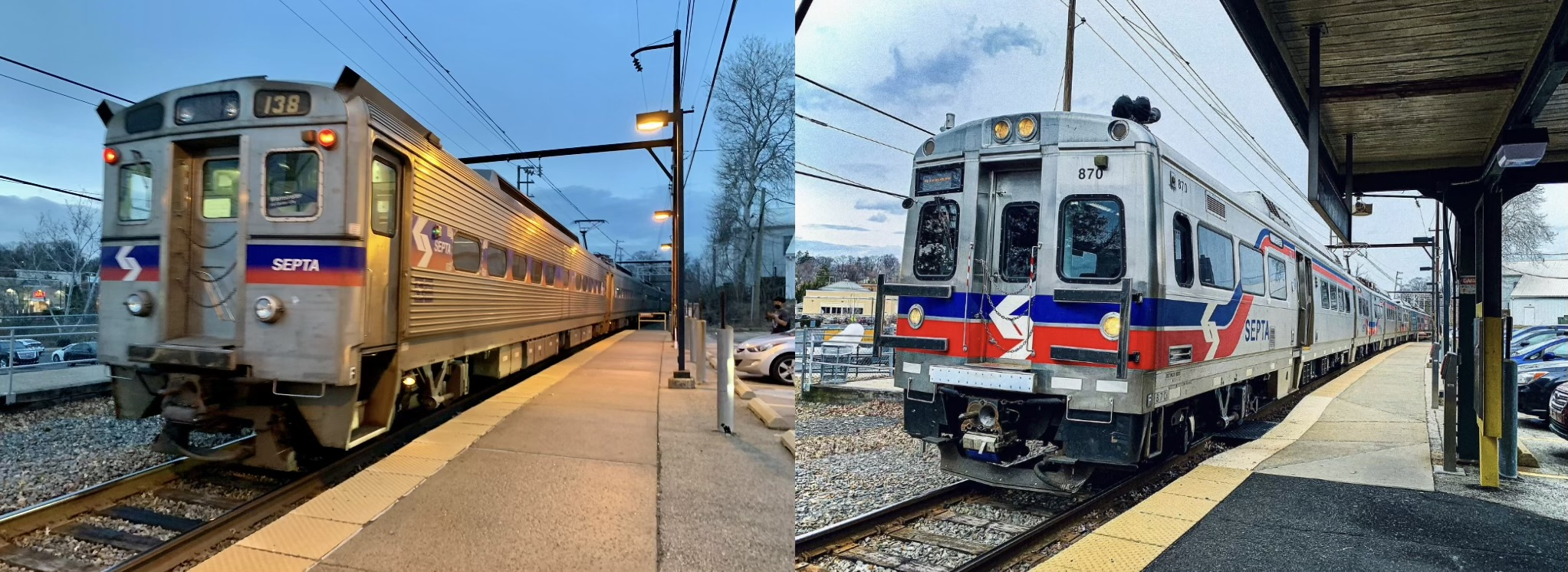
A Silverliner-IV and Silverliner-V arrive at the single side platform of Willow Grove station.

Willow Grove station consists of a side platform along the tracks. The station has a ticket office and waiting room that is open on weekday mornings. There are two bike racks available that can hold up to four bicycles. Willow Grove station has a daily parking lot with 116 spaces that charges $1 a day, a permit parking lot with 32 spaces that charges $20 a month, and a daily parking lot with 42 spaces that charges 50 cents a day.

Train service at Willow Grove station is provided along the Warminster Line of SEPTA Regional Rail, which runs south to Center City Philadelphia and north to its terminus at Warminster. Willow Grove station is located in fare zone 3. Service is provided daily from early morning to late evening. Most Warminster Line trains continue through the Center City Commuter Connection tunnel and become Airport Line trains, providing service to the Philadelphia International Airport. In FY 2013, Willow Grove station had a weekday average of 472 boardings and 515 alightings.

== Amenities ==
The Willow Grove station has a heated waiting area with restrooms which is only open on weekdays from 5:15 AM to 11:15 AM to registered Septa Keycard holders. The ticket window was shut down in May of 2025. Several benches for sitting on while people wait for the train to come are also available, all of them under a canopy-type roof so that people do not get wet on rainy days.

== Schedules ==
Trains going to Center City Philadelphia arrive at the Willow Grove station about every hour on weekdays (with more frequent service during the morning rush hour) and every two hours on weekends and major holidays, and trains headed towards Warminster station arrive every hour on weekdays (with more frequent service during the evening rush hour) and every two hours on weekends and major holidays.

== Fares ==
On weekdays between 5:15 am and 11:45 am, commuters can buy and/or reload a SEPTA Key Card to ride the train inside the station's ticket office, but on weekends and weekday afternoons, tickets must be purchased from the train conductor or Key Card Fares must be loaded on the SEPTA Key Website or at an Exit Fare Kiosk in Center City upon departure of Willow Grove station. Passengers buying their ticket on board the train may pay for their ticket with cash or credit card . SEPTA Key Card fares purchased in advance also cost less than tickets purchased from the conductor on board the train.

== Gallery ==
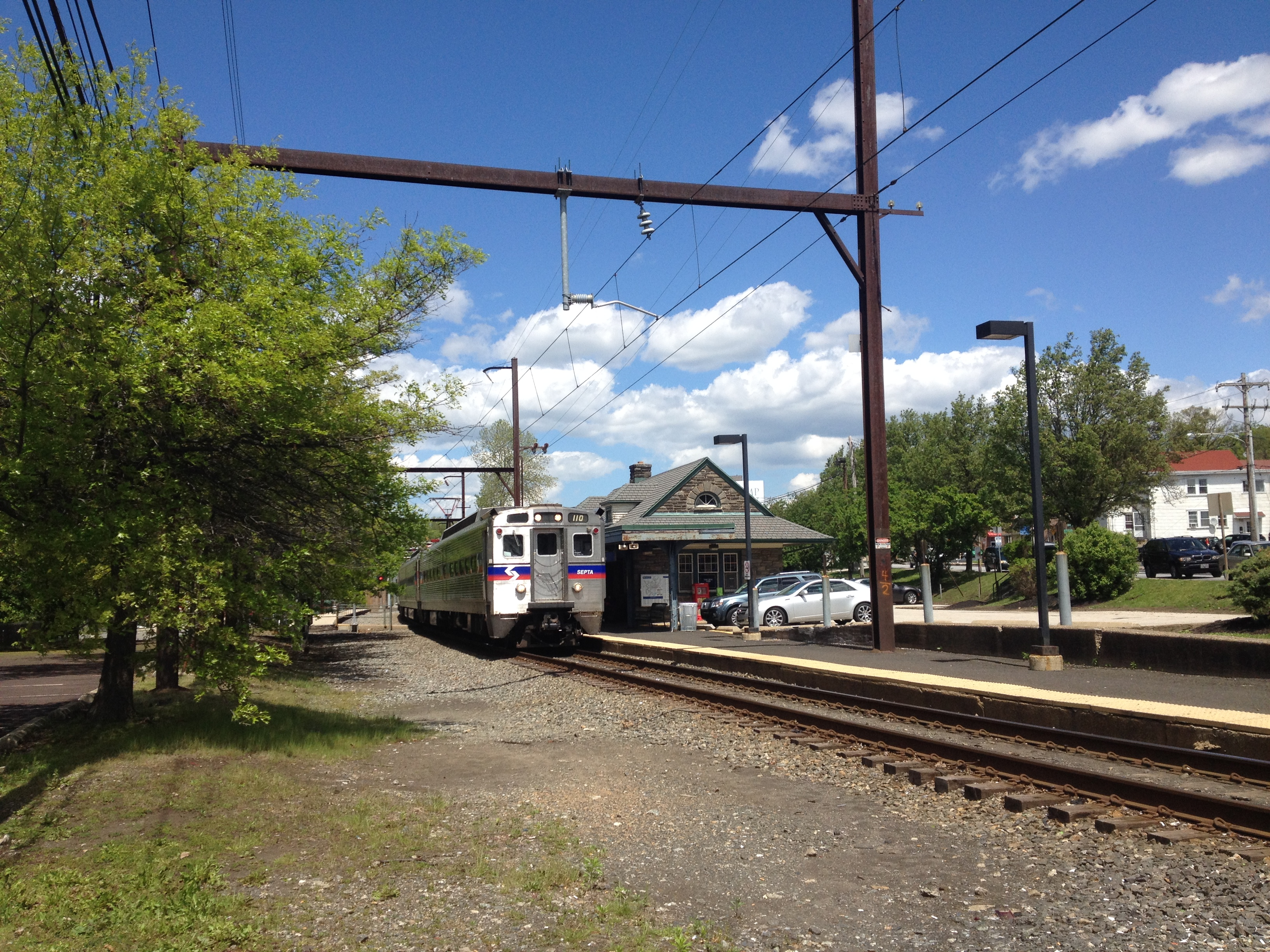
A Center City-bound train stops at Willow Grove in May 2016

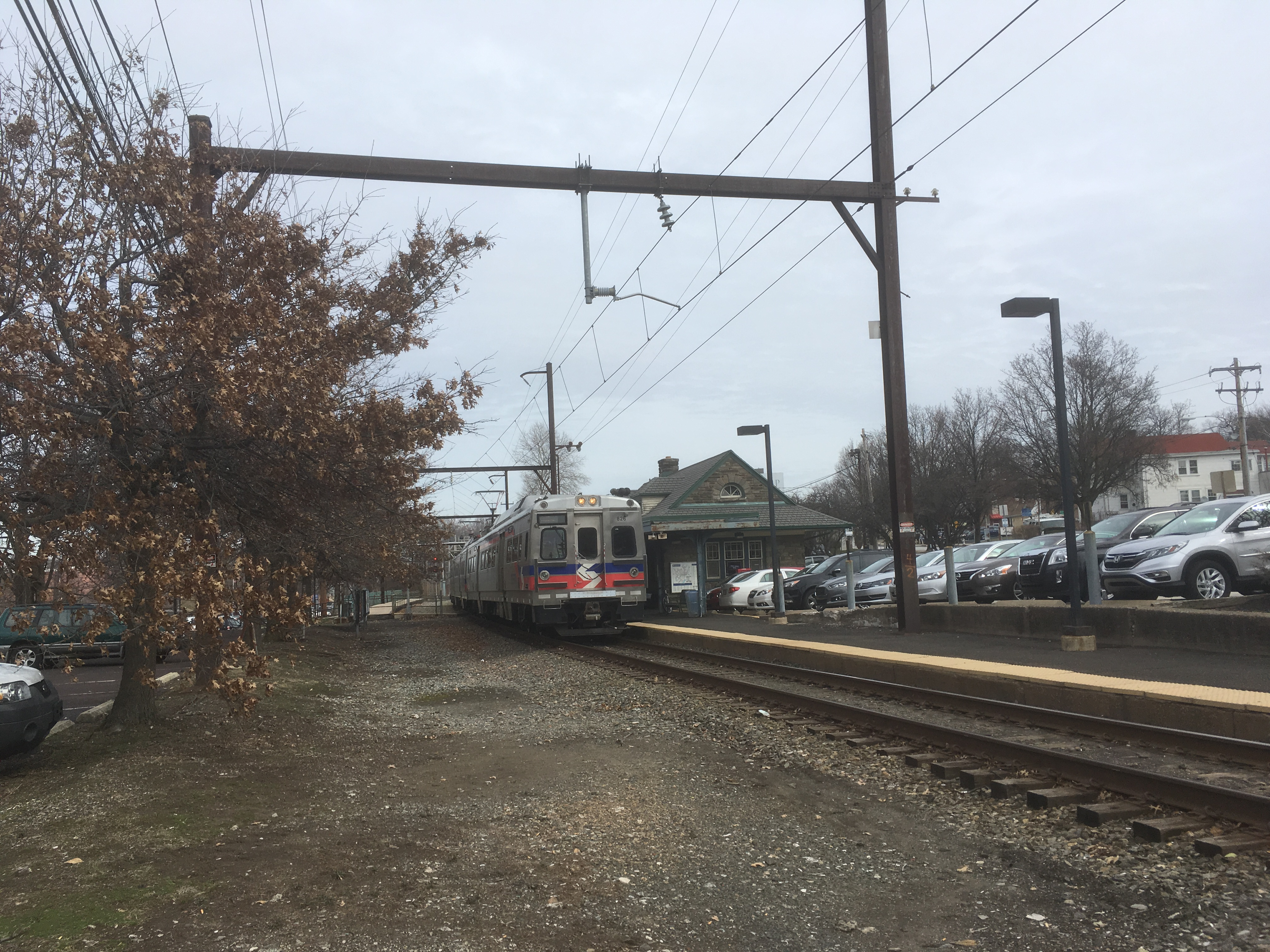
A Center City-bound train stops at Willow Grove in February 2017

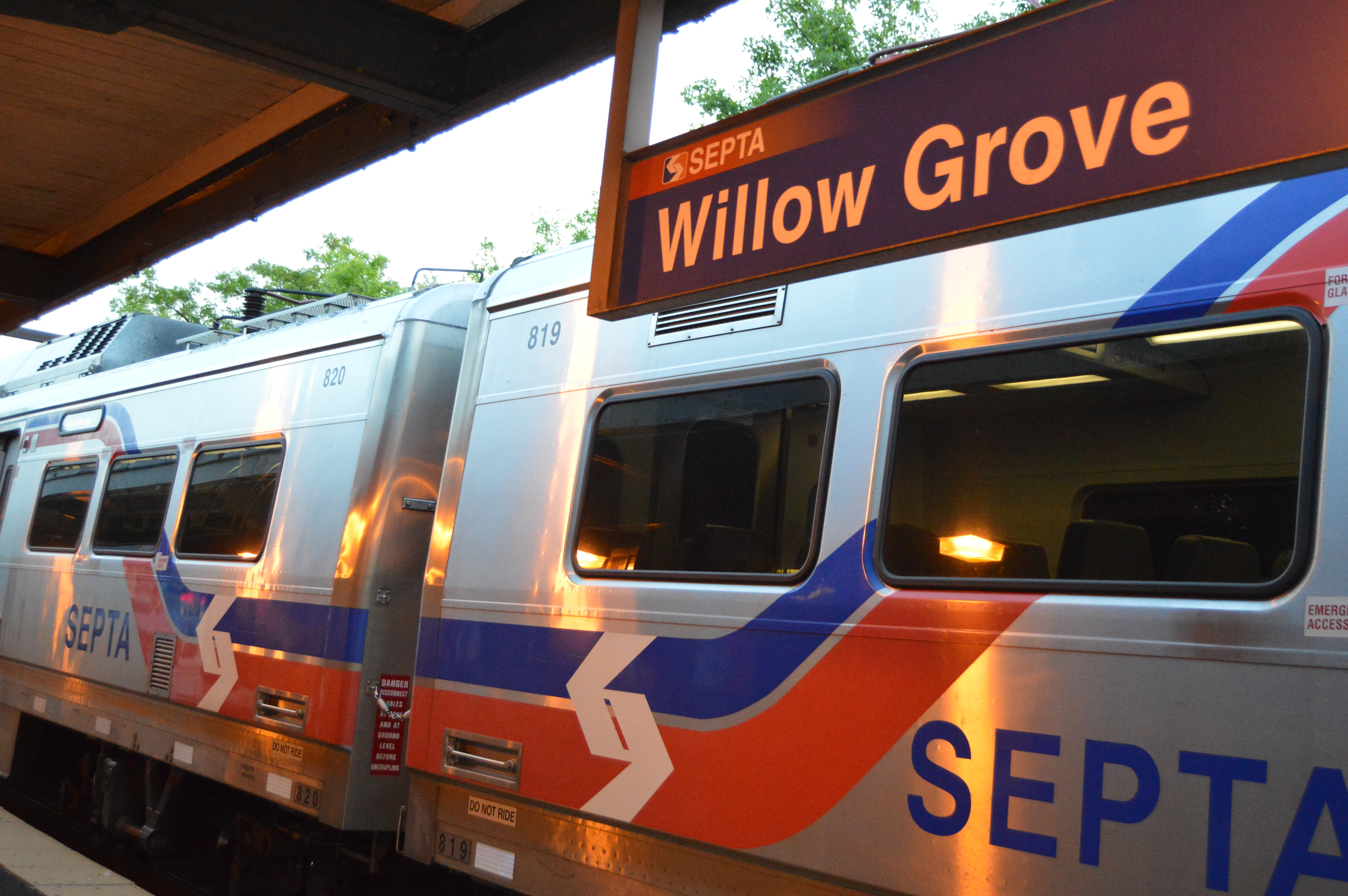
SEPTA train at Willow Grove
