= Roslyn station (SEPTA) =

Railway station in Abington, Pennsylvania

Roslyn
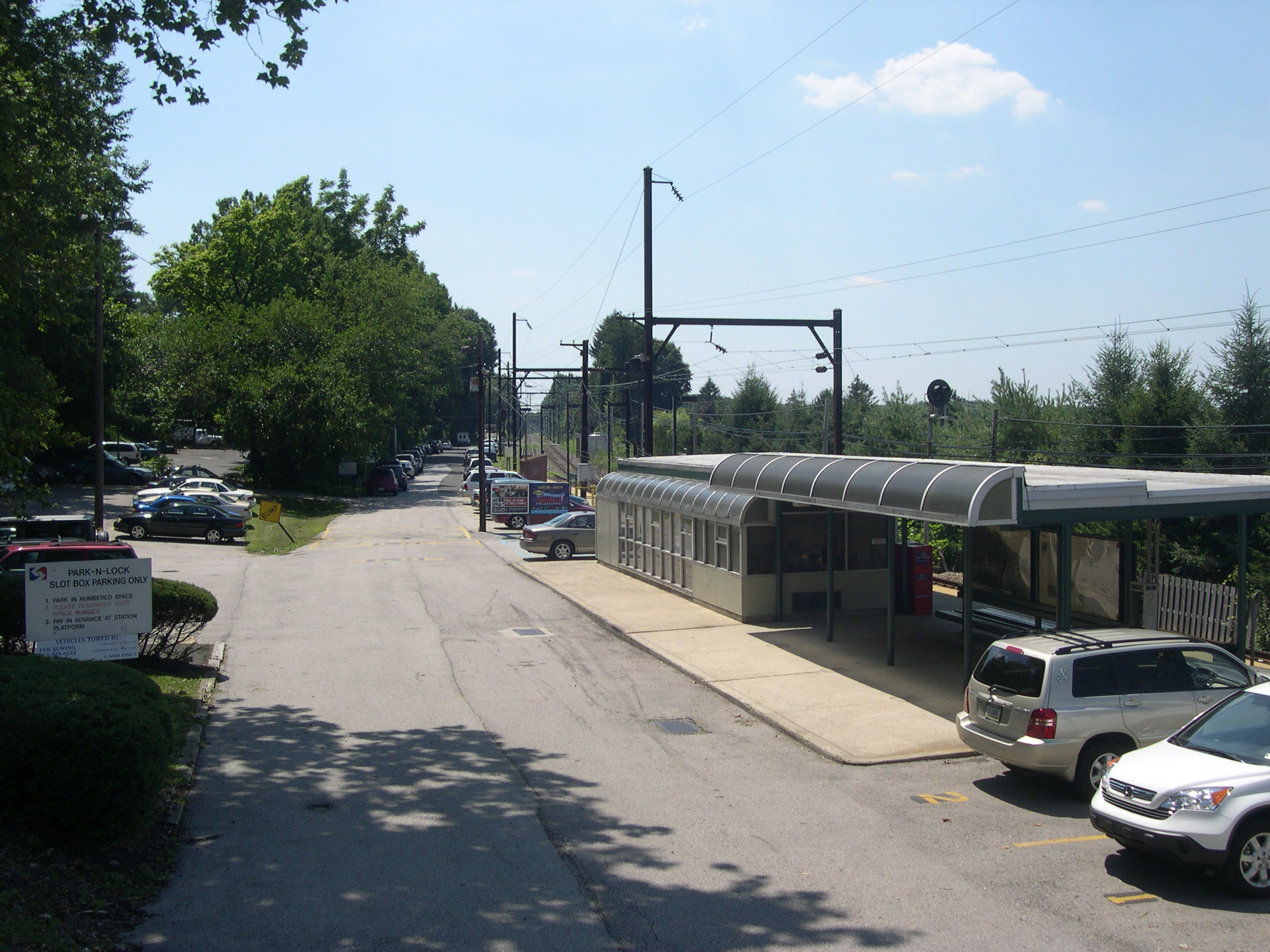

General information
- Location: 1096 South Easton Road & Susquehanna Road; Abington, Pennsylvania 19001
- Coordinates: 40°07′14.5″N 75°08′04″W
- Owner: SEPTA
- Line: Warminster Branch
- Platforms: 1 side platform
- Tracks: 1
- Connections: SEPTA City Bus: 22

Construction
- Accessible: yes

Other information
- Station code: 90805
- Fare zone: 3

History
- Electrified: July 26, 1931; 95 years ago

Passengers
- 2017: 285 boardings 238 alightings (weekday average)
- Rank: 93 of 146

Services
Preceding station	SEPTA	Following station
Ardsley toward Penn Medicine Station	Warminster Line	Crestmont toward Warminster
Former services
Preceding station	Reading Railroad	Following station
Ardsley toward Philadelphia	New Hope Branch	Crestmont toward New Hope
Location

Roslyn station is a SEPTA Regional Rail station in Roslyn, Pennsylvania. Located at the intersection of Easton and Susquehanna Roads, it serves the Warminster Line.

The original station was built by the Reading Railroad. The building was demolished in 1980 in favor of a modern facility. The station has a parking lot with 61 spaces. In FY 2017, Roslyn station had a weekday average of 285 boardings and 238 alightings. Prior to 2010, Roslyn station was where the Warminster Line ended double-track operation. Since then, the interlocking has been moved roughly 1/2 mile farther back. This station is wheelchair ADA accessible.
