= Ardsley =

Ardsley may refer to:

- Ardsley, New York, United States
- Ardsley, Pennsylvania, United States
  - Ardsley (SEPTA station), a commuter rail station in Ardsley, Pennsylvania
- Ardsley, South Yorkshire, England
- East Ardsley, West Yorkshire, England
  - Ardsley railway station, a former station at East Ardsley
- West Ardsley, West Yorkshire, England
- Ardsley (automobile)
