= Crestmont station =

Railway station in Abington, Pennsylvania

Crestmont
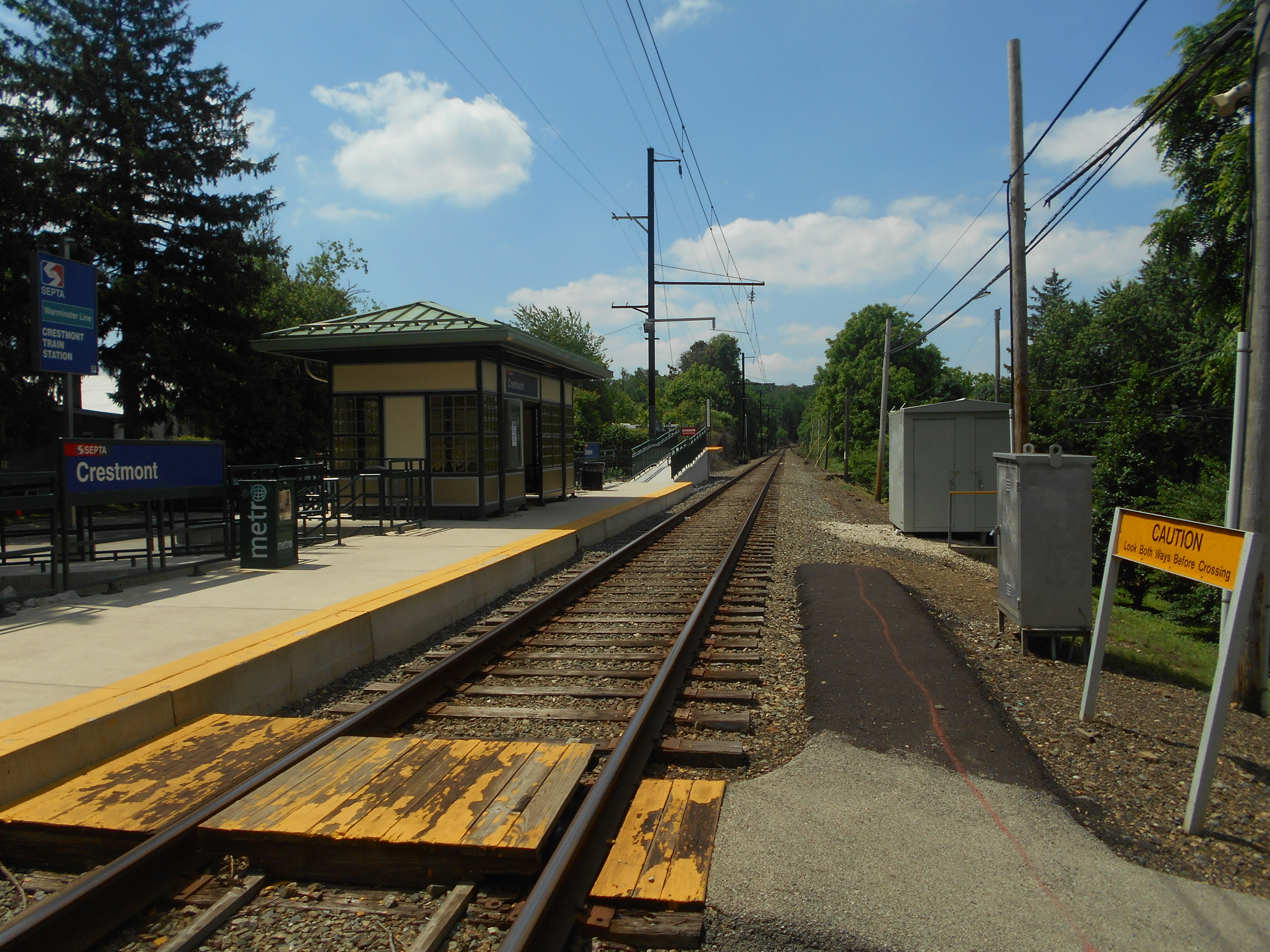
- Crestmont station in June 2014, after the platform had been reconstructed.

General information
- Location: Rubicam Avenue & Rockwell Road; Abington, Pennsylvania
- Coordinates: 40°08′00″N 75°07′07″W
- Owner: SEPTA
- Line: Warminster Branch
- Platforms: 1 side platform
- Tracks: 1
- Connections: SEPTA City Bus: 22

Construction
- Platform levels: 1
- Parking: Limited
- Accessible: yes

Other information
- Fare zone: 3

History
- Rebuilt: 2009
- Electrified: July 26, 1931

Services
Preceding station	SEPTA	Following station
Roslyn toward Penn Medicine Station	Warminster Line	Willow Grove toward Warminster
Former services
Preceding station	Reading Railroad	Following station
Roslyn toward Philadelphia	New Hope Branch	Willow Grove toward New Hope
Location

Crestmont station is a railroad station in the Crestmont section of Abington Township, Montgomery County, Pennsylvania on SEPTA's Warminster Line, formerly the Reading New Hope branch. It is located at the intersection of Rubicam Avenue and Rockwell Road. The station parking lot has 24 spaces. The station contains no ticket or station facilities and consists only of a shelter. SEPTA rebuilt the platform and waiting shelter in 2009. In FY 2013, Crestmont station had a weekday average of 89 boardings and 91 alightings. This station is wheelchair ADA accessible.
