= Fulmor station =

Railroad station in Pennsylvania

Fulmor
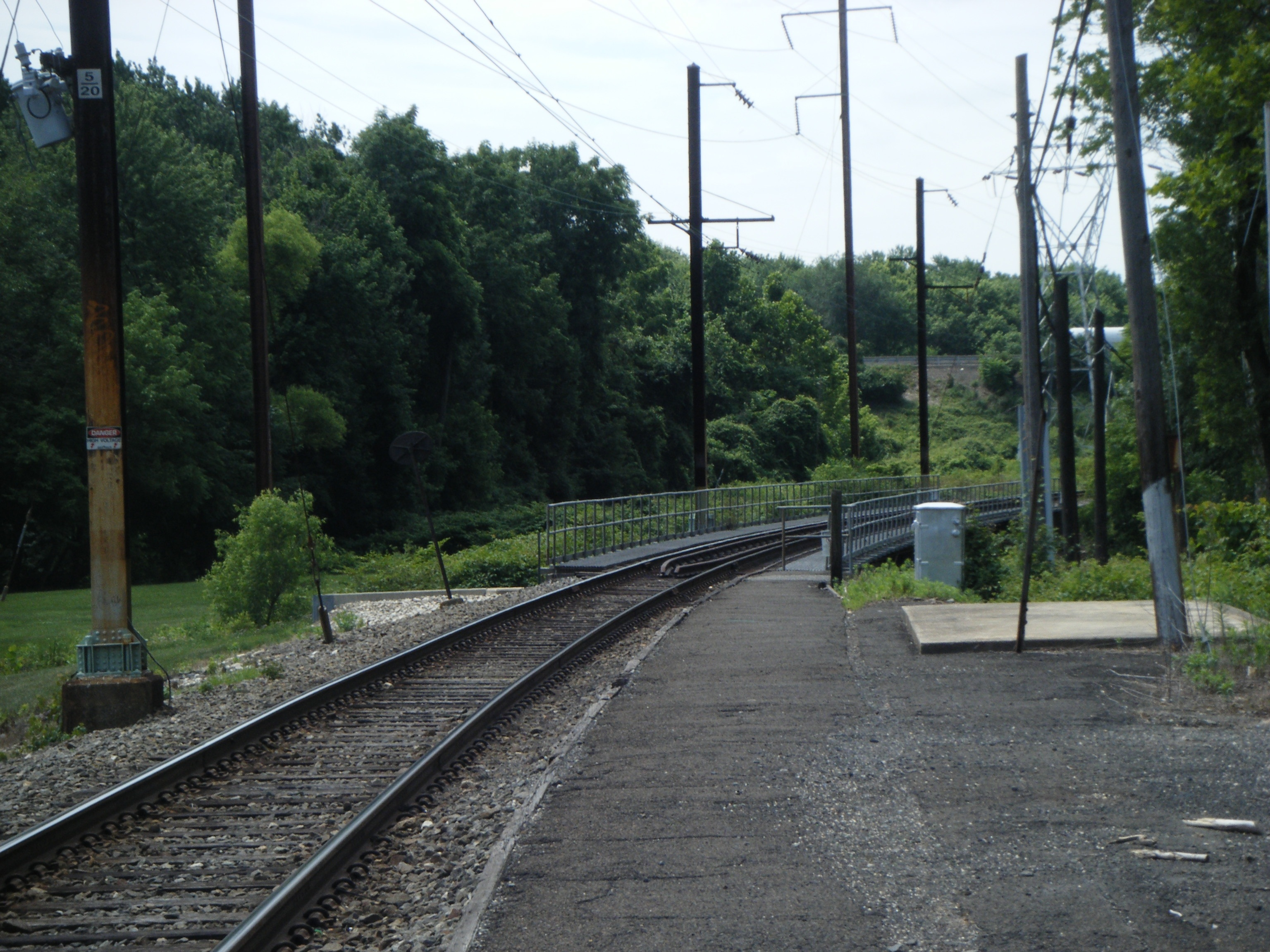
- Fulmor station site in June 2011

General information
- Location: Warminster Road and Mill Road; Upper Moreland Township, Pennsylvania
- Coordinates: 40.16581°N 75.10488°W
- Line: Warminster Branch
- Platforms: 1 side platform
- Tracks: 1

Construction
- Accessible: No

History
- Closed: November 10, 1996
- Electrified: July 26, 1931

Former services
Preceding station	SEPTA	Following station
Willow Grove toward Penn Medicine Station	Warminster Line	Hatboro toward Warminster
Preceding station	Reading Railroad	Following station
Willow Grove toward Philadelphia	New Hope Branch	Hatboro toward New Hope
Location

Fulmor station is a derelict railroad station in Upper Moreland Township, Pennsylvania, located near the intersection of Warminster Road and Mill Road. The station was originally built by the North East Pennsylvania Railroad. It was later taken over by SEPTA Regional Rail for the R2 Warminster Line, and the original building was replaced by a fiberglass shelter. SEPTA closed the station in 1996 as part of several service cuts; at the time it saw only 15 riders per day.
