= Ardsley station =

Railway station in Pennsylvania

Ardsley
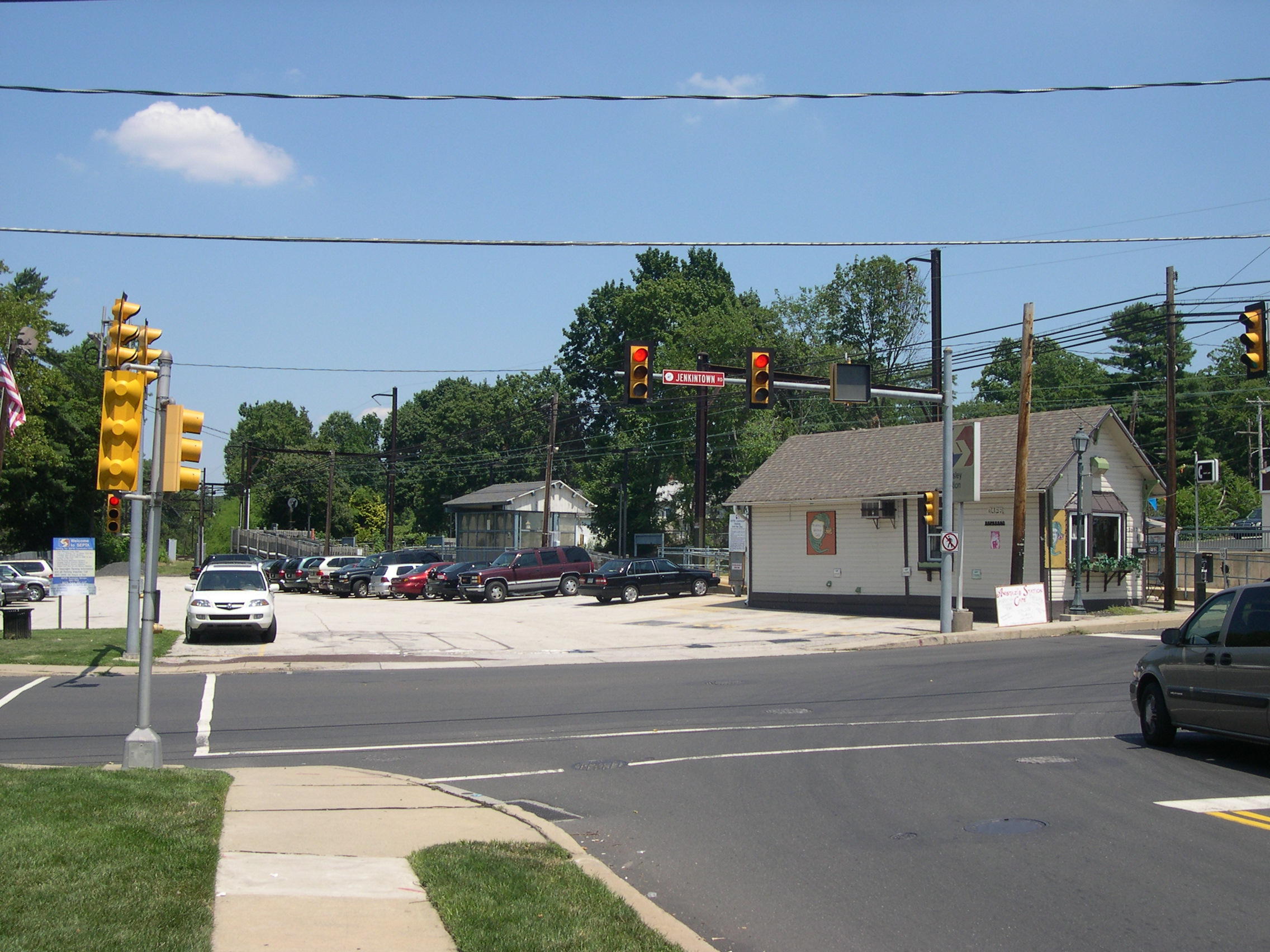
- Ardsley station in Ardsley, Pennsylvania

General information
- Location: 2611 Jenkintown and Edge Hill Roads; Glenside, Pennsylvania, 19038
- Coordinates: 40°06′50.5″N 75°09′11.5″W
- Owner: SEPTA
- Line: Warminster Branch
- Platforms: 2 side platforms
- Tracks: 2

Construction
- Accessible: yes

Other information
- Station code: ARD
- Fare zone: 3

History
- Electrified: July 26, 1931

Services
Preceding station	SEPTA	Following station
Glenside toward Penn Medicine Station	Warminster Line	Roslyn toward Warminster
Former services
Preceding station	Reading Railroad	Following station
Glenside toward Philadelphia	New Hope Branch	Roslyn toward New Hope
Location

Ardsley station is a SEPTA Regional Rail station in Ardsley, Pennsylvania. It serves the Warminster Line and is located at the intersection of Jenkintown Road and Edge Hill Road. In FY 2013, Ardsley station had a weekday average of 175 boardings and 175 alightings.

Ardsley station is the last stop inbound before Glenside station in Glenside, Pennsylvania, where it merges with the SEPTA Main Line which runs between Philadelphia and Lansdale. This station is wheelchair/ADA accessible, and has parking for 45 vehicles..

== Station layout ==
Ardsley has two low-level side platforms with a mini high-level platform.

== Gallery ==
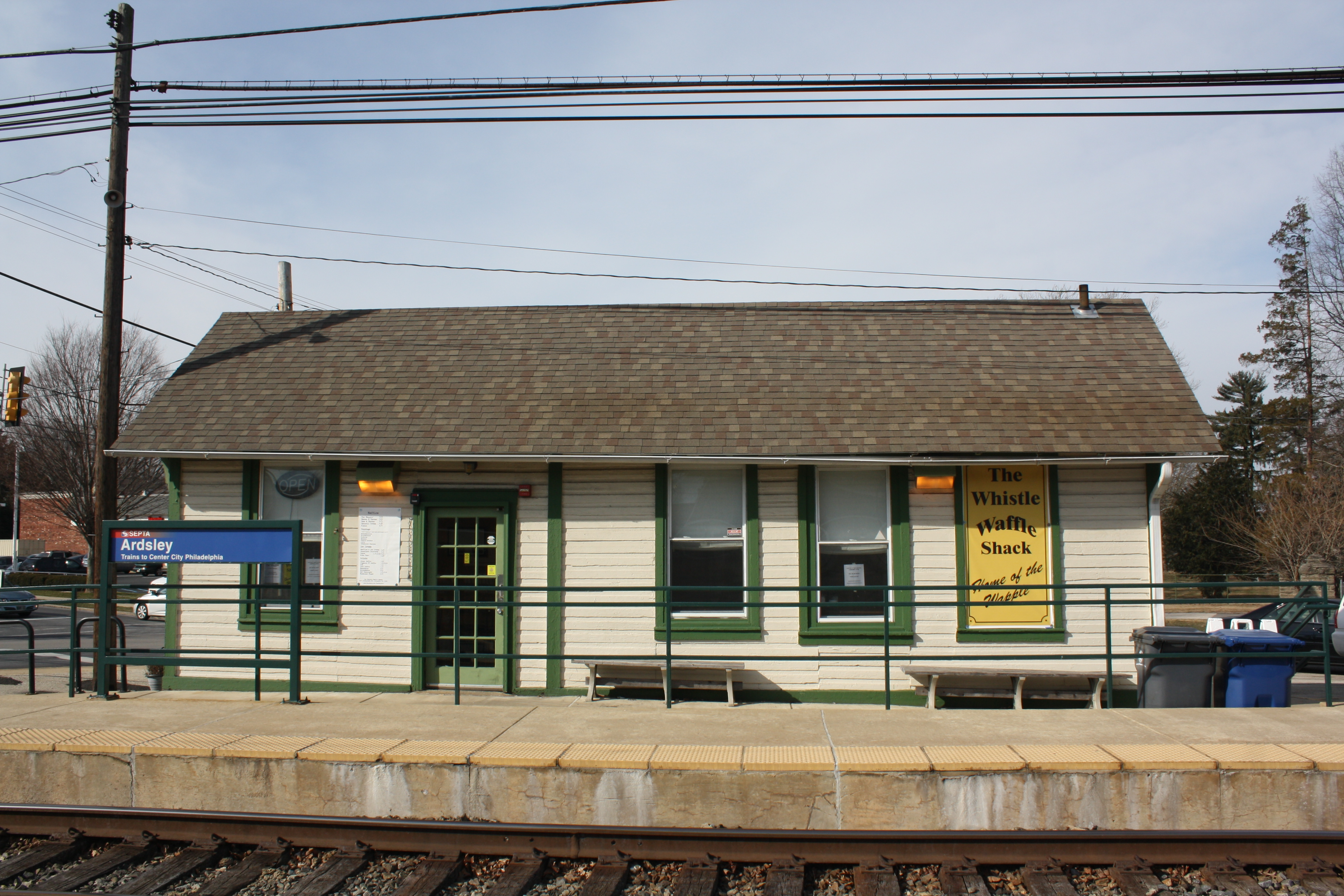

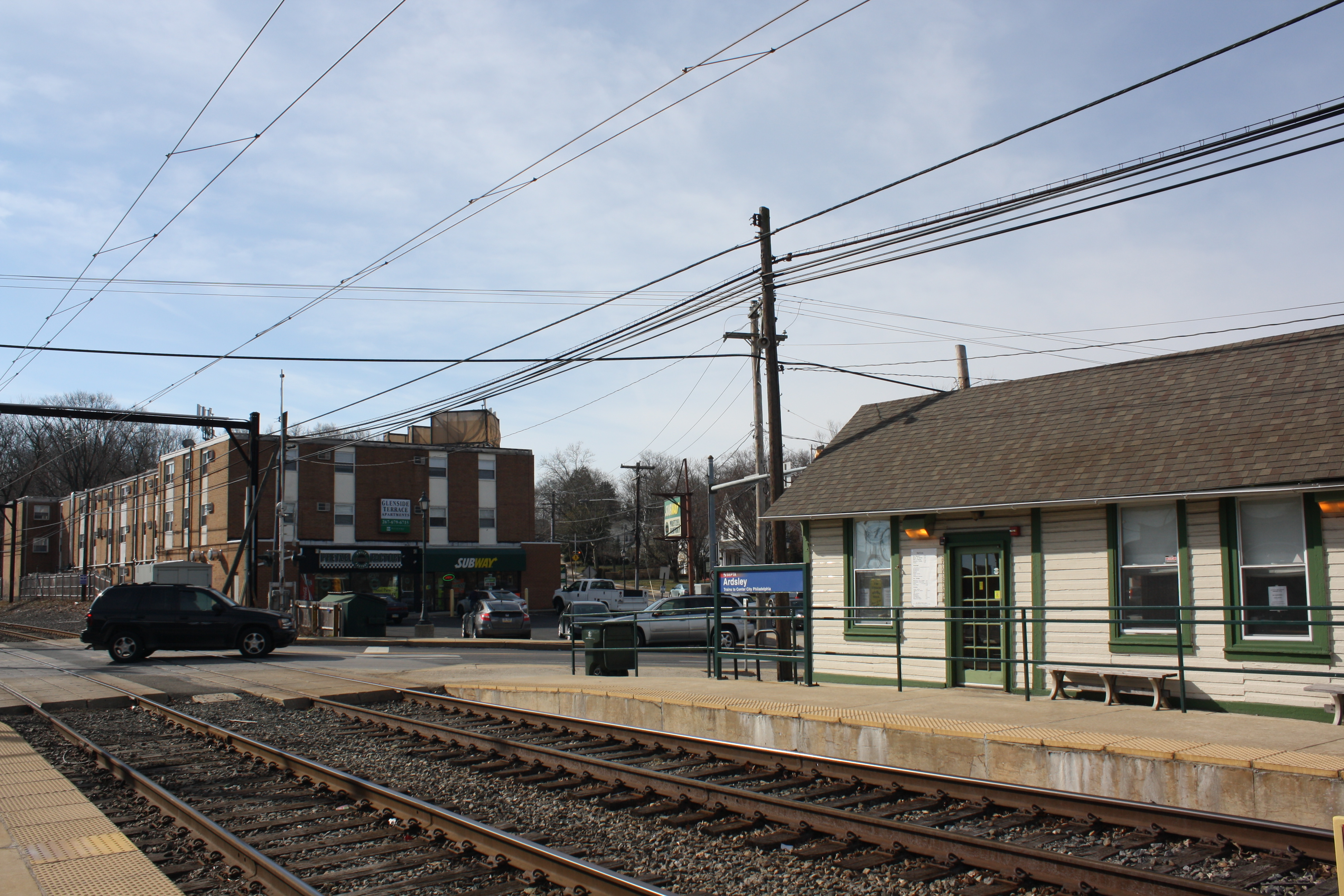

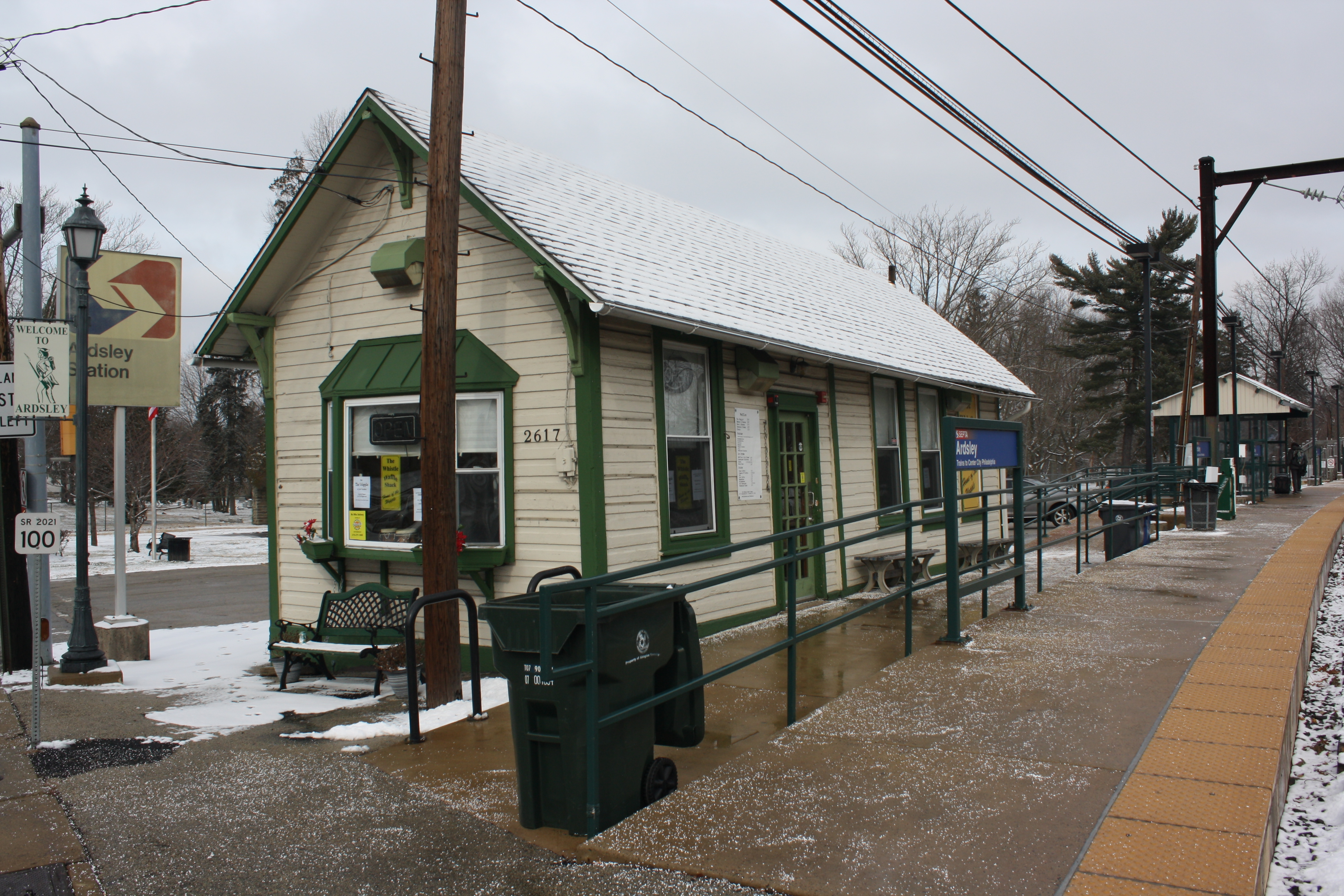

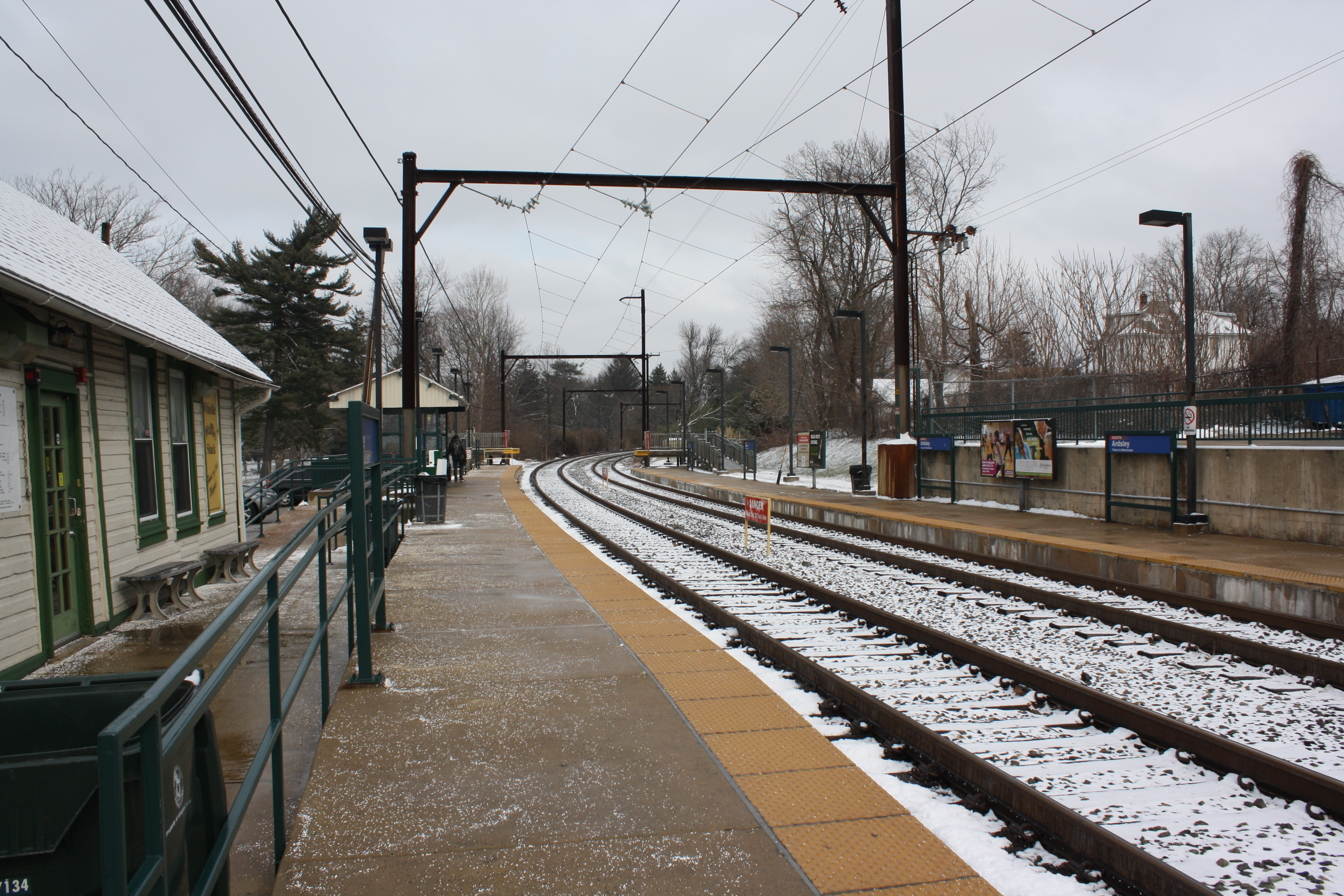
