= Ivyland station =

Ivyland

General information
- Location: Greeley Avenue, Ivyland, Pennsylvania
- System: Former Reading Railroad station
- Platforms: 1
- Tracks: 1

Construction
- Structure type: Depot
- Accessible: No

Other information
- Station code: IY

History
- Opened: March 21, 1891
- Closed: June 7, 1952

Former services
| Preceding station | Reading Railroad | Following station |
|---|---|---|
| Johnsville toward Philadelphia | New Hope Branch | Traymore toward New Hope |

Ivyland is a defunct station on the Reading Company's New Hope Branch. The station is currently on the line used by the New Hope and Ivyland Railroad. The station closed in 1952 along with the other stations north of Warminster. The station was built in 1890 and is now demolished.
