= Johnsville station =

Former Pennsylvanian railway station

Johnsville

General information
- Location: Street Road, Warminster, Pennsylvania
- System: Former Reading Railroad station

Construction
- Structure type: Shelter
- Accessible: No

History
- Opened: March 21, 1891
- Closed: 1920s
- Rebuilt: 1892

Former services
Preceding station	Reading Railroad	Following station
Bonair toward Philadelphia	New Hope Branch	Ivyland toward New Hope

Johnsville was a station on the Reading Company's New Hope Branch in Pennsylvania. The station is currently on the line used by the New Hope and Ivyland Railroad. A photo exists of the station shelter, but there are no remnants of this station surviving today.
