= Grenoble station (Pennsylvania) =

Grenoble

General information
- Location: Grenoble Road, Northampton Township, PA
- Coordinates: 40.24065°N 75.05004°W
- System: Former Reading Railroad station
- Platforms: 1
- Tracks: 2

Construction
- Structure type: Depot

Other information
- Station code: GN

History
- Opened: March 21, 1891
- Closed: June 7, 1952

Former services
Preceding station	Reading Railroad	Following station
Traymore toward Philadelphia	New Hope Branch	Rushland toward New Hope
Location

Grenoble is a defunct station on the Reading Company's New Hope Branch. The station is currently on the line used by the New Hope and Ivyland Railroad. The station was built in 1891 and closed in 1952.
