= Crestmont, Pennsylvania =

Unincorporated community in Pennsylvania, US

- Unincorporated community
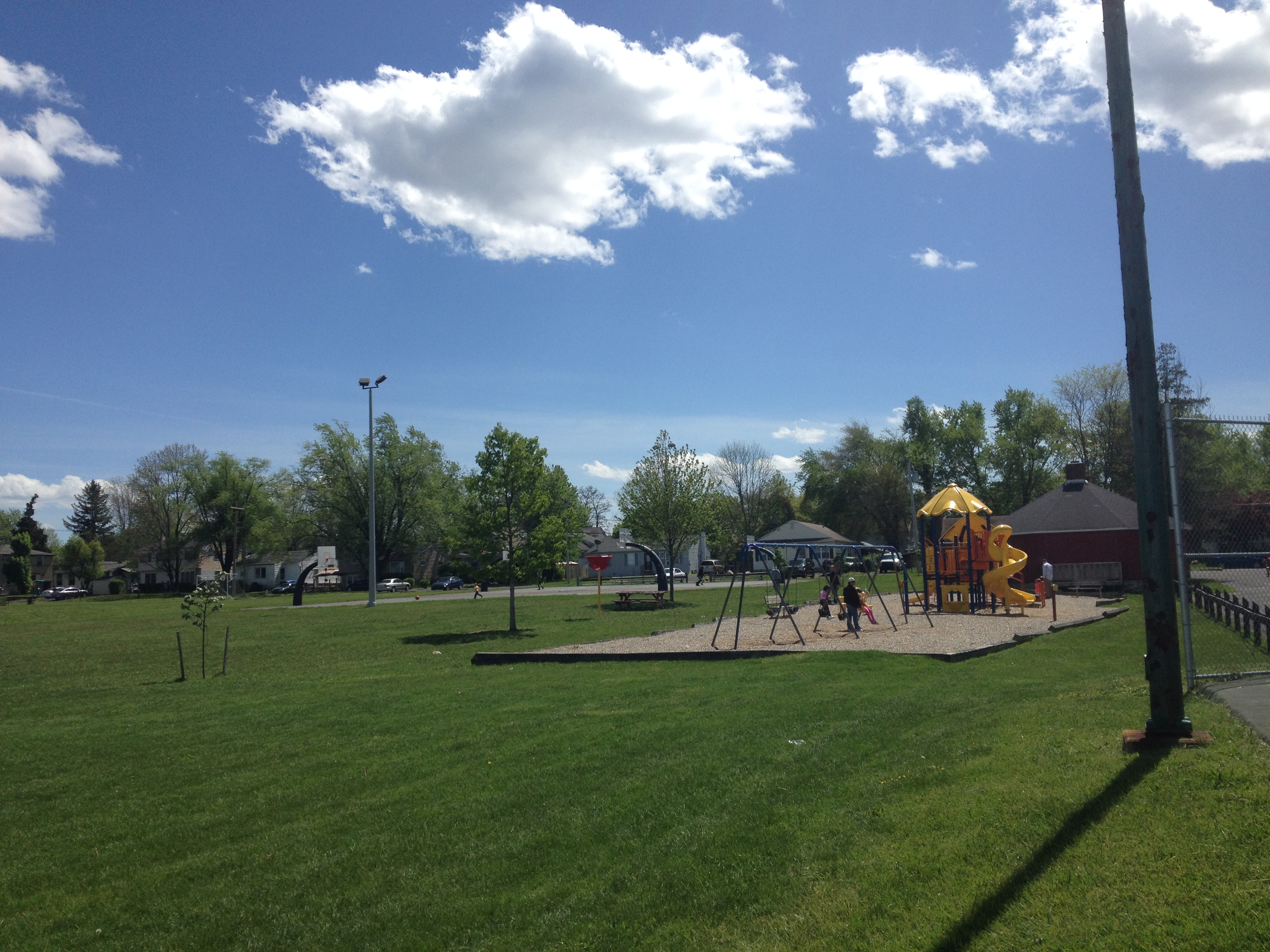
- Crestmont Park

- Location within Pennsylvania Location within the United States
- Coordinates: 40°08′08″N 75°07′41″W
- Country: United States
- State: Pennsylvania
- County: Montgomery
- Township: Abington
- Elevation: 348 ft (106 m)
- Time zone: UTC-5 (Eastern (EST))
  - Summer (DST): UTC-4 (EDT)
- ZIP code: 19090
- Area codes: 215, 267 and 445
- GNIS feature ID: 1192311

Crestmont is an unincorporated community in Abington Township in Montgomery County, Pennsylvania, United States. Crestmont is located at the intersection of Easton Road and Old Welsh Road, southwest of Willow Grove. The community is served by the Crestmont station along SEPTA Regional Rail's Warminster Line. Crestmont uses the Willow Grove ZIP code of 19090.

Crestmont Park is located in Crestmont at Old Welsh Road at Reservoir Avenue across from the Willow Grove Park Mall. The 19.4-acre park, which is owned by Abington Parks & Recreation, consists of basketball and tennis courts, a softball field, ice skating area, swimming pool, and playground.

Crestmont is one of the oldest neighborhoods in Abington Township.

The Montgomery County Housing Authority operates the Crest Manor public housing community in the Crestmont neighborhood.

== History ==
According to the Abington Township Police Department, Crestmont saw a rise in crime in the 1980s due to the crack epidemic.
