= Grenoble (disambiguation) =

Grenoble is a city in France.

Grenoble may also refer to:

- Arrondissement of Grenoble
- Grenoble metropolitan area
- Grenoble station, the main railway station in Grenoble
- Grenoble Foot 38, an association football club
- FC Grenoble, a rugby union club
- FC Grenoble (basketball), 1920–1945

== Other uses ==
- Grenoble station (Pennsylvania), a defunct railway station in Northampton Township, Pennsylvania, US
- Lenore Grenoble, American linguist
