= Hatboro station =

Railway station in Hatboro, Pennsylvania

Hatboro
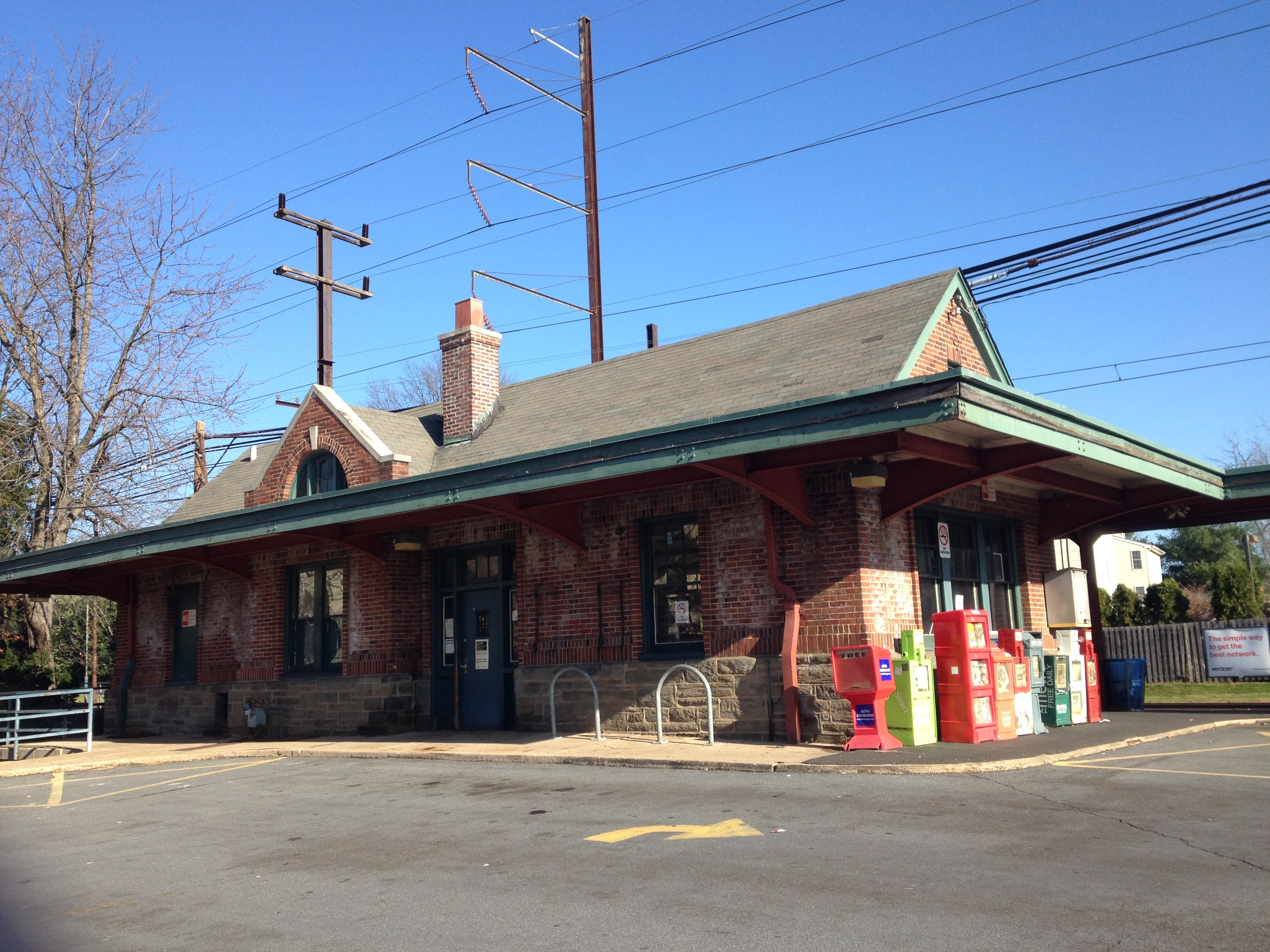

General information
- Location: 21 South Penn Street; Hatboro, Pennsylvania
- Coordinates: 40.1756°N 75.1030°W
- Owner: SEPTA
- Line: Warminster Branch
- Platforms: 1 side platform
- Tracks: 1

Construction
- Parking: 175 spaces
- Accessible: No

Other information
- Fare zone: 3

History
- Opened: 1871
- Rebuilt: December 1934–June 1, 1935
- Electrified: July 26, 1931

Passengers
- 2017: 500 boardings 530 alightings (weekday average)
- Rank: 51 of 146

Services
Preceding station	SEPTA	Following station
Willow Grove toward Penn Medicine Station	Warminster Line	Warminster Terminus
Fulmor Closed 1996 toward Penn Medicine Station	Warminster Line	Warminster Terminus
Former services
Preceding station	Reading Railroad	Following station
Fulmor toward Philadelphia	New Hope Branch	Warminster toward New Hope
Location

Hatboro station is a rail station on SEPTA Regional Rail's Warminster Line, formerly the Reading Railroad's New Hope Branch, in Hatboro, Pennsylvania. It was once the terminus for electrified multiple-unit trains (EMUs), which was extended to Warminster in 1974. Current trains stopping at Hatboro station are the SEPTA Silverliner IV and the SEPTA Silverliner V. The station is located at the intersection of Byberry Road and Penn Street. The station features a passing siding for handling multiple trains as well as a 100-space parking lot. The current brick construction station stands at 20' x 55' and was built in 1935. An original wood construction freight station was completed in 1871 but no longer stands at the site.

== Description ==
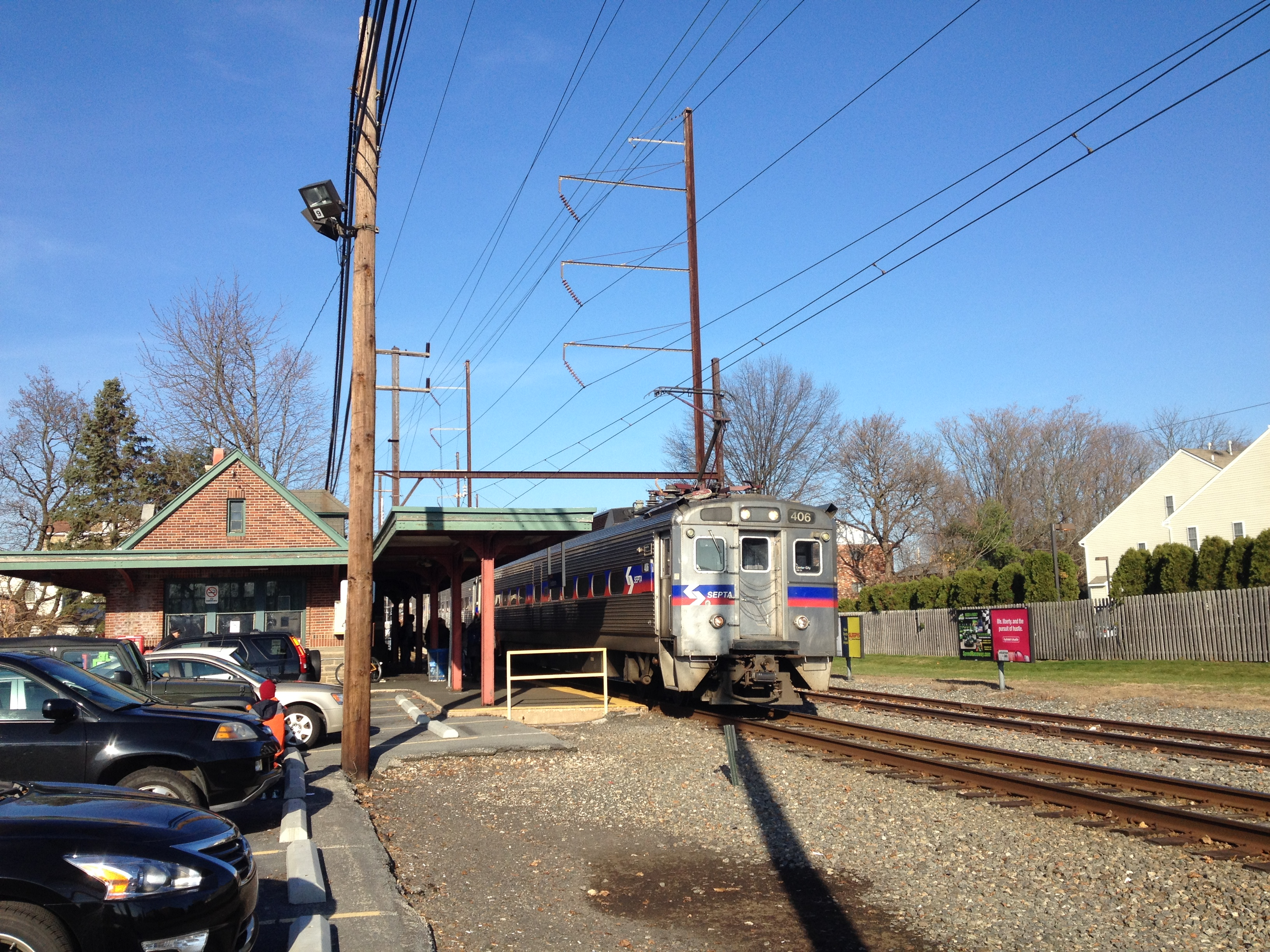
A Center City-bound train stops at the Hatboro station

Hatboro station consists of a side platform along the tracks. The station has a waiting room that is open on weekday mornings; the ticket office closed on September 20, 2024. Hatboro station has a parking lot with 100 spaces, with a remote parking area across Byberry Road that contains 75 spaces. Both parking lots charge $2 a day. Parking is also provided at the Hatboro Municipal Parking Lot across Moreland Avenue, which has 93 spaces and charges $1 a day.

Train service at Hatboro station is provided along the Warminster Line of SEPTA Regional Rail, which runs south to Center City Philadelphia and north one stop to its terminus at Warminster. Hatboro station is located in fare zone 3. Service is provided daily from early morning to late evening. Most Warminster Line trains continue through the Center City Commuter Connection tunnel and become Airport Line trains, providing service to the Philadelphia International Airport. In FY 2013, Hatboro station had a weekday average of 457 boardings and 430 alightings.
