= Warminster Line =

SEPTA Regional Rail service

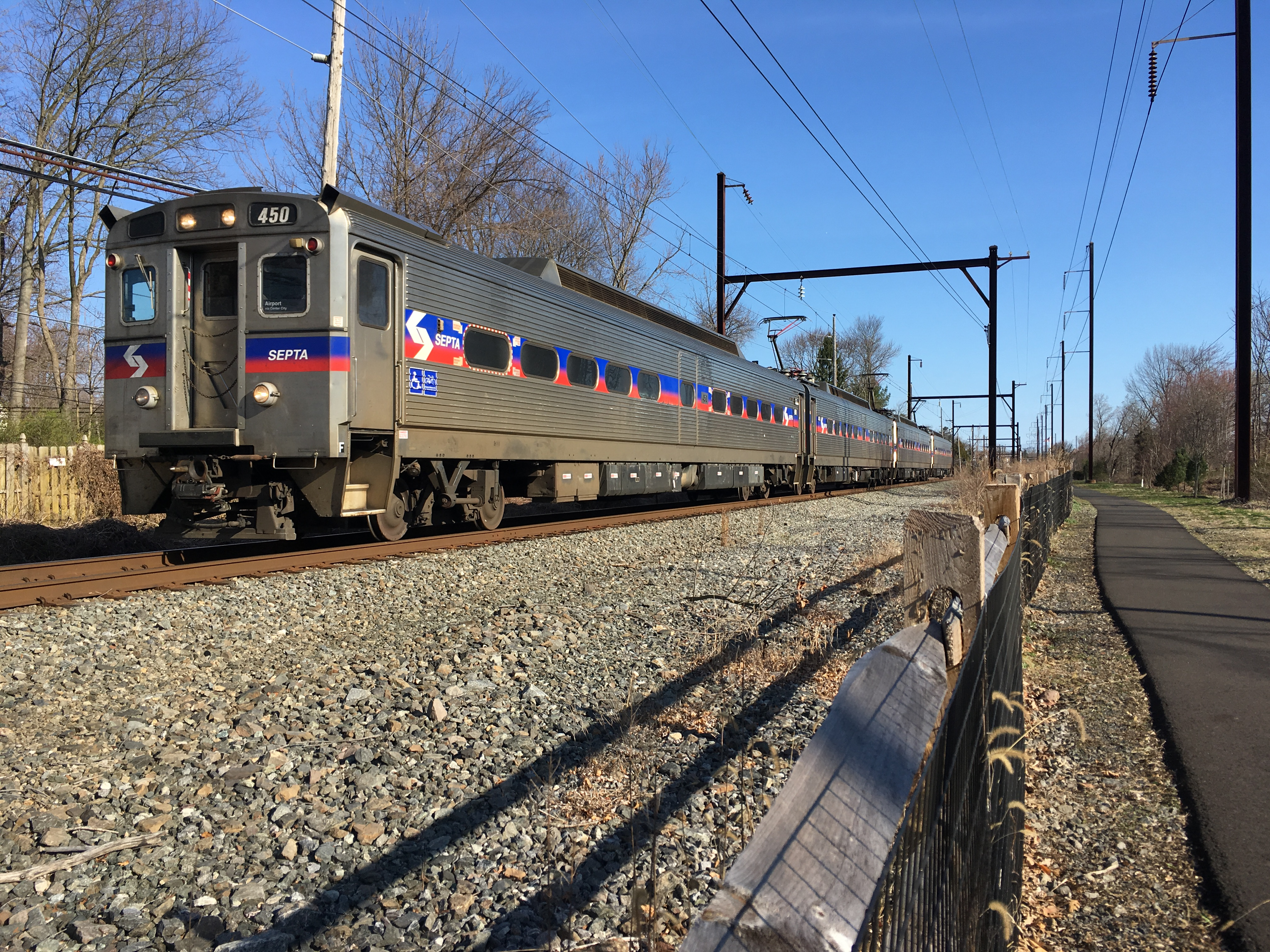
- A southbound Warminster Line train between the Hatboro and Willow Grove stations

Overview
- Service type: SEPTA Regional Rail commuter service
- Current operator: SEPTA
- Daily ridership: 5,362 (FY 2025)

Route
- Termini: Warminster; Penn Medicine Station
- Stops: 17
- Lines used: Warminster Branch; SEPTA Main Line

Technical
- Rolling stock: Electric multiple units
- Electrification: Overhead line, 12 kV 25 Hz AC

The Warminster Line is a route of the SEPTA Regional Rail commuter rail system. It serves stations between its namesake town, Warminster, and Center City Philadelphia. Half of the route is shared by other lines, including the Lansdale/Doylestown Line, West Trenton Line, Fox Chase Line, Chestnut Hill East Line, Chestnut Hill West Line, and Manayunk/Norristown Line. All trains continue as part of the Airport Line with the exception of some weekday trains that terminate at 30th Street Station, Thorndale, or Trenton Transit Center.

== Route ==
The Warminster Line uses the SEPTA Main Line between Center City and Glenside station, where it branches off onto the Warminster Branch to Hatboro and Warminster. The tracks continue past Warminster to Ivyland and eventually to New Hope, where the New Hope Railroad runs heritage excursion trains.

The Warminster Line becomes a single-track line just north of Ardsley, but was once double-tracked as far north as Roslyn, the original northbound track being removed in 2010. A passing siding exists north of Willow Grove. There is also a second storage track at the Hatboro station and the line becomes double-tracked again as it approaches the terminus at Warminster station.

== History ==
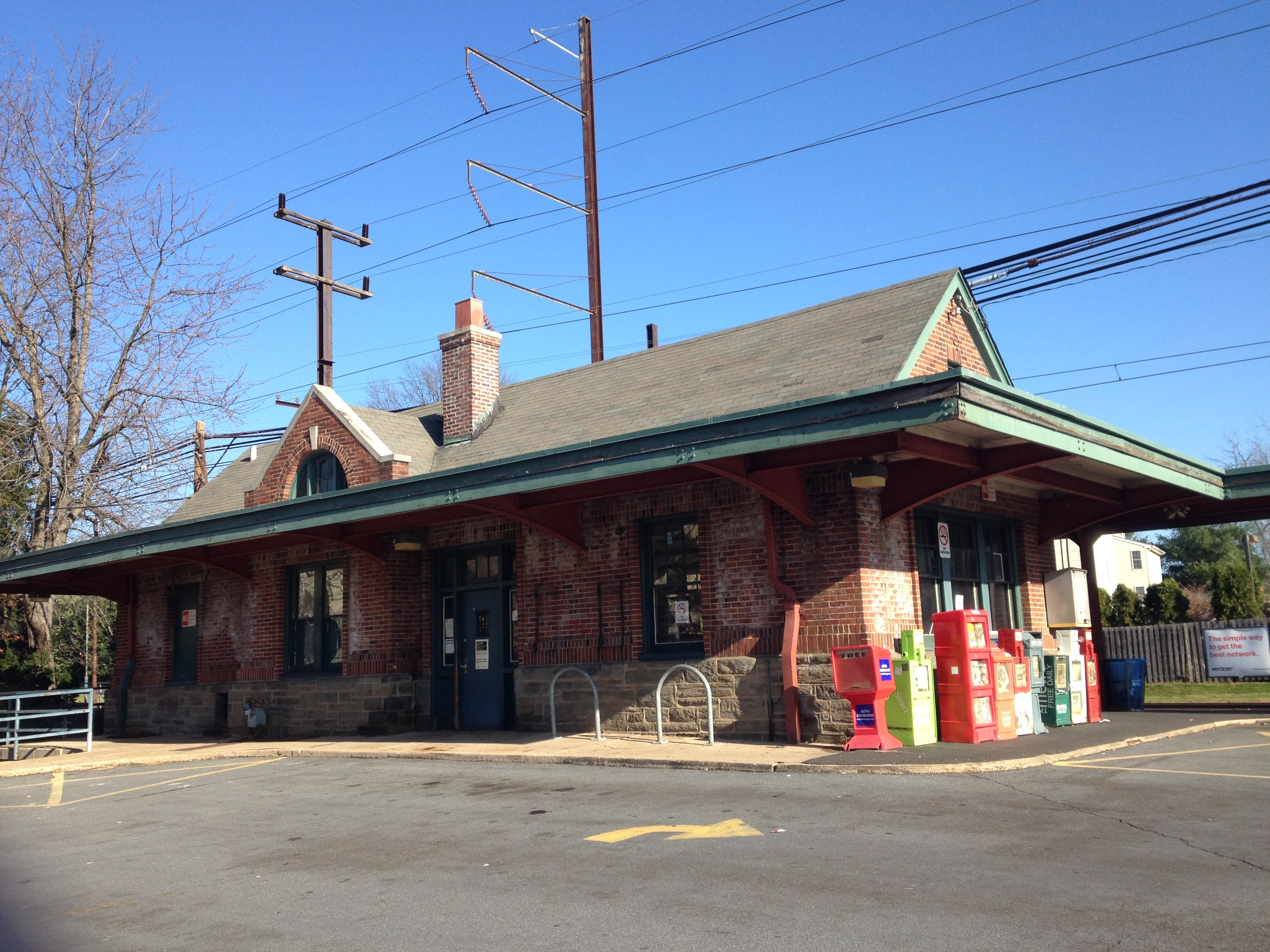
Hatboro station was the extent of electrified service until 1974

The logo for the Warminister Line

The Warminster Line is a continuation of the Reading Company's suburban services over the Warminster Branch. The line was built between 1872 and 1874 and electrified as far as Hatboro in 1931. Passenger service beyond Hatboro ended in 1952. The Reading extended electrification and suburban service to Warminster on July 29, 1974.

With the Reading's final bankruptcy in 1976 Conrail took over the operation of the trains and ownership of the branch. The Warminster Branch was conveyed to SEPTA in 1979; SEPTA took over operation of the trains in 1983. A train crash occurred on July 1, 2006, in Abington Township injuring 38 passengers and 6 crew members.

Beginning in 1984 the route was designated R2 Warminster as part of SEPTA's diametrical reorganization of its lines. Warminster Line trains operated through the city center to the Wilmington/Newark Line (then Marcus Hook) on the ex-Pennsylvania side of the system. The R-number naming system was dropped on July 25, 2010. As of 2026 the majority of Warminster trains continue on to the Airport Line.

On April 18, 2016, SEPTA launched positive train control on the Warminster Line, the first Regional Rail line to use the signal system which will enhance safety.

=== Potential for expansion beyond Warminster ===
In a 1991 report, the Delaware Valley Regional Planning Commission ranked the line between Warminster and New Hope as having "medium potential" for reuse based on projected growth in population and employment in the region. It noted that SEPTA considered the line a "long range transit opportunity corridor."

== Stations ==
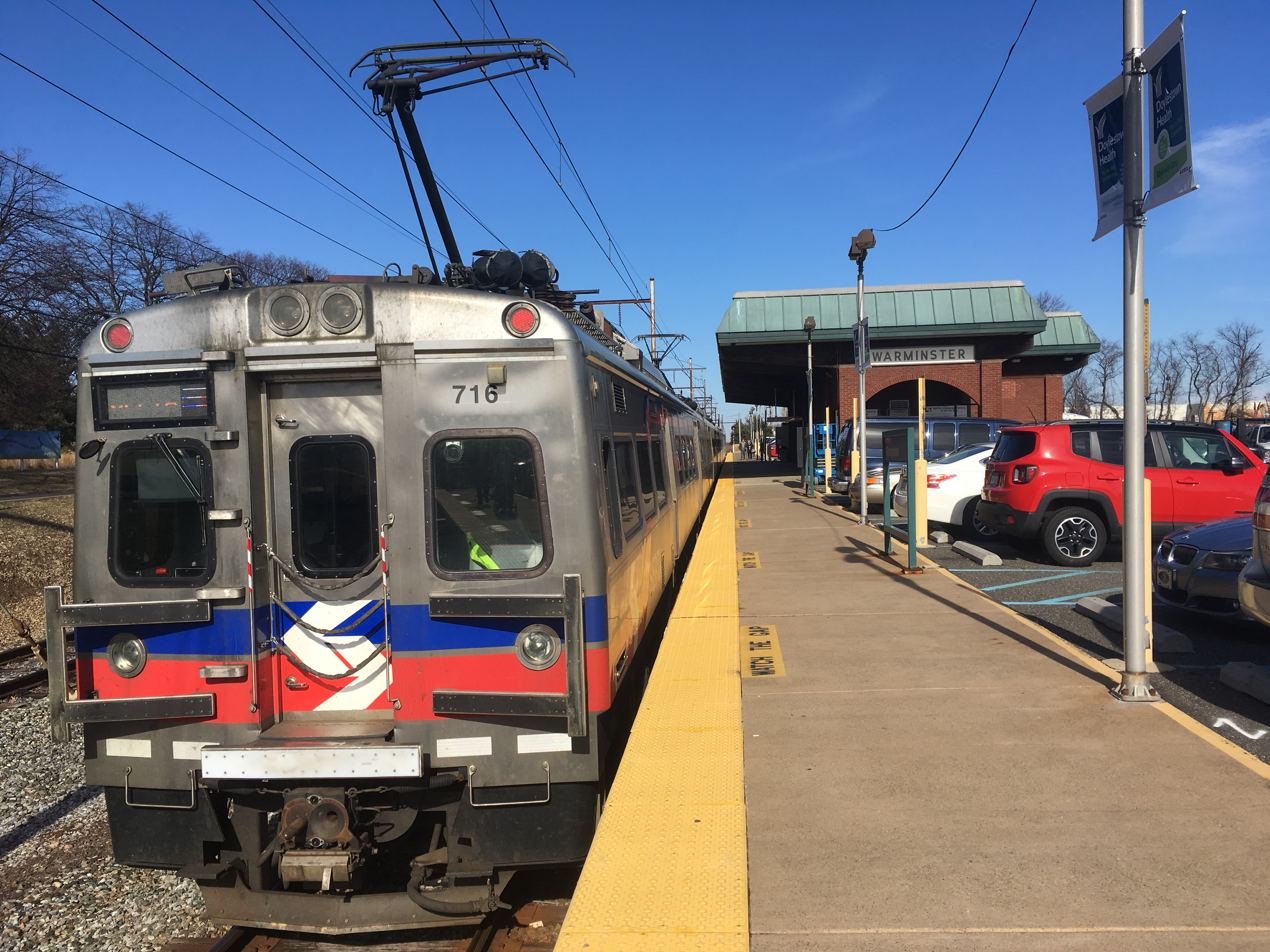
Warminster station, which serves as the terminus of the Warminster Line

The Warminster Line includes the following stations north of the Center City Commuter Connection; stations indicated with gray background area closed.

Zone	Location	Station	Miles (km) from Center City	Date opened	Connections / notes
C	Temple University	Temple University	2.1 (3.4)		SEPTA Regional Rail: all lines
1	Nicetown–Tioga, Philadelphia	Wayne Junction	5.1 (8.2)		SEPTA Regional Rail: SEPTA City Bus: 2, 23, 53; SEPTA Trackless Trolley: 75
1	Olney-Oak Lane, Philadelphia				
1	Olney-Oak Lane, Philadelphia	Logan			Discontinued on October 4, 1992
1	Olney-Oak Lane, Philadelphia	Tabor			Closed 1992
1	Olney-Oak Lane, Philadelphia	Fern Rock T.C.	7.3 (11.7)		SEPTA Regional Rail: SEPTA Metro: SEPTA City Bus: 4, 28, 57, 70
2	Melrose Park	Melrose Park	8.4 (13.5)		SEPTA Regional Rail:
2	Elkins Park	Elkins Park	9.2 (14.8)	May 14, 1899	SEPTA Regional Rail: SEPTA City Bus: 28
3	Jenkintown	Jenkintown–Wyncote	10.8 (17.4)		SEPTA Regional Rail: SEPTA City Bus: 77
3	Glenside	Glenside	11.9 (19.2)		SEPTA Regional Rail: SEPTA City Bus: 22, 77
3	Glenside	Ardsley	13.0 (20.9)		
3	Roslyn	Roslyn	14.2 (22.9)		SEPTA City Bus: 22
3	Abington	Crestmont	15.4 (24.8)		
3	Willow Grove	Willow Grove	16.2 (26.1)		SEPTA City Bus: 22, 55
3	Upper Moreland Twp.	Fulmor	18.1 (29.1)		Closed November 10, 1996
3	Hatboro	Hatboro	18.6 (29.9)		
3	Warminster	Warminster	20.1 (32.3)	July 29, 1974	SEPTA City Bus: 22; TMA Bucks: Rushbus; BCT: DART East

== Ridership ==
Between FY 2013–FY 2019 yearly ridership on the Warminster Line ranged between 2.3 and 2.7 million before collapsing during the COVID-19 pandemic. (Note: Data for individual lines is not available for FY 2020.)
