= Ardsley (automobile) =

Defunct American motor vehicle manufacturer

Ardsley Motor Car Company
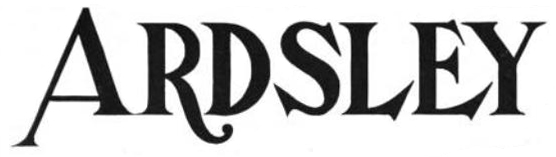
- Industry: Automotive
- Founded: 1905
- Defunct: 1906
- Headquarters: Yonkers, New York
- Products: Automobiles

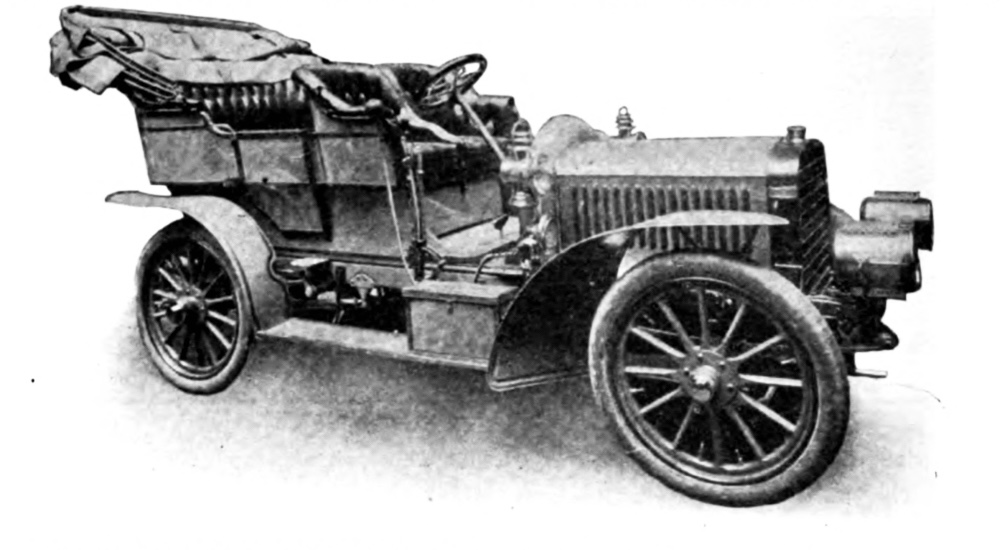
Ardsley Model B 35-40 (1906)

The Ardsley was a short-lived American automobile designed by W. S. Howard and manufactured from 1905 to 1906 in Yonkers, New York, by the Ardsley Motor Car Company.

== History ==
The company salesrooms were located at 50th Street and Broadway in Yonkers.

By 1906, the automobile was advertised in a national automobile trade magazine as "quiet and powerful." It had 35 horsepower, could seat five and was priced at US$3,500. The displacement of the four-cylinder Model B was 6470 cc with a bore of 117.475 mm and a stroke of 149.225 mm. The engine reached 35 horsepower at 900 RPM, at 1500 RPM it was 40 horsepower, hence the designation 35-40 horsepower. The transmission had three gears. The wheelbase was 2540 mm. The vehicle weight was 1021 kg.

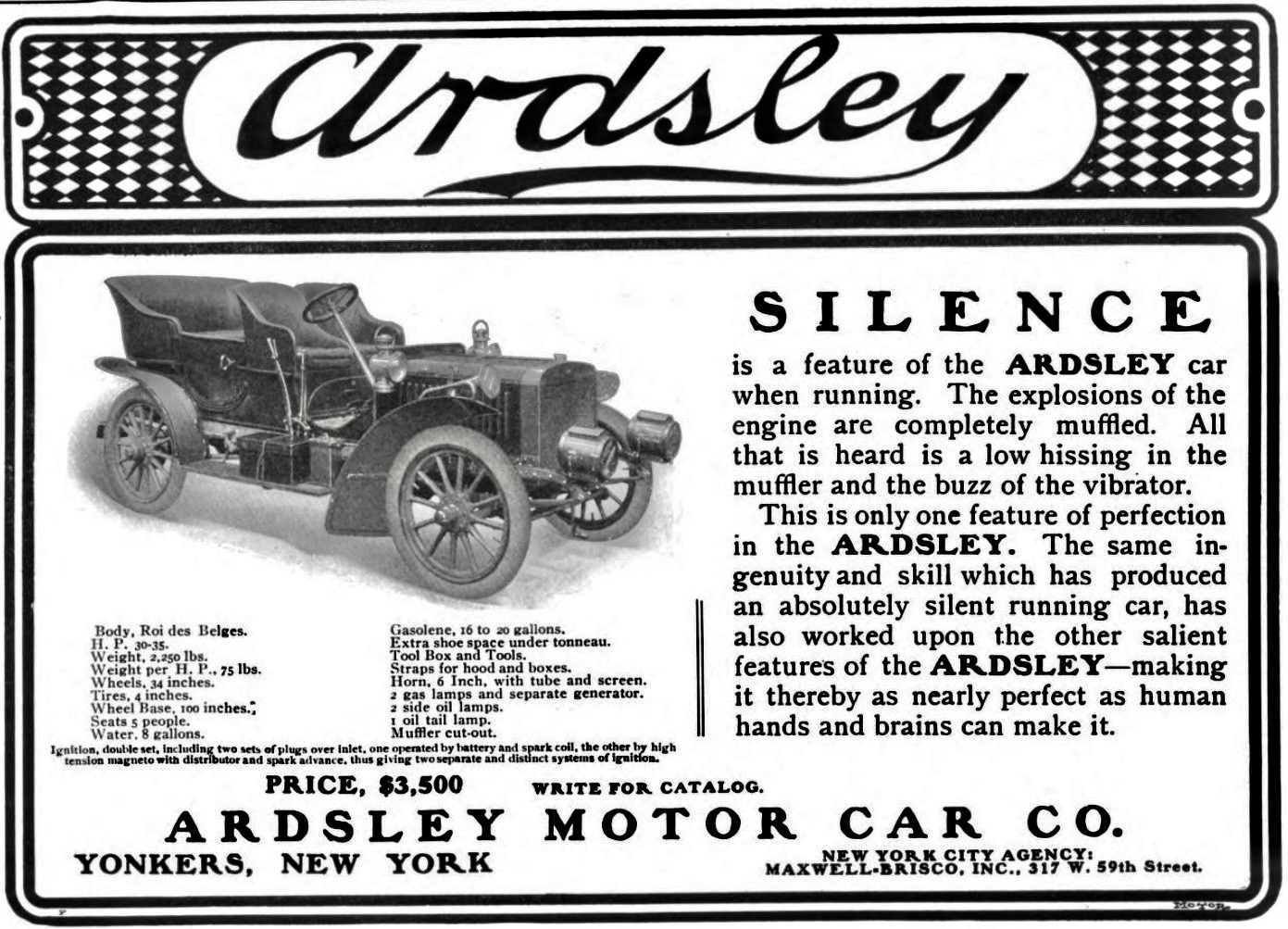
Ardsley Model A 30-35 (1905)

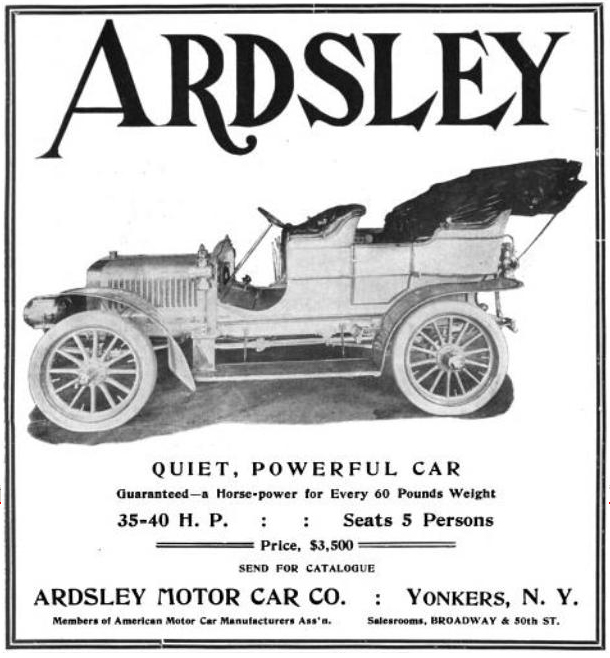
Ardsley Motor Car Company of Yonkers, New York - 1906 model

== Production models ==
- Ardsley Model A (1905) 30-35 HP
- Ardsley Model B (1906) 35-40 HP
