= Ardsley, Pennsylvania =

Unincorporated community in Pennsylvania, US

- Unincorporated community
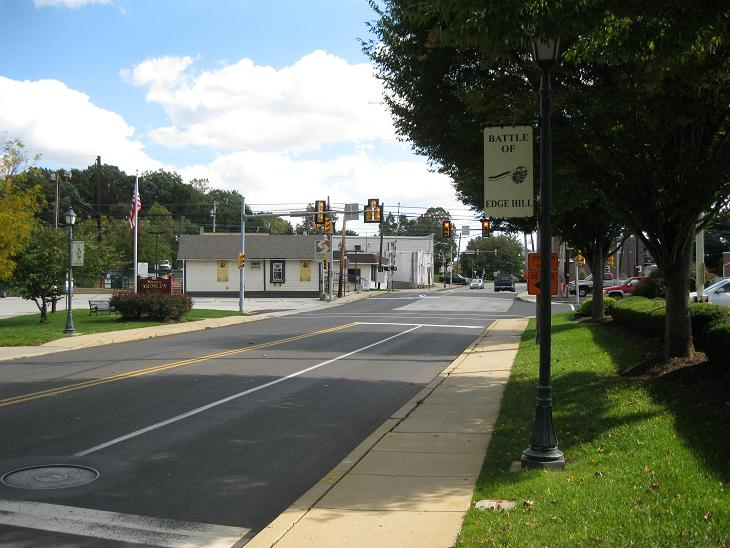
- Jenkintown Road in Ardsley, looking southeast to the SEPTA crossing and two Edge Hill Road traffic signals. Several Battle of Edge Hill signs line the road.

- Location within the U.S. state of Pennsylvania Ardsley (the United States)
- Coordinates: 40°7′16″N 75°9′19″W
- Country: United States
- State: Pennsylvania
- County: Montgomery
- Township: Abington
- Elevation: 289 ft (88 m)
- Time zone: UTC-5 (Eastern (EST))
  - Summer (DST): UTC-4 (EDT)
- ZIP codes: 19038
- GNIS feature ID: 1192082

Ardsley is an unincorporated community located in Abington Township, as well as Upper Dublin Township, Montgomery County, Pennsylvania, United States. It is a neighbor of Glenside. A large portion of this neighborhood is composed of the historic cemeteries Hillside Cemetery and Ardsley Burial Park. It is the location of the Ardsley SEPTA station.

On December 7, 1777, the Battle of Edge Hill was fought in the area. British forces attacked American troops posted on Edge Hill, which runs from southwest to northeast along the present-day Willow Grove Avenue and Edge Hill Road. Near where Limekiln Pike crosses Edge Hill, British and Hessian light infantry routed a force of Pennsylvania militia and the 2nd Connecticut Regiment led by Joseph Reed. Farther to the northeast on Edge Hill, riflemen and Maryland militia commanded by Daniel Morgan put up a tougher fight before falling back to join the main army at Camp Hill and Fort Washington.

In 2001, the area was heavily damaged by Tropical Storm Allison. A township project was undertaken to stop future flooding. This project included the re-creation of a drainage basin known locally as "Floaties Pond", which has worked well in that not much more flooding has occurred.

== Places of interest ==
- Ardsley Park
- Ardsley Community Center
- Ardsley SEPTA station
- Ardsley Cemetery
- Ardsley Wildlife Sanctuary (previously "The Dark Woods")
- Joe's Meat Market

== Gallery ==
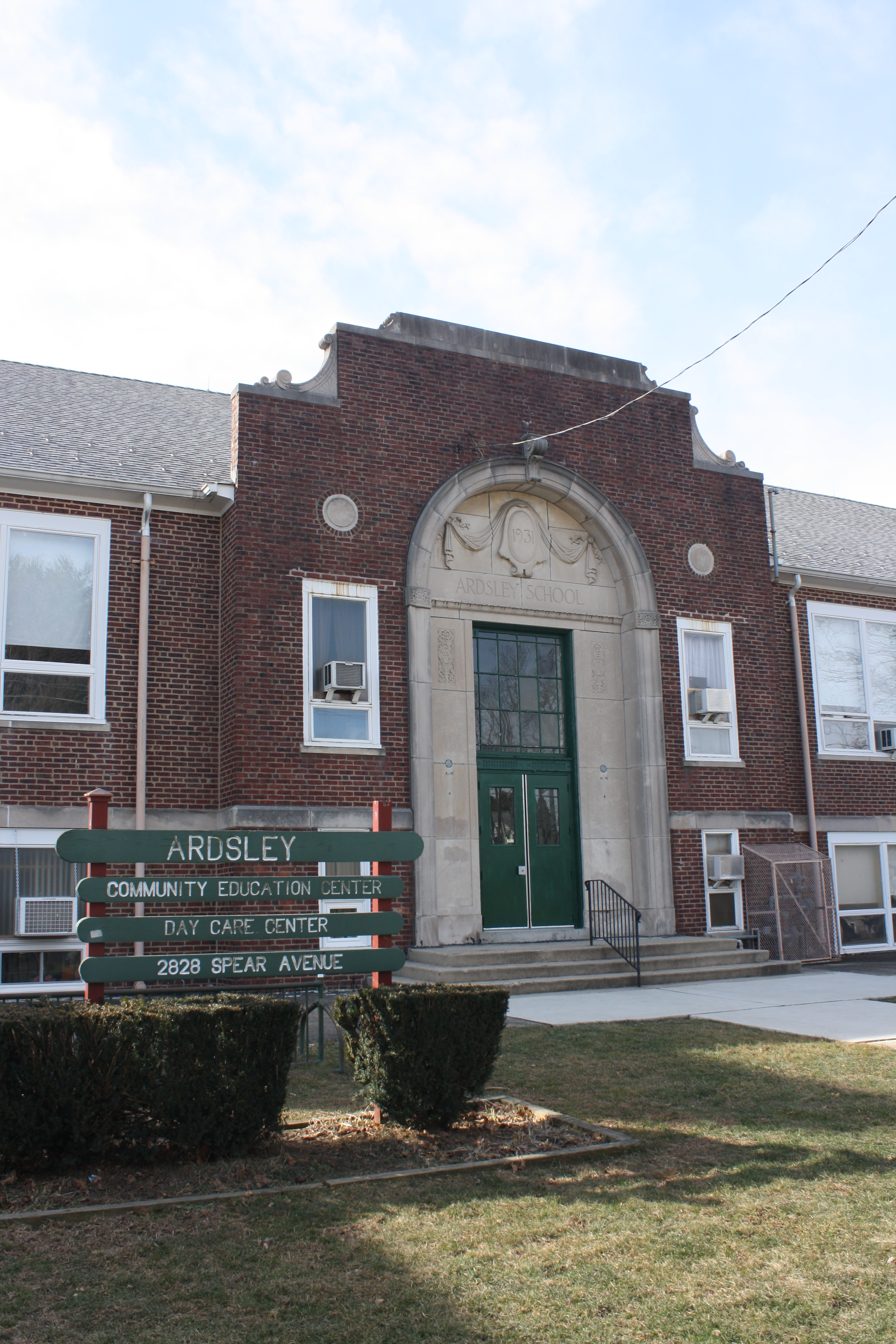
Ardsley Community Center.

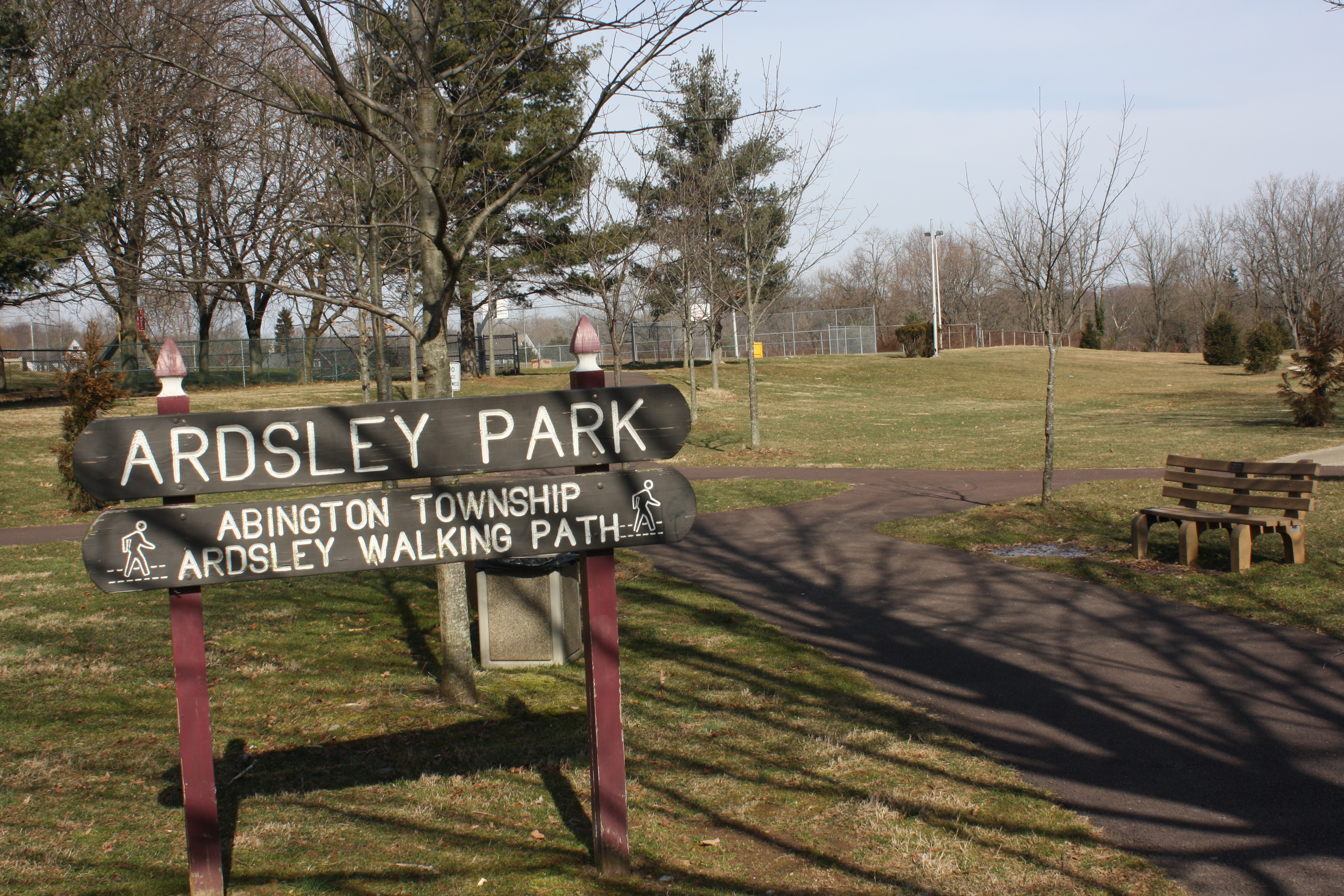
Ardsley Park.

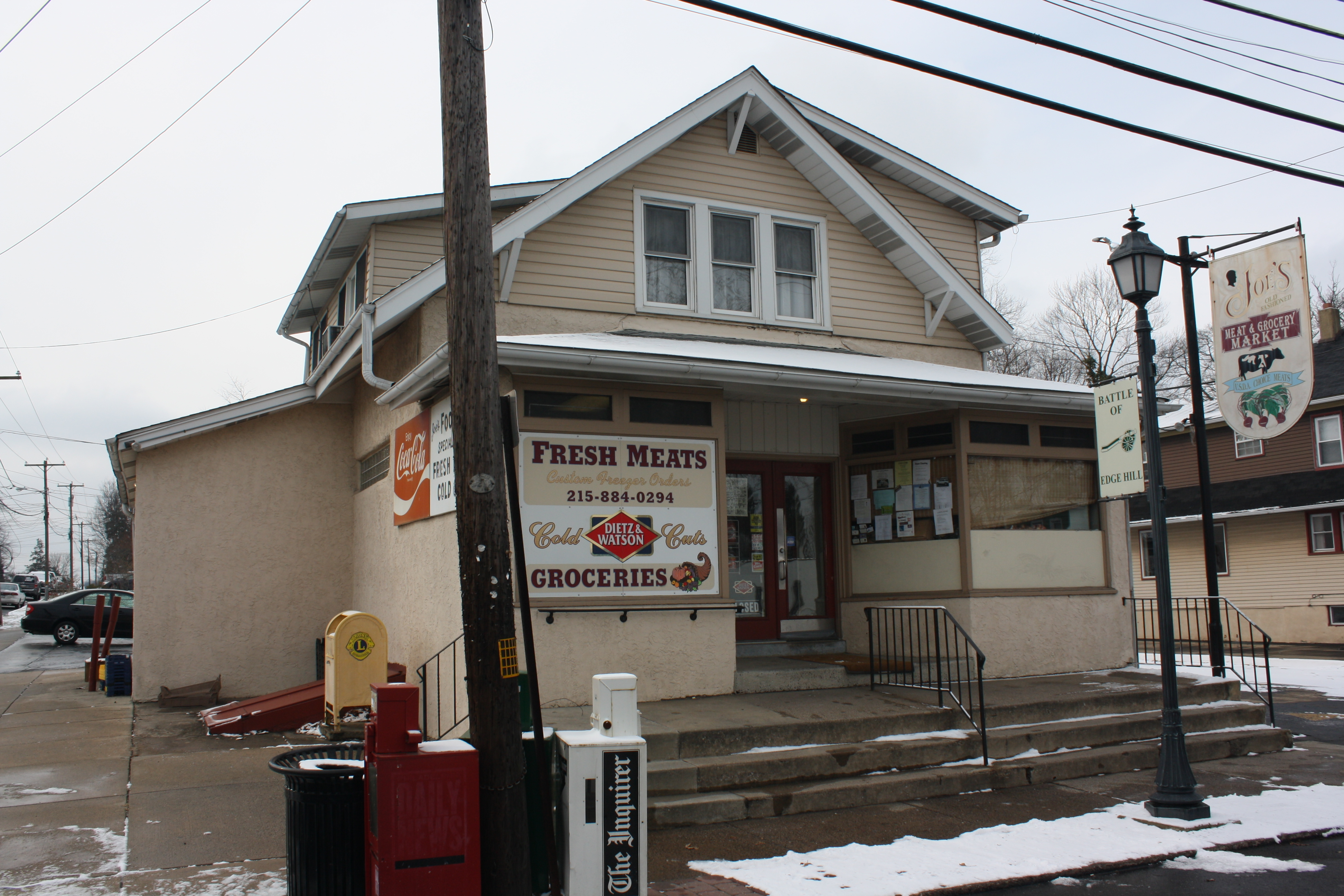
Joe's Meat Market.

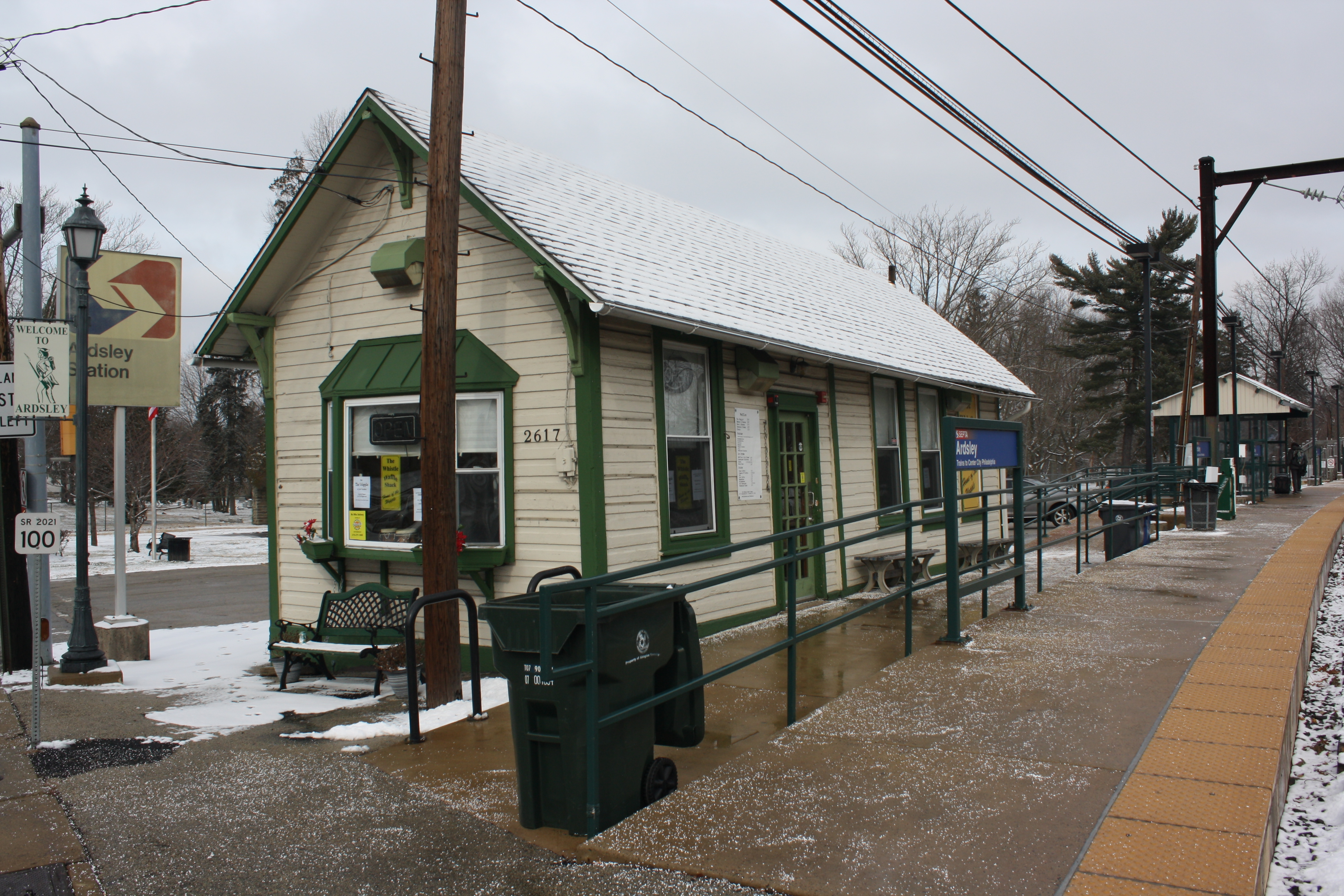
Ardsley SEPTA station.
