= Warminster station (SEPTA) =

SEPTA railway station in Warminster, Pennsylvania

Warminster
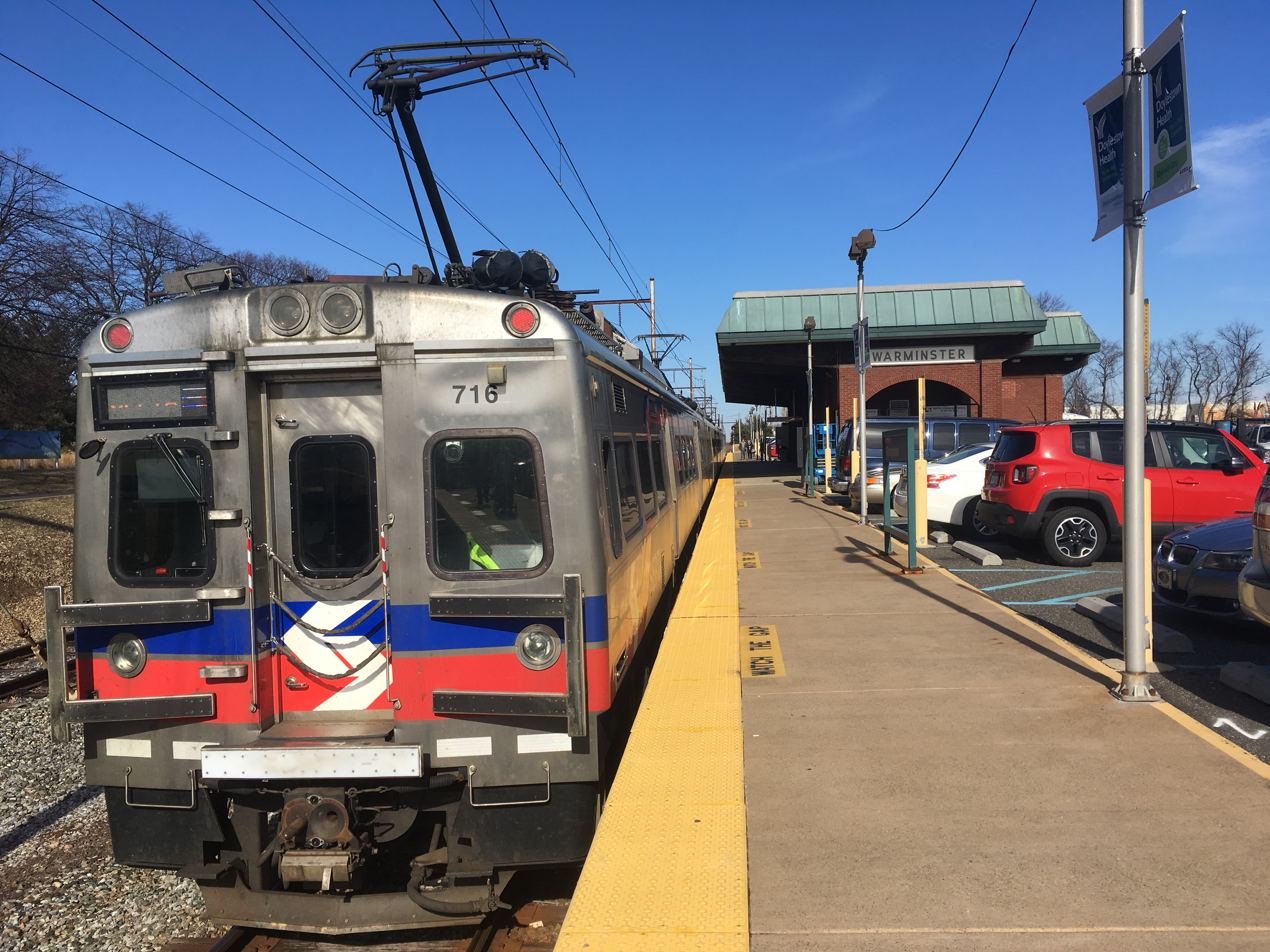
- Warminster station in February 2018

General information
- Location: Jacksonville Road and Station Drive; Warminster, Pennsylvania 18974
- Coordinates: 40.1951°N 75.0889°W
- Owner: SEPTA
- Line: Warminster Branch
- Platforms: 1 side platform
- Tracks: 2
- Connections: New Hope Railroad; SEPTA City Bus: 22; TMA Bucks: Richboro-Warminster Rushbus; BCT: DART East

Construction
- Parking: 800 spaces
- Cycle facilities: Four racks
- Accessible: yes

Other information
- Station code: WAR
- Fare zone: 3

History
- Opened: July 29, 1974
- Electrified: 1974

Passengers
- 2017: 1,058 boardings 1,110 alightings (weekday average)
- Rank: 16 of 146

Services
Preceding station	New Hope Railroad	Following station
Terminus	Main Line	Rushland toward New Hope
Preceding station	SEPTA	Following station
Hatboro toward Penn Medicine Station	Warminster Line	Terminus
Former services at Bonair
Preceding station	Reading Railroad	Following station
Hatboro toward Philadelphia	New Hope Branch	Johnsville toward New Hope
Location

Warminster station is a SEPTA Regional Rail station that is located in Warminster, Pennsylvania in the United States. It serves as the north end of the Warminster Line and is wheelchair ADA accessible.

This station is also occasionally served by passenger trains operated by the New Hope Railroad, which has an interchange just north of the station with Pennsylvania Northeastern Railroad.

== History and description ==
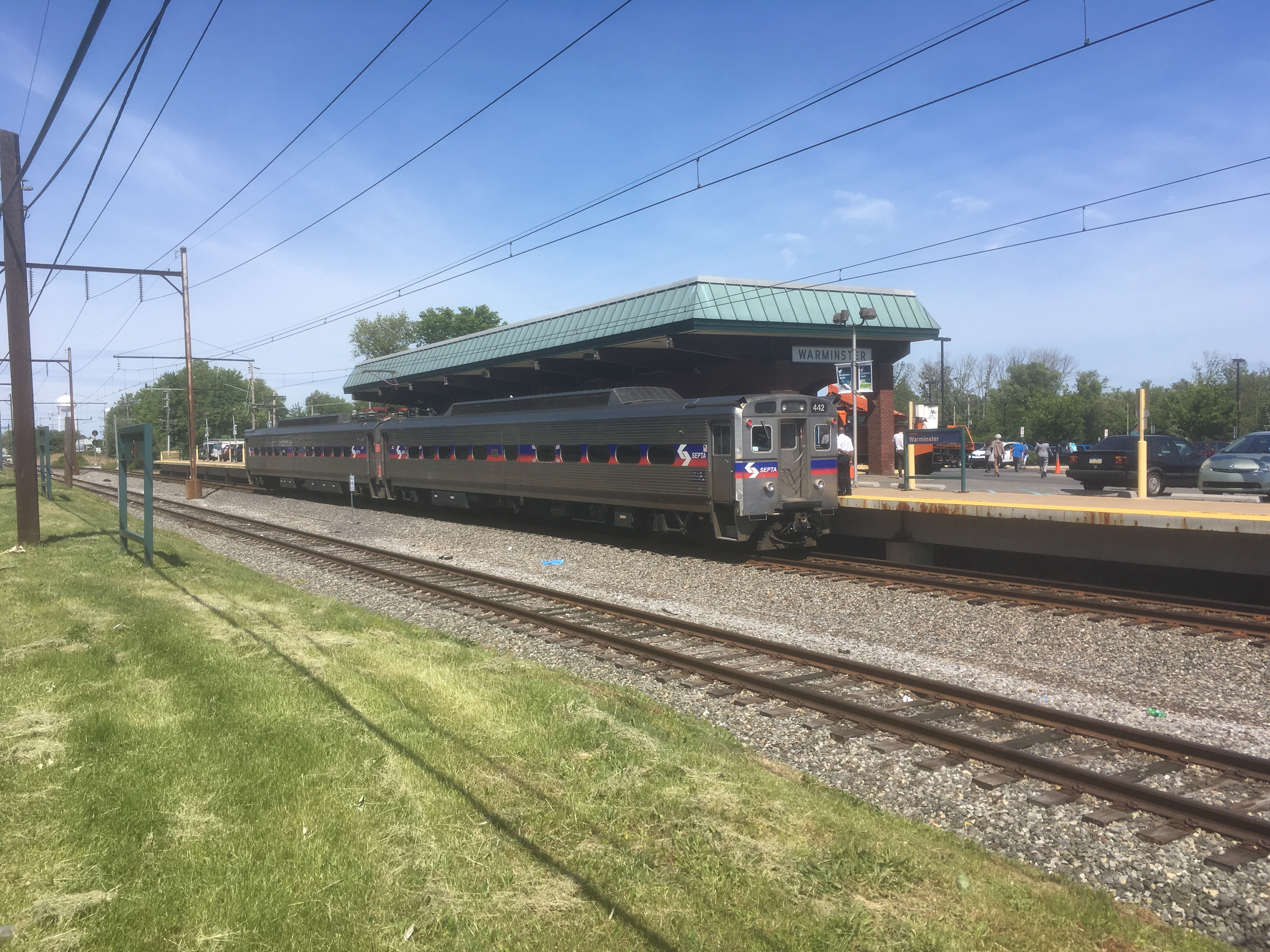
An outbound train arrives at Warminster station in May 2017

Original electrification from Hatboro was extended to Warminster on July 29, 1974, replacing the former Reading Company Bonair station.

The current Warminster station consists of a side platform along the tracks that is wheelchair accessible. The station has a ticket office and waiting room that is open on weekday mornings. There are four bike racks available that can hold up to eight bicycles. Warminster station has a daily parking lot with 562 spaces that charges $1 a day and a permit parking lot with 238 spaces that charges $25 a month.

Train service at Warminster station is provided along the Warminster Line of SEPTA Regional Rail, which begins at the station and runs south to Center City Philadelphia. Warminster station is located in fare zone 3. Service is provided daily from early morning to late evening. Most Warminster Line trains continue through the Center City Commuter Connection tunnel as part of the Airport Line, providing through service to Philadelphia International Airport. In FY 2017, Warminster station had a weekday average of 1,058 boardings and 1,110 alightings.
