= New Hope station =

Heritage railroad station in Pennsylvania, US

New Hope
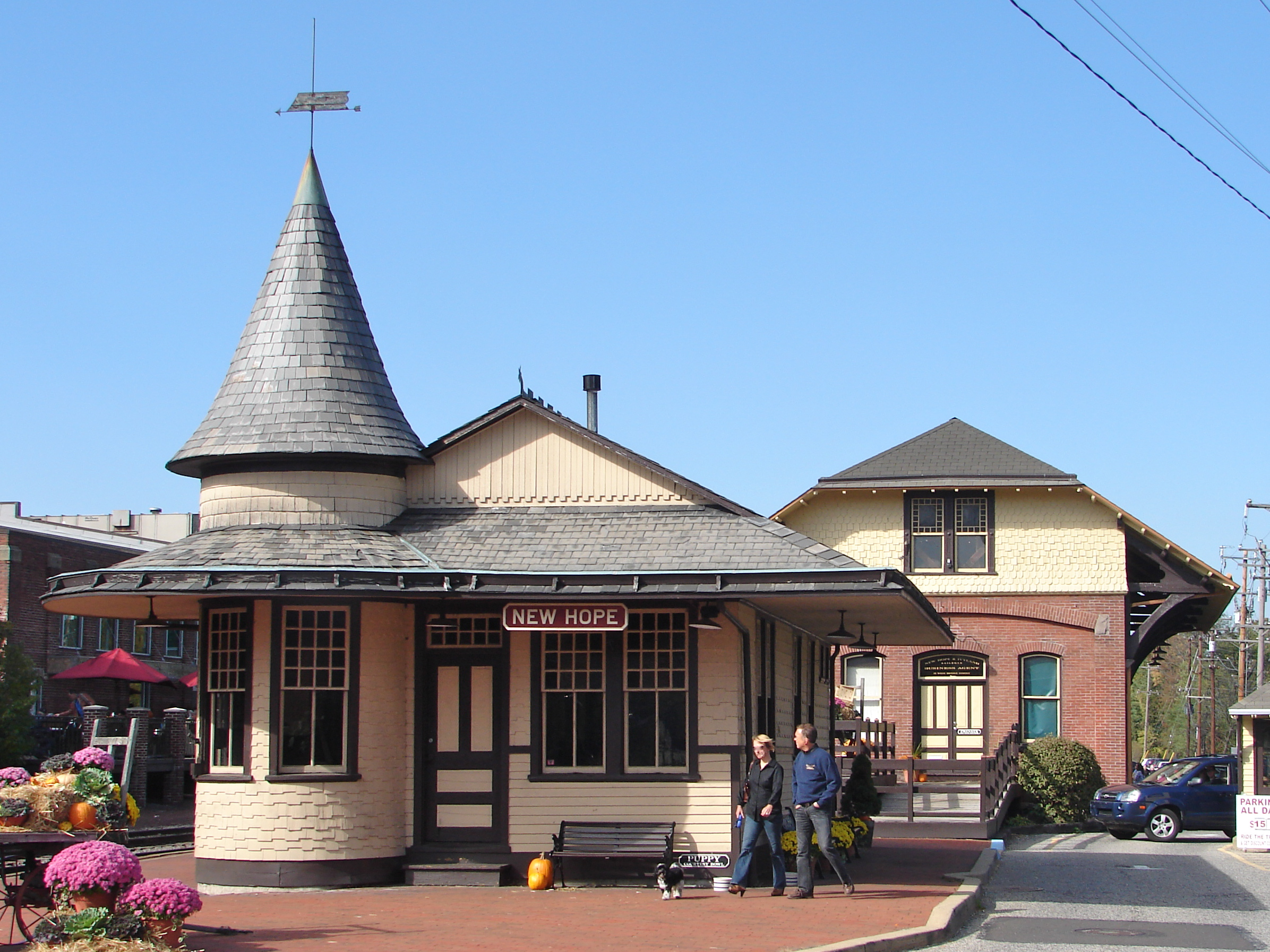
- New Hope station in 2010

General information
- Location: 32 West Bridge Street, New Hope, Pennsylvania, U.S.
- Coordinates: 40°21′54″N 74°57′12″W
- System: New Hope Railroad heritage station
- Platforms: 1

Construction
- Structure type: Depot
- Accessible: yes

Other information
- Station code: NH

History
- Opened: March 21, 1891
- Closed: June 7, 1952
- Rebuilt: 1966, 1991

Services
Preceding station	New Hope Railroad	Following station
Lahaska toward Warminster	Main Line	Terminus
Former services
Preceding station	Reading Railroad	Following station
Hood service ended 1952 toward Philadelphia	New Hope Branch	Terminus
Location

New Hope is a heritage railroad station on the New Hope Railroad in New Hope, Pennsylvania, United States.

== History ==
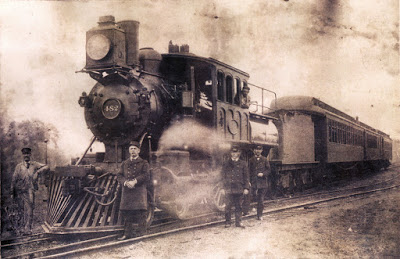
First train to New Hope in March 1891

New Hope station was once the terminal point of the Reading Company's New Hope Branch. Regular service to this station ended September 1952. The station became a heritage railroad station of the NHRR, which was originally known as the New Hope Branch of the Reading Company (RDG), which leased the North Pennsylvania Railroad, of which it was a part. The railroad ran as far as Hartsville Station (near Bristol Road) until March 21, 1891, when the line was extended to the long-desired terminal of New Hope, Pennsylvania.

A decade after June 1952, when Hatboro-New Hope passenger service terminated, the RDG's financial situation was precarious. Looking to rid themselves of unprofitable branch lines via abandonment, a group of train buffs and businessmen led by Philadelphia attorney Kenneth Souser — established as Steam Trains, Inc. — were seeking to operate steam trains on a for-profit basis. Steam Trains, Inc. became organized as the New Hope and Ivyland Railroad, and on June 20, 1966, the 16.7 mile line was sold for $200,000, equal to $1,984,615 today.
