= Warminster Branch =

Railway line in Pennsylvania

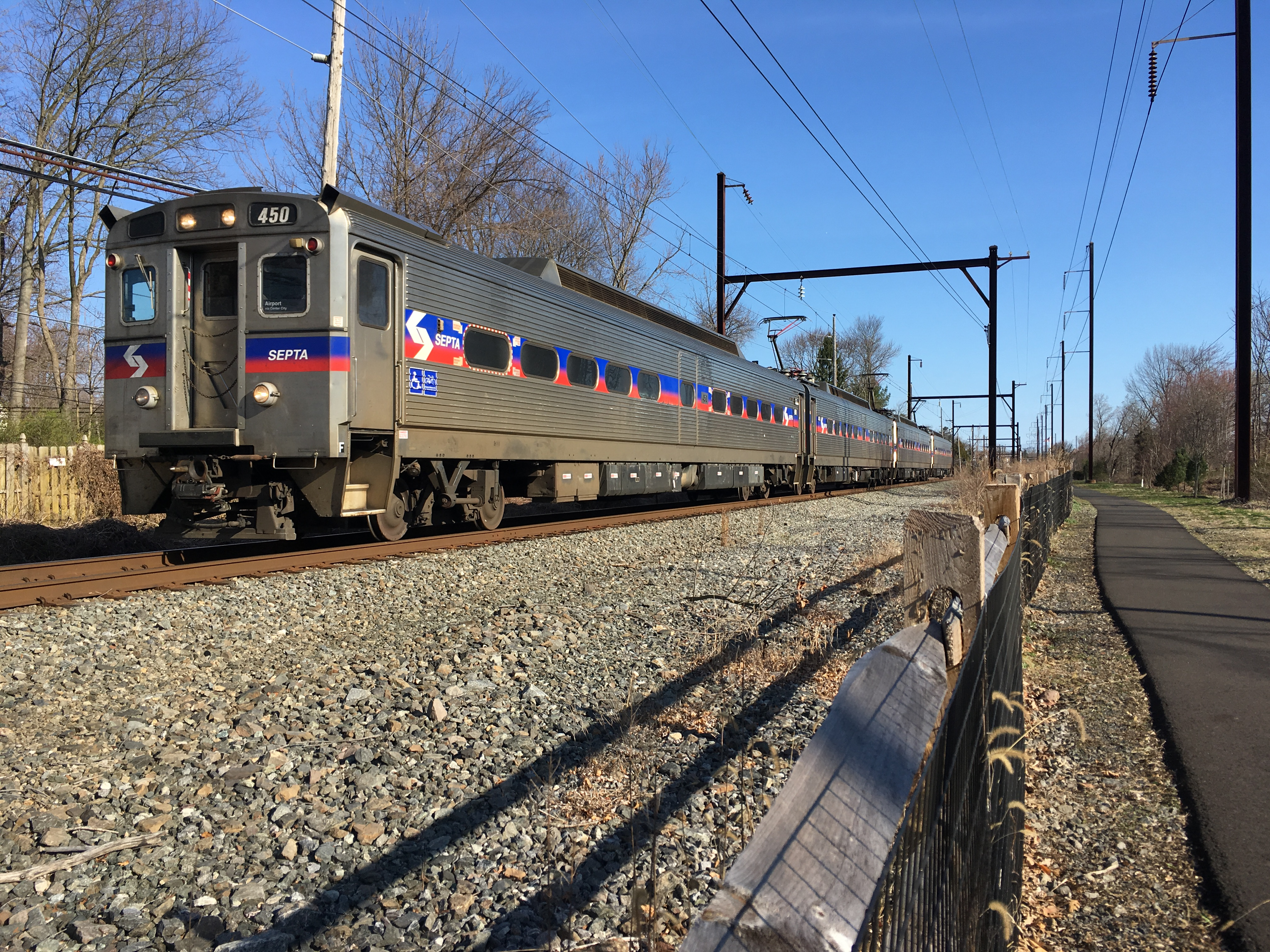
- Southbound Warminster Line train along the Warminster Branch between Hatboro and Willow Grove stations

Overview
- Owner: SEPTA

Service
- Services: Warminster Line

History
- Opened: 18 December 1872

Technical
- Line length: 8.3 mi (13.4 km)
- Track gauge: 1,435 mm (4 ft 8 1/2 in) standard gauge
- Electrification: 12 kV 25 Hz overhead catenary

The Warminster Branch is a railway line in the state of Pennsylvania. It runs 8.3 miles (13.4 km) from a junction with the SEPTA Main Line just north of Glenside to Warminster, where it meets the New Hope Railroad. It was originally built by the North East Pennsylvania Railroad, a subsidiary of the North Pennsylvania Railroad, between 1872 and 1874. It was part of the Reading Company system from 1879 until 1976. Today it is owned by SEPTA and hosts Warminster Line commuter rail service. A later extension of the branch to New Hope, Pennsylvania is now the New Hope Railroad heritage railway.

== History ==
The North East Pennsylvania Railroad was incorporated on December 14, 1870, to build northeast from the North Pennsylvania Railroad's main line at Glenside to Hatboro. The line was completed to the Bucks / Montgomery county line on December 18, 1872, a distance of 7.2 miles (11.6 km). A further 2.44-mile (3.93 km) extension to Hartsville, Pennsylvania, opened on November 9, 1874. The Philadelphia and Reading Railroad leased the North Pennsylvania Railroad on May 14, 1879. Under Reading control, the line was extended to New Hope on March 29, 1891.

Under the Reading the line was known as the New Hope Branch. The Reading electrified the portion between Glenside and Hatboro on July 26, 1931. The North East Pennsylvania Railroad was one of twelve railroads merged into the Reading Company effective December 31, 1945. Passenger service beyond Hatboro ended on June 7, 1952. The New Hope and Ivyland Railroad purchased the section of the branch between Ivyland and New Hope on June 20, 1966, with the intention of running steam excursion service.

The Reading, with SEPTA's support, extended electrification from Hatboro to Warminster on July 29, 1974. With the Reading's final bankruptcy in 1976, the New Hope and Ivyland acquired the section of the New Hope Branch between Ivyland and Warminster, while the Glenside–Warminster section was conveyed to Conrail. Conrail conveyed the line to SEPTA in 1979.
