= North Penn Valley =

Coordinates: 40°14′N 75°17′W

North Penn Valley, Pennsylvania
- Region
- Interactive map of North Penn Valley, Pennsylvania
- Country: United States
- State: Pennsylvania
- County: Montgomery

Population (2010)
  - Total: 97,957
- Time zone: UTC-5 (Eastern (EST))
  - Summer (DST): UTC-4 (EDT)
- Area codes: 215, 267, and 445

The North Penn Valley is a region of Philadelphia suburbs and exurbs in Montgomery County, Pennsylvania. It is somewhat congruent with the North Penn School District. It contains the boroughs of North Wales, Lansdale, and Hatfield, as well as the surrounding townships. The area to its west has traditionally been more rural, while the suburbs to its south and east are, on the whole, more affluent and densely populated.

The North Penn Valley has a total area of 42 square miles (110 km^{2}) and a population of 97,957.

It is included in the greater Philadelphia metropolitan area.

== Etymology ==
The North Penn Valley is named after the North Pennsylvania Railroad, or North Penn Railroad, which was built through the area in the 1850s. The boroughs of North Wales, Lansdale, and Hatfield developed along the North Pennsylvania Railroad line.

== Geography ==
There are seven municipalities in the North Penn Valley. The four townships are Montgomery Township, Hatfield Township, Upper Gwynedd Township, and Towamencin Township. The three boroughs are Lansdale, Hatfield, and North Wales. The North Penn Valley is based around the Borough of Lansdale. Unincorporated communities that are part of the North Penn Valley include Colmar, Kulpsville, Line Lexington, Montgomeryville, and West Point. The North Penn Valley itself is primarily suburban, with urban centers around Lansdale. Most of the land in the valley is developed with suburban housing developments and commercial centers. The population density of the valley is 2,332 per square mile (900/km^{2}).

== Education ==
The North Penn Valley is served by public schools in the North Penn School District which operates North Penn High School, three middle schools, 13 elementary schools, and an alternative education school. The district served about 13,000 students in 2014-2015 and employed about 2,000 staff members. Multiple private schools serve the valley. The Mater Dei School of the Roman Catholic Archdiocese of Philadelphia and the Calvary Baptist School, a pre-K-12th grade Christian school, are in Lansdale. Private high schools in the North Penn Valley include Lansdale Catholic High School in Lansdale and Dock Mennonite Academy in Towamencin Township.

== Transportation ==
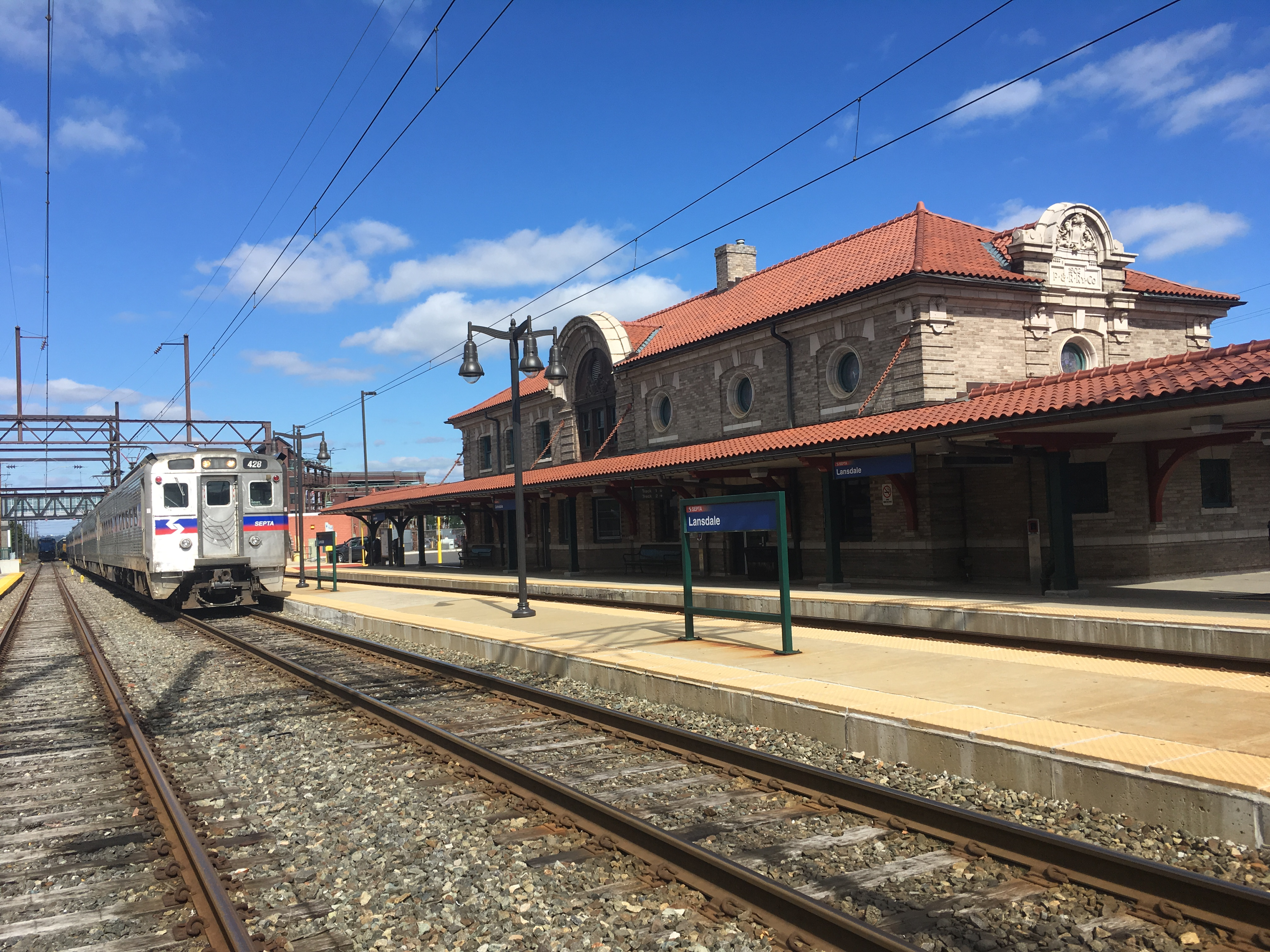
The Lansdale station on SEPTA's Lansdale/Doylestown Line, a major commuter rail station serving the North Penn Valley

The Northeast Extension of the Pennsylvania Turnpike (Interstate 476) has the Lansdale Interchange in Towamencin Township, about three miles (4.8 km) from downtown Lansdale. Major routes serving the North Penn Valley include U.S. Route 202, which passes through Montgomery Township on a parkway alignment, U.S. Route 202 Business, which passes through the commercial center of Montgomery Township, Pennsylvania Route 63, which runs west-east across the valley connecting to the Lansdale Interchange of the Northeast Extension and passing through Lansdale along Main Street, Pennsylvania Route 152, which passes through the eastern corner of Montgomery Township, Pennsylvania Route 309, which runs north-south through commercial areas in Montgomery Township and Hatfield Township along Bethlehem Pike, Pennsylvania Route 363, which begins at PA 63 in Lansdale and heads southwest along Valley Forge Road and Pennsylvania Route 463, which begins at PA 63 in Hatfield Township and heads northeast to Hatfield before turning southeast and passing through Montgomeryville.

SEPTA Regional Rail provides commuter rail service to the North Penn Valley along the Lansdale/Doylestown Line, with stations at North Wales, Pennbrook, Lansdale, 9th Street, Fortuna, Colmar, and Link Belt. The Lansdale/Doylestown Line connects the valley to Center City Philadelphia and Doylestown, along with intermediate points. SEPTA operates three bus routes that serve the North Penn Valley, all of which serve Lansdale and the Montgomery Mall. The Route 94 bus connects the region to the Chestnut Hill section of Philadelphia, the Route 96 bus connects to the Norristown Transportation Center in Norristown, and the Route 132 bus connects to Telford.

Freight rail service in the North Penn Valley is provided by the Pennsylvania Northeastern Railroad, a short-line freight railroad that is headquartered in Lansdale. The Pennsylvania Northeastern Railroad operates the Lansdale Yard in the borough and provides freight rail service out of Lansdale to several points in the northern suburbs of Philadelphia on SEPTA-owned lines. CSX Transportation interchanges with the Pennsylvania Northeastern Railroad in Lansdale.
