= Line Lexington, Pennsylvania =

Unincorporated community in Pennsylvania, US

- Unincorporated community
- Location within Pennsylvania Location within the United States
- Coordinates: 40°17′21″N 75°15′40″W
- Country: United States
- State: Pennsylvania
- County: Bucks and Montgomery
- Township: Hilltown, New Britain, and Hatfield
- Elevation: 387 ft (118 m)
- Time zone: UTC-5 (Eastern (EST))
  - Summer (DST): UTC-4 (EDT)
- ZIP code: 18932
- Area codes: 215, 267 and 445
- GNIS feature ID: 1179418

Line Lexington is an unincorporated community located in the Philadelphia metropolitan area on Route 309 in Bucks and Montgomery counties in Pennsylvania, United States. It is split between the Bucks County townships of Hilltown and New Britain and the Montgomery County township of Hatfield. The Montgomery County portion of the village is in the North Penn School District and is part of the North Penn Valley region that is centered on the borough of Lansdale. The Bucks County portion is also served by the North Penn School District. While it has its own post office with the ZIP code of 18932, portions use the Colmar ZIP code of 18915, the Chalfont ZIP code of 18914 or the Hatfield ZIP code of 19440. It is served by SEPTA Suburban Bus Route 132 and the nearest SEPTA Regional Rail stations are nearby in Colmar and Chalfont on the Lansdale/Doylestown Line. The Line Lexington telephone exchange uses area code 215.
