= Link Belt station =

Railway station in Colmar, Pennsylvania

Link Belt
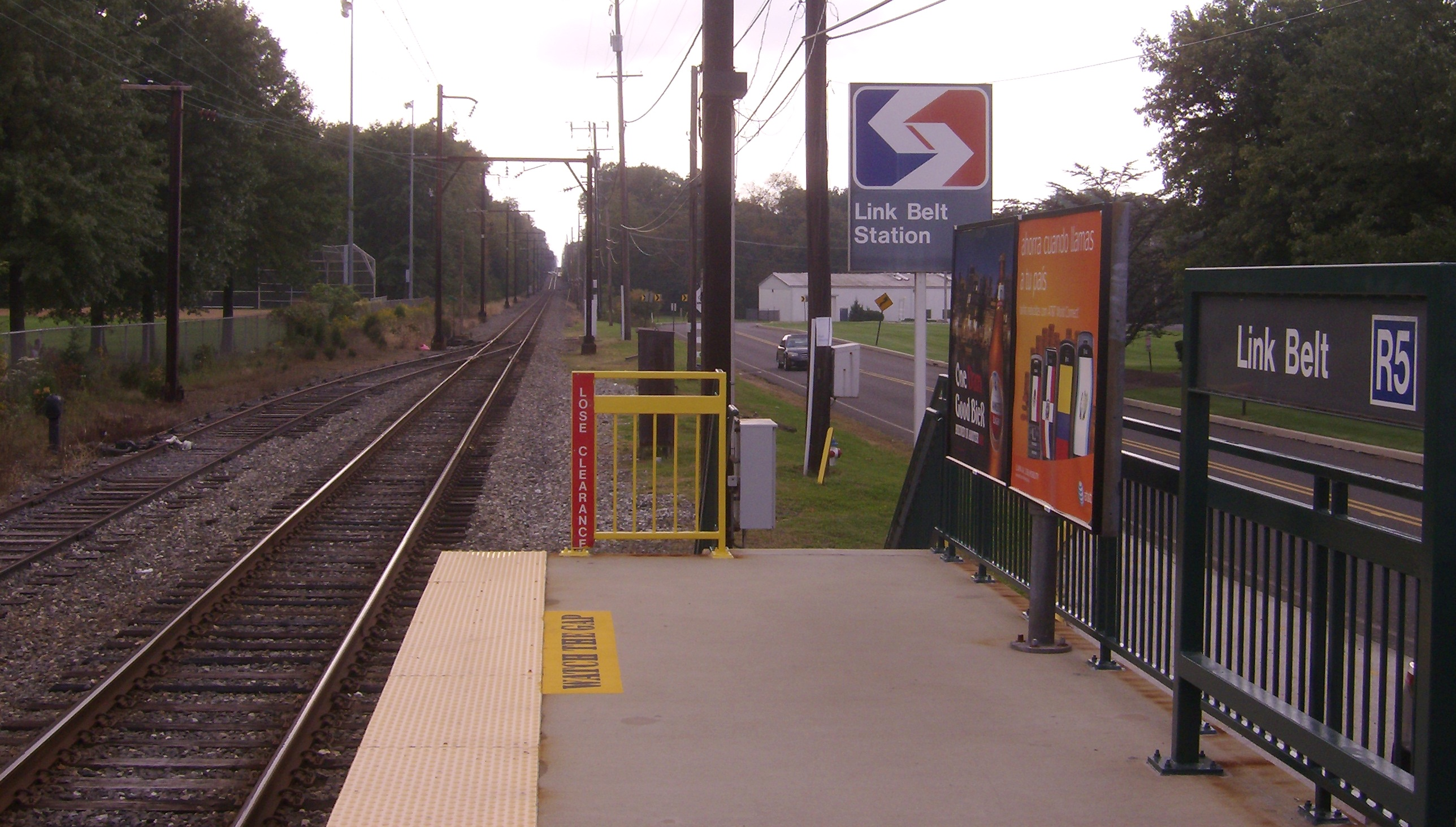

General information
- Location: 3367 East Walnut Street; Colmar, Pennsylvania, USA
- Coordinates: 40.274°N 75.247°W
- Owner: SEPTA
- Platforms: 1 side platform
- Tracks: 1 (and one storage track)

Construction
- Parking: None
- Accessible: Yes

Other information
- Fare zone: 4

History
- Opened: December 2, 1952

Passengers
- 2017: 23 boardings, 20 alightings (weekday average)
- Rank: 146 of 146

Services
Preceding station	SEPTA	Following station
Colmar toward Penn Medicine Station	Lansdale/Doylestown Line	Chalfont toward Doylestown
Location

Link Belt station is a station stop on the SEPTA Lansdale/Doylestown Line. It is located at East Walnut Street and County Line Road in Colmar, Pennsylvania and just northwest of Montgomeryville. It is located on the Montgomery County side of County Line Road, north of Bethlehem Pike (PA 309), and sits next to the popular "Whistle Stop Park."

== Background ==
In FY 2017, the Link Belt station had a weekday average of 23 boardings and 20 alightings, making it the least used station in the SEPTA Regional Rail system.

The Link Belt station was created by the Reading Railroad to service the Link-Belt Company plant built across East Walnut Street from the rail line in 1952, opening formally on December 2. Link-Belt stopped operations in Colmar in 1983 and the former plant is now the headquarters of Dorman Products.

On December 18, 2011, weekend service was discontinued at this station due to low ridership.
