= Chalfont station =

Railway station in Chalfont, Pennsylvania

Chalfont
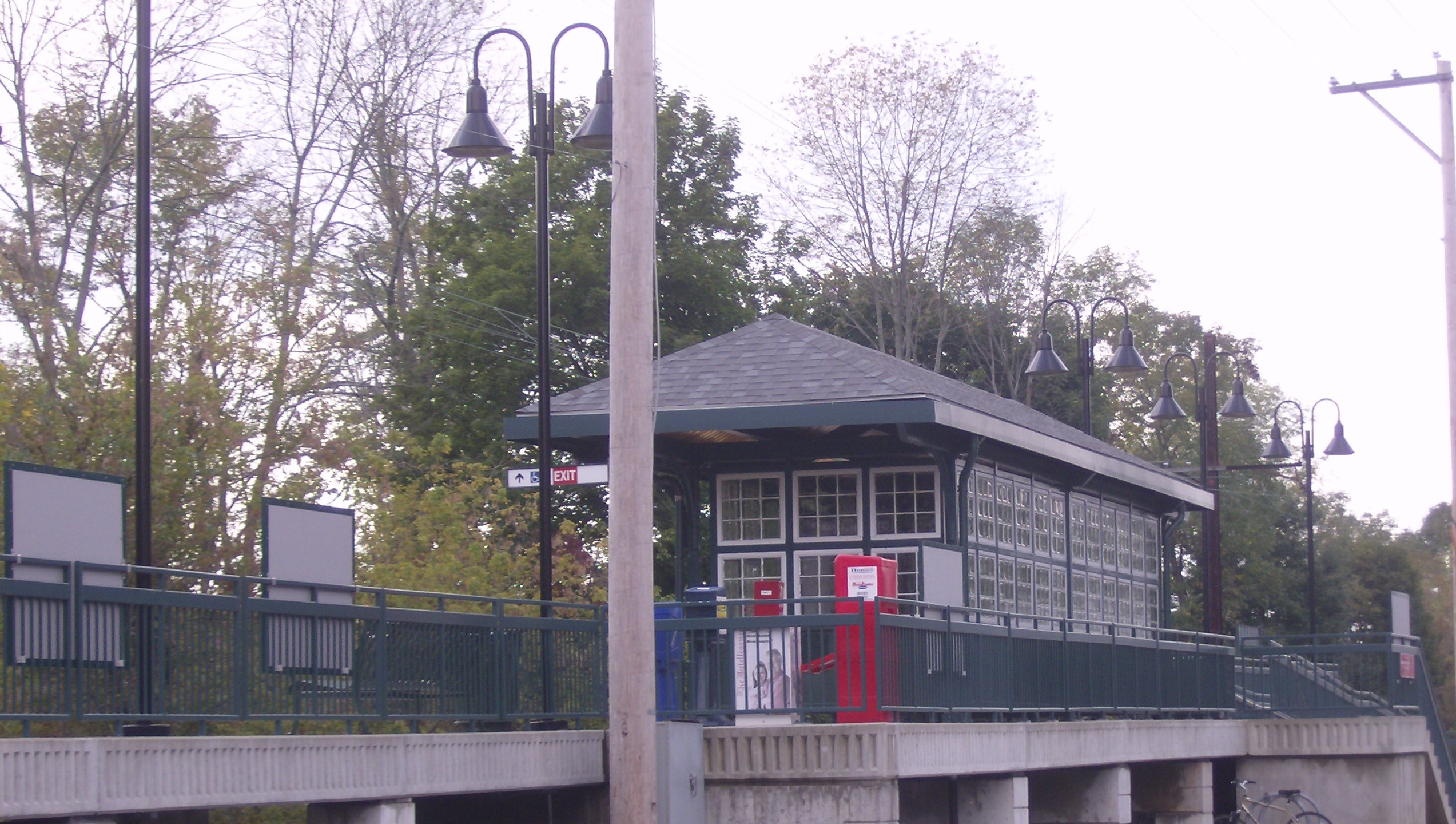

General information
- Location: 13 Sunset Avenue; Chalfont, Pennsylvania, USA
- Coordinates: 40.288°N 75.209°W
- Owner: SEPTA
- Platforms: 1 side platform
- Tracks: 1
- Connections: BCT: DART West

Construction
- Parking: 56 free/48 with permits
- Cycle facilities: Yes
- Accessible: Yes

Other information
- Fare zone: 4

History
- Electrified: July 26, 1931

Key dates
- September 16, 1909: Station depot burned

Services
Preceding station	SEPTA	Following station
Link Belt toward Penn Medicine Station	Lansdale/Doylestown Line	New Britain toward Doylestown
Colmar toward Penn Medicine Station	Lansdale/Doylestown Line (weekends and major holidays)	New Britain toward Doylestown
Former services
Preceding station	Reading Railroad	Following station
Colmar toward Lansdale	Doylestown Branch	New Britain toward Doylestown
Location

Chalfont station is a SEPTA Regional Rail station in Chalfont, Pennsylvania. Located at Sunset Avenue and Main Street, it serves the Lansdale/Doylestown Line. In FY 2013, Chalfont station had a weekday average of 136 boardings and 143 alightings. The station has a small shelter with overhead heat lamps that can be activated in the winter.
