= 9th Street station (SEPTA) =

Railway station in Lansdale, Pennsylvania

9th Street
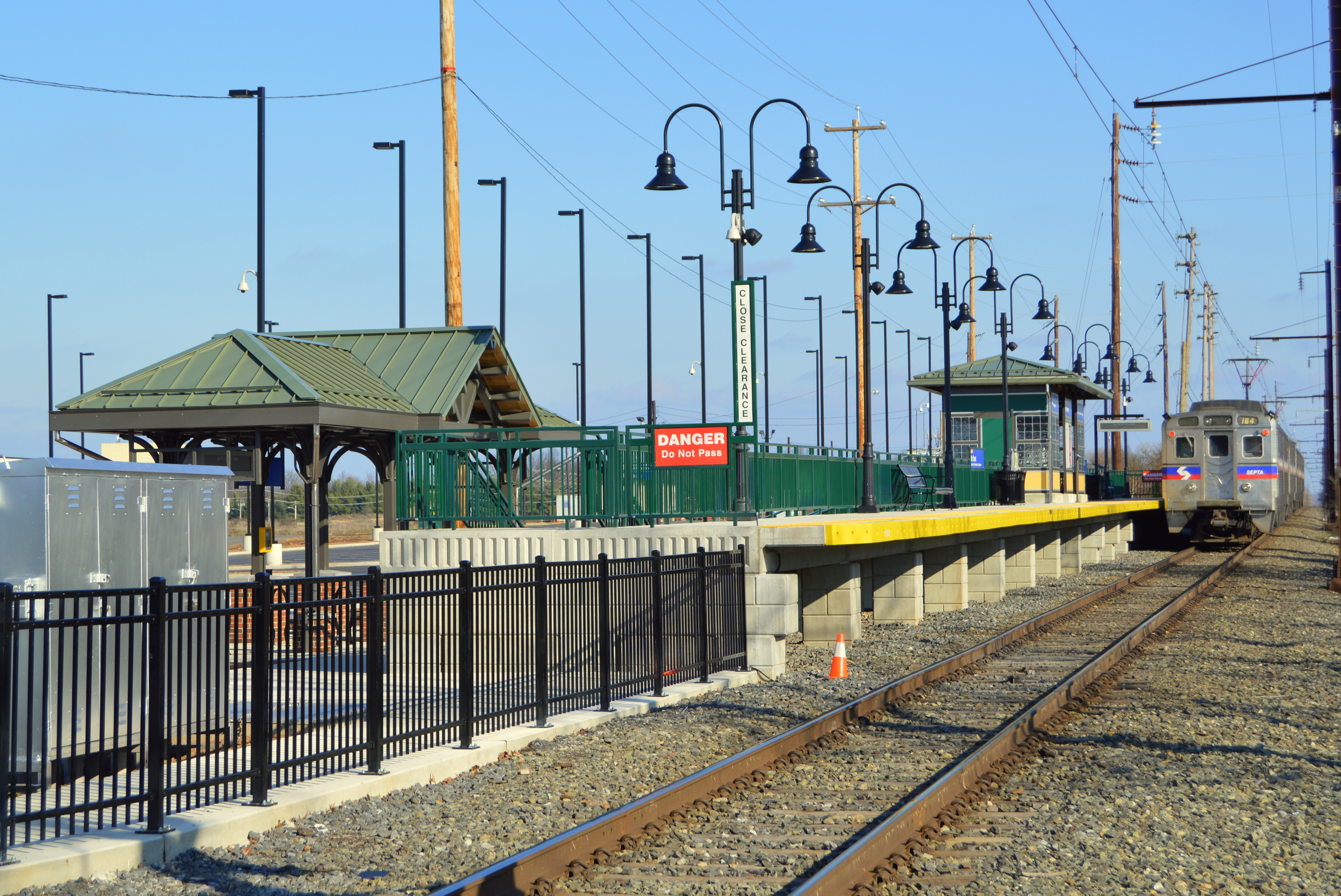
- 9th Street station platform in January 2016

General information
- Location: 141 West 9th Street; Lansdale, Pennsylvania
- Coordinates: 40.2523°N 75.2756°W
- Owner: SEPTA
- Platforms: 1 side platform
- Tracks: 1

Construction
- Parking: 78 permanent spaces 125 temporary spaces 4 handicapped spaces
- Accessible: yes

Other information
- Fare zone: 4

History
- Opened: November 15, 2015

Services
Preceding station	SEPTA	Following station
Lansdale toward Penn Medicine Station	Lansdale/Doylestown Line	Fortuna toward Doylestown
Location

9th Street station is a passenger rail station on the SEPTA Regional Rail Lansdale/Doylestown Line, located at 9th Street near Shaw Avenue in Lansdale, Pennsylvania. It was opened to serve as an alternate parking location during the construction of a garage at nearby Lansdale station, but will remain open after. 9th Street station has a permanent parking lot plus a temporary lot for use during the garage construction period. It opened on November 15, 2015.

== Station design ==
The station is designed similarly to spartan Colmar station, two stops north. It has a 256-foot (78 m)-long high-level platform which provides level boarding for handicapped passengers. The platform was made of pre-cast concrete sections to speed construction. It can be lengthened in the future if demand warrants.

The station has a 78-space permanent lot plus a 125-space temporary lot, as well as a storage area for bicycles. Four retention ponds filter stormwater runoff from the parking lots to avoid polluting groundwater. The total cost of the station and parking lots was expected to be $3.8 million.

== History ==
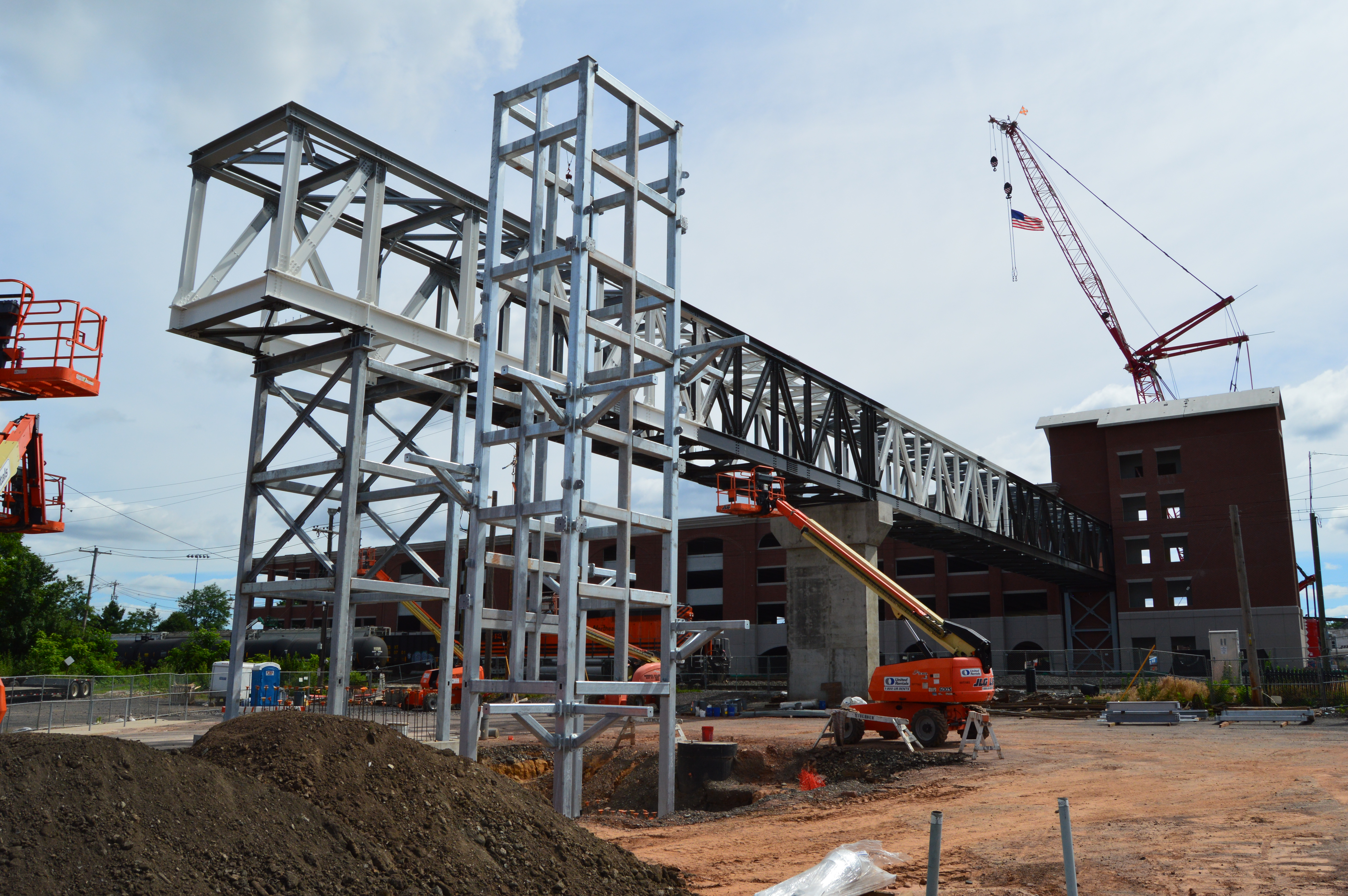
Construction of the parking garage at Lansdale station in July 2016. 9th Street station was opened to provide alternate parking capacity during the garage construction.

Around 2007, a development agreement for the former American Olean Tile Company factory established space for a future train station at 9th Street in northeast Lansdale, Pennsylvania to support transit-oriented development at the factory site. However, no funds were available to construct the station.

In May 2014, consideration of a 9th Street station resumed after design funding became available for a parking garage at Lansdale station, a major park-and-ride site. 400 of the 497 spaces at Lansdale would be unavailable during construction of the garage, necessitating an increase in parking at other locations. Over the next months, SEPTA began planning a small station at the site using internal staff, intending to create a small and inexpensive station that could be in place for the garage construction but remain afterwards to serve the redevelopment. Plans were completed in December 2014. The Lansdale Borough council approved the plans later that month, clearing the way for construction beginning in the spring.

Site clearing began in March 2015. Construction proceeded over the summer and was largely complete by September. The borough traded the land for the parking lots to its parking authority in August 2015 in exchange for funding to extend 9th Street across the tracks to continue the street grid.

The station opened on November 15, 2015, with a ribbon-cutting ceremony scheduled for the next day. It was the first new station added to the SEPTA system since Thorndale in 1999.
