= Colmar station (SEPTA) =

Rail station in Colmar, Pennsylvania, US

Colmar
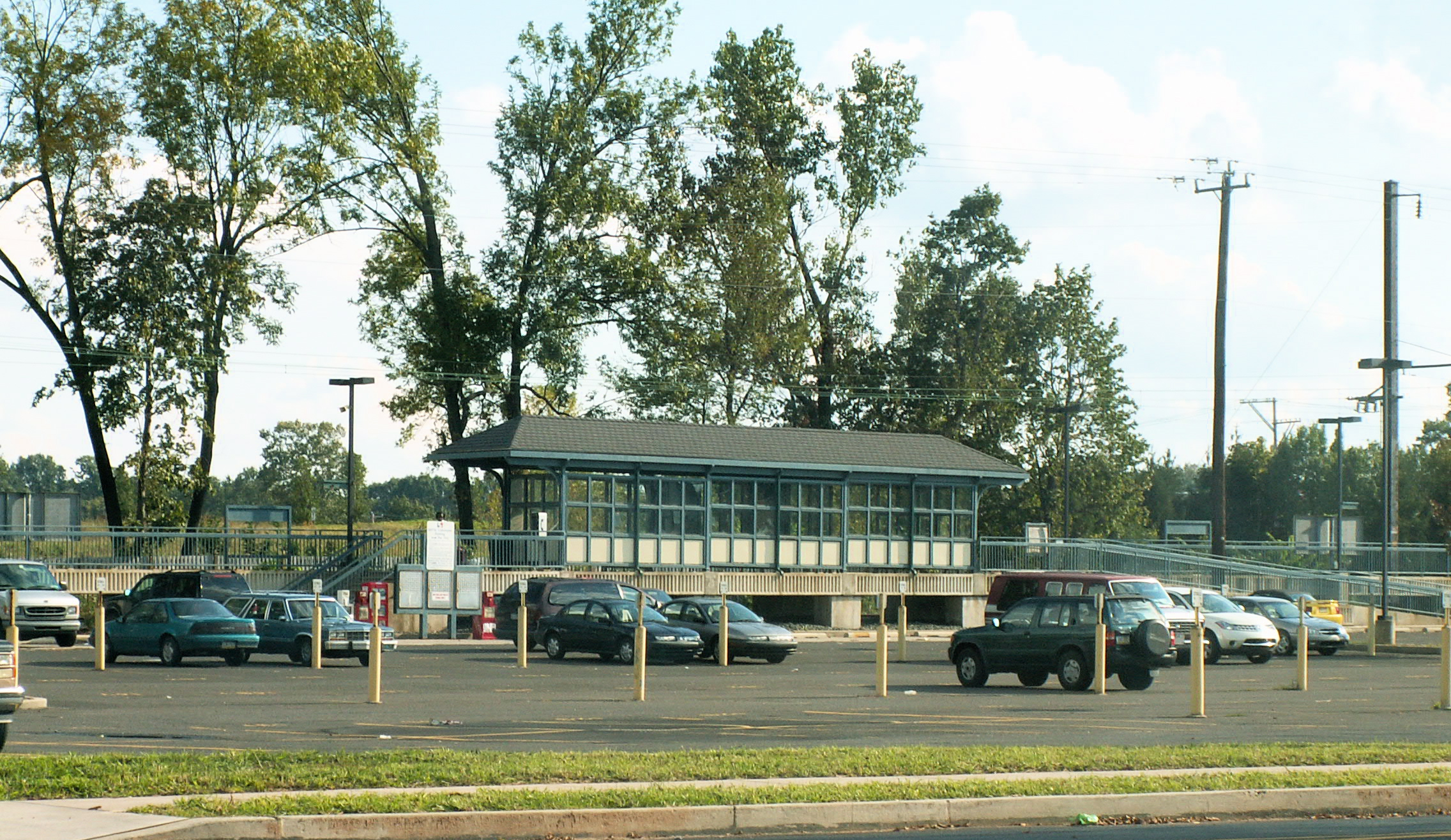

General information
- Location: Bethlehem Pike & Walnut Street; Colmar, Pennsylvania, USA
- Coordinates: 40.2684°N 75.2542°W
- Owner: SEPTA
- Platforms: 1 side platform
- Tracks: 1

Construction
- Parking: 288
- Accessible: Yes

Other information
- Fare zone: 4

History
- Opened: 1856
- Electrified: July 26, 1931
- Former names: Line Lexington (1856–1871)

Passengers
- 2017: 494 boardings 328 alightings (weekday average)
- Rank: 52 of 146

Services
Preceding station	SEPTA	Following station
Fortuna toward Penn Medicine Station	Lansdale/Doylestown Line	Link Belt toward Doylestown
Fortuna toward Penn Medicine Station	Lansdale/Doylestown Line (weekends and major holidays)	Chalfont toward Doylestown
Former services
Preceding station	Reading Railroad	Following station
Fortuna toward Lansdale	Doylestown Branch	Chalfont toward Doylestown
Location

Colmar station is a SEPTA Regional Rail station in Colmar, Pennsylvania. Located at Bethlehem Pike (PA 309) and Walnut Street, it serves the Lansdale/Doylestown Line. In FY 2013, Colmar station had a weekday average of 370 boardings and 369 alightings.

Colmar station was originally built in 1856 by the North Pennsylvania Railroad as Line Lexington station, despite being located 1½ miles away from the Village of Line Lexington. In January 1871 a new post office near the station named the surrounding community "Jenkins" and was renamed "Ainsworth" in June of that year, but neither had any effect on the name of the station until two weeks later, when both the village and the station were named "Colmar," which has remained the name of the station ever since.
