= Dorman Products =

American company

Dorman Products Inc.
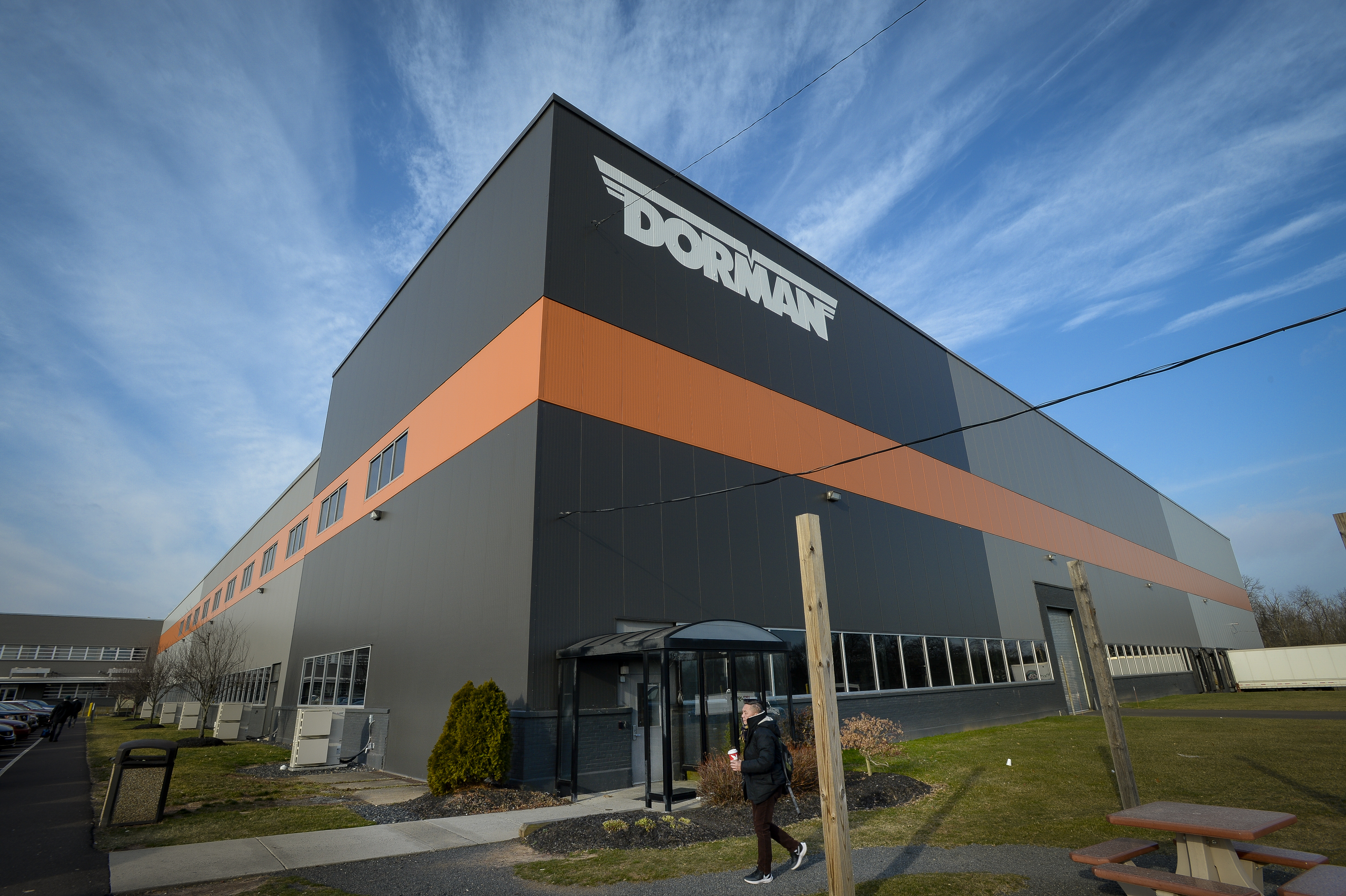
- Exterior photo of Dorman Products headquarters in Colmar, Pennsylvania
- Type: Public company
- Traded as: Nasdaq: DORM
- Industry: Automotive
- Founded: 1918; 108 years ago
- Headquarters: Colmar, Pennsylvania, United States
- Area served: United States
- Products: Auto parts
- Revenue: ▲US$2.13 billion (2025)
- Net income: ▲US$204 million (2025)
- Website: www.dormanproducts.com

Dorman Products is an American manufacturer of aftermarket automotive products in the United States. The company was founded in 1918. The company trades on the NASDAQ under the ticker DORM. The company is headquartered in Colmar, Pennsylvania.

Dorman focuses on identifying parts that are frequently failing on cars, trucks and other motor vehicles in operation and developing repair and replacement products.

The company announced record sales in 2022. In August 2022, the company began the purchase of SuperATV for $590 million in total value. In June 2021, Dorman entered into an agreement to acquire Dayton Parts for $338 million.
