= North Wales station =

Railway station in North Wales, Pennsylvania

North Wales
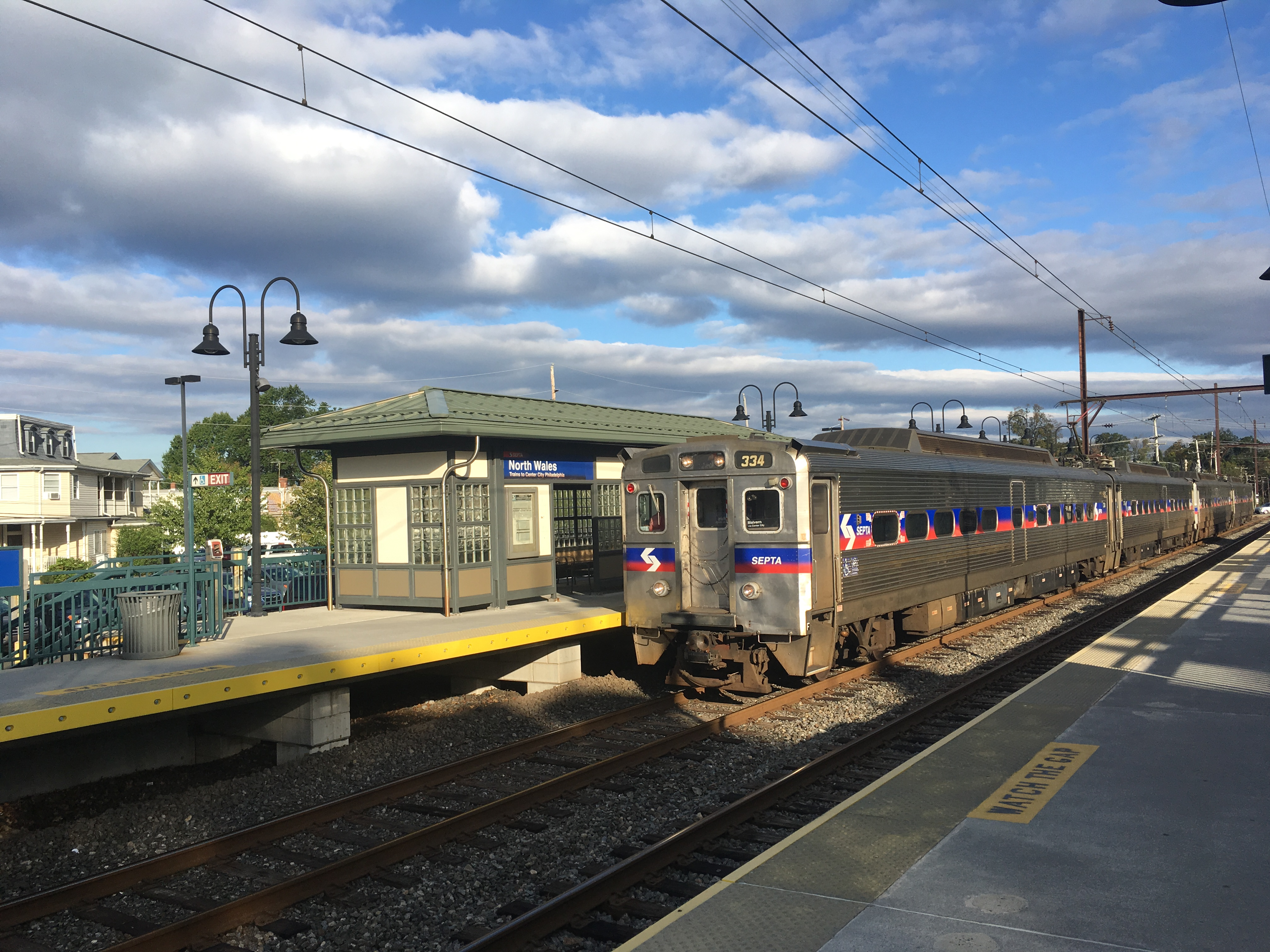
- Inbound train at North Wales station in October 2018

General information
- Location: Beaver Street, North Wales, Pennsylvania, U.S.
- Coordinates: 40.2128°N 75.2767°W
- Owner: SEPTA
- Line: SEPTA Main Line
- Platforms: 2 side platforms
- Tracks: 2
- Connections: SEPTA Suburban Bus: 96

Construction
- Platform levels: 1
- Parking: 167 spaces
- Accessible: Yes

Other information
- Fare zone: 4

History
- Opened: 1873
- Rebuilt: 2008
- Electrified: July 26, 1931

Passengers
- 2017: 974 boardings 855 alightings (weekday average)
- Rank: 17 of 146

Services
Preceding station	SEPTA	Following station
Gwynedd Valley toward Penn Medicine Station	Lansdale/Doylestown Line	Pennbrook toward Doylestown
Former services
Preceding station	Reading Railroad	Following station
Gwynedd Valley toward Philadelphia	Bethlehem Branch	Pennbrook toward Bethlehem
Location

North Wales station is a station along the SEPTA Lansdale/Doylestown Line located at Beaver and School Streets in North Wales, Pennsylvania. In FY 2017, North Wales station had a weekday average of 974 boardings and 855 alightings. The station includes a 167-space parking lot. Parking is available on both sides of the tracks between Beaver Street and Walnut Street, which includes an entrance at Walnut and 5th Streets. The east parking lot runs between the tracks and 6th Street/Railroad Street. School Street runs through the west parking lot, and then turns southwest while that parking lot continues to follow the tracks, almost reaching Walnut Street.

North Wales station was originally built in 1873 by the Reading Railroad, and previously contained a cupola over the ticket window, iron support under the overhanging roof, and a matching shelter on the opposite side of the tracks.

In the early 2000s, the station was reconstructed to make it ADA accessible by building long elevated platforms and three new shelters—one on the outbound side and two on the inbound side. The station was under construction from August 2007 until January 2009. After the platform project, the original station was moved 2500 feet from its previous location, the cupola was removed, and the support beams were replaced with wood.

== Station layout ==
North Wales has two high-level side platforms.

== Gallery ==
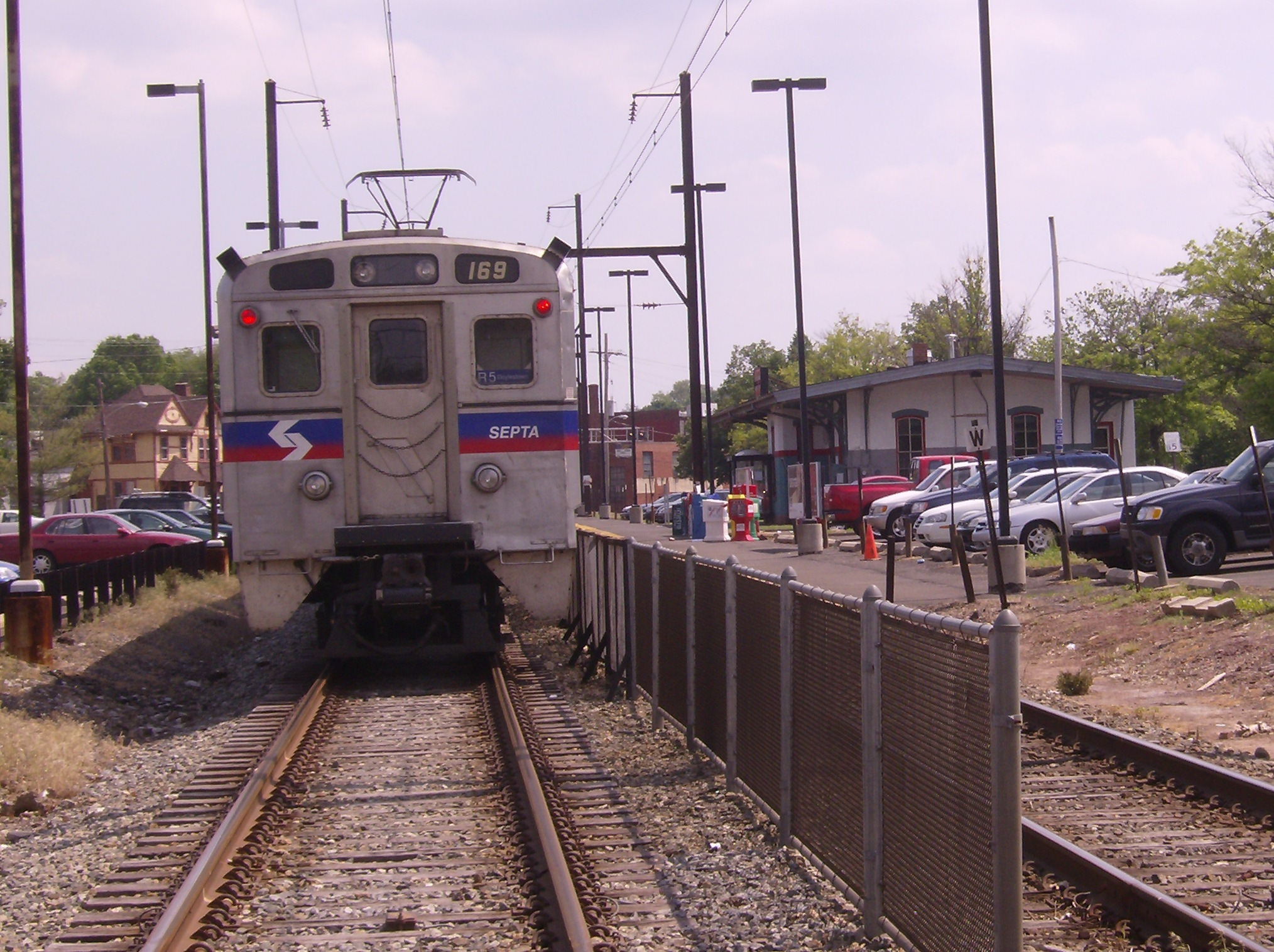
North Wales station before the platform project

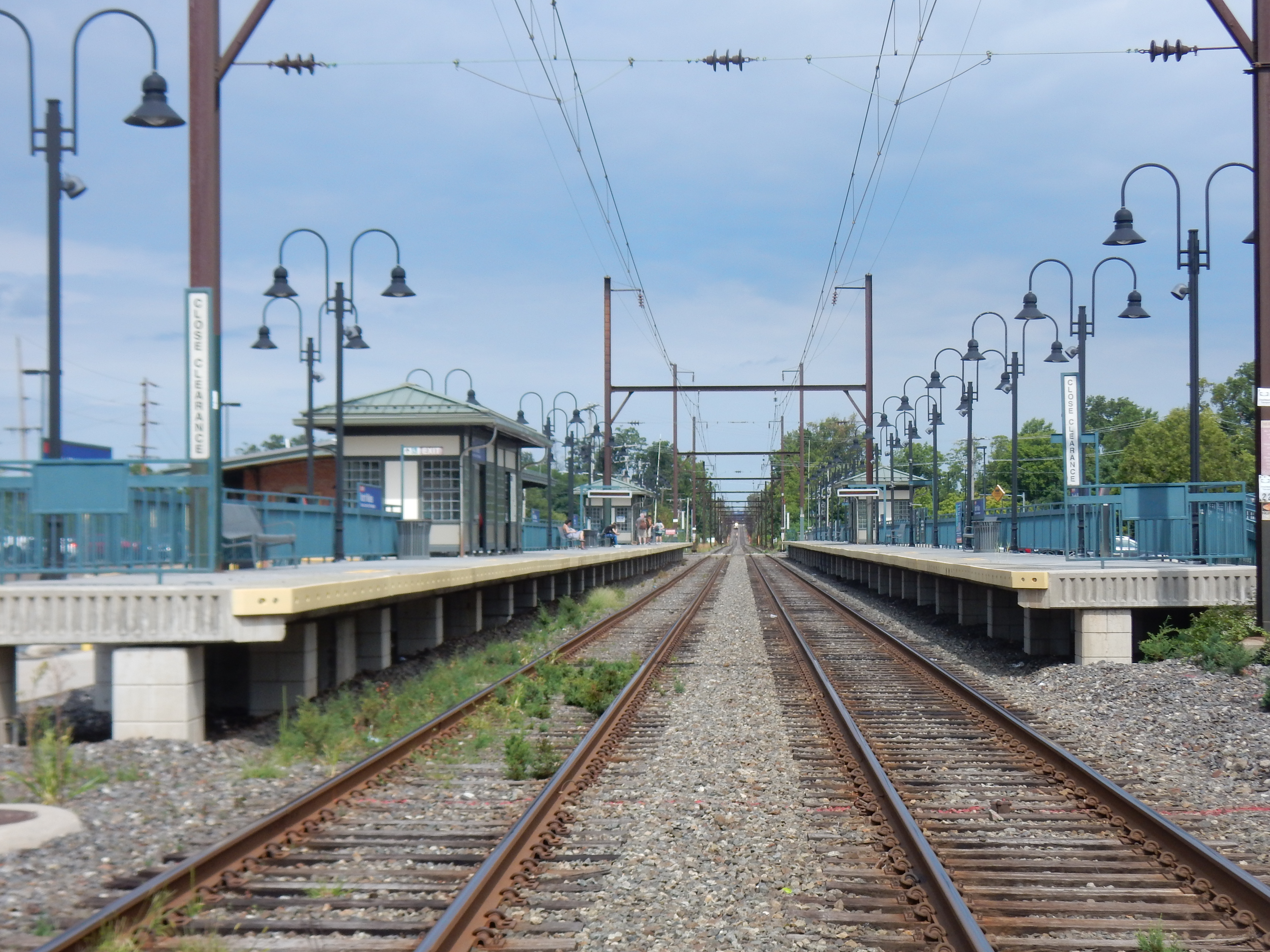
North Wales after the platform project
