= Fortuna station (SEPTA) =

Railway station in Pennsylvania, US

Fortuna
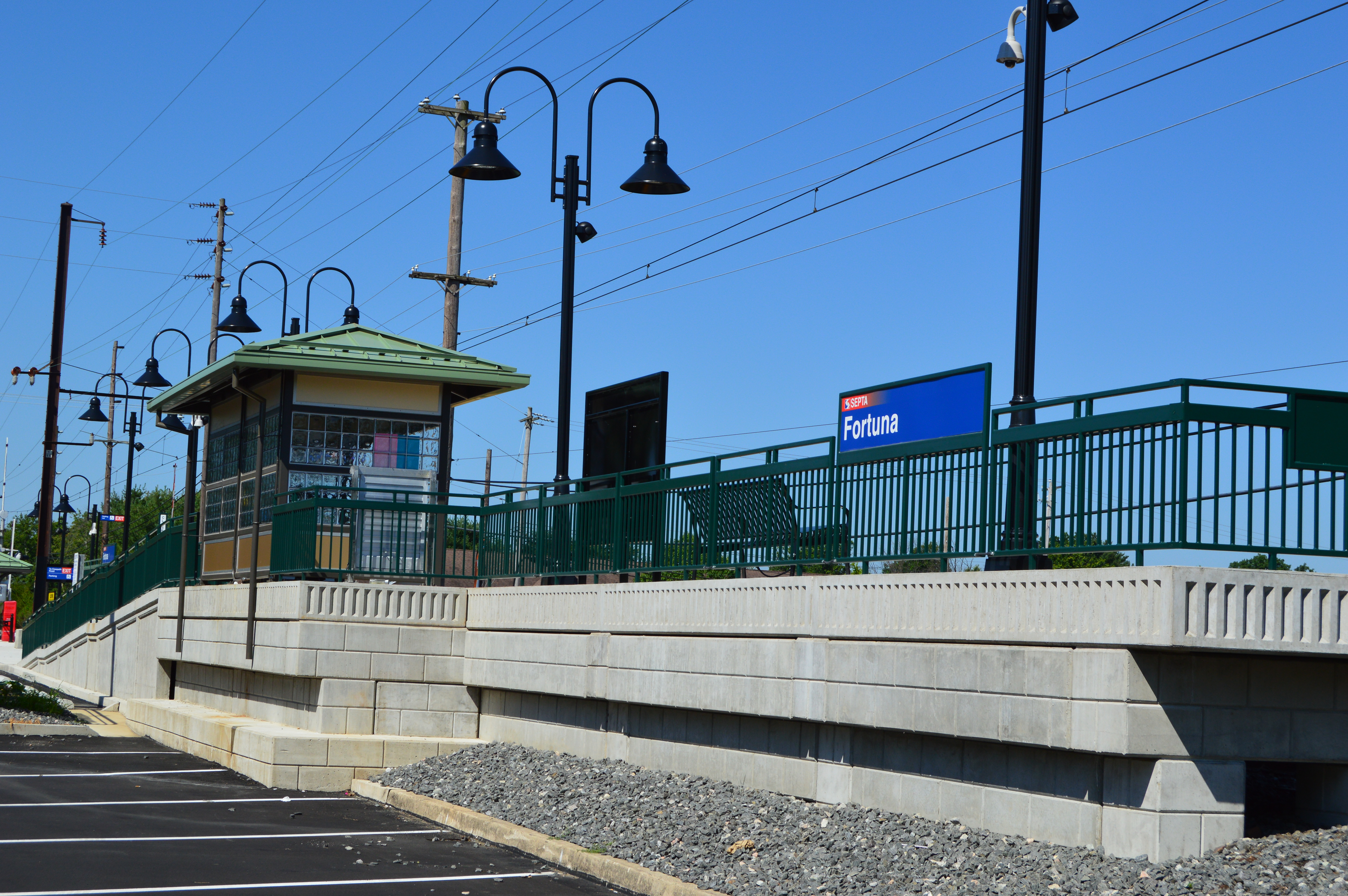
- Newly-constructed high level platform in 2017

General information
- Location: 101 Cowpath Road (PA 463); Lansdale, Pennsylvania 19446
- Coordinates: 40.2523°N 75.2756°W
- Owner: SEPTA
- Platforms: 1 side platform
- Tracks: 1
- Connections: SEPTA Suburban Bus: 132

Construction
- Parking: 33
- Accessible: Yes

Other information
- Fare zone: 4

History
- Electrified: July 26, 1931

Services
Preceding station	SEPTA	Following station
9th Street toward Penn Medicine Station	Lansdale/Doylestown Line	Colmar toward Doylestown
Former services
Preceding station	Reading Railroad	Following station
Lansdale Terminus	Doylestown Branch	Colmar toward Doylestown
Location

Fortuna station is a station along the SEPTA Lansdale/Doylestown Line. It is located near the corner of North Broad Street and Cowpath Road (Route 463) in Hatfield Township, Pennsylvania, United States. Cowpath Road was originally an actual cow path. In FY 2013, Fortuna station had a weekday average of 60 boardings and 103 alightings. As part of an out of court settlement with the owners of a cow killed by a Reading Railroad train at the crossing, the station was named Fortuna in honor of the deceased cow.
