= Pennbrook station =

Railway station in Lansdale, Pennsylvania

Pennbrook
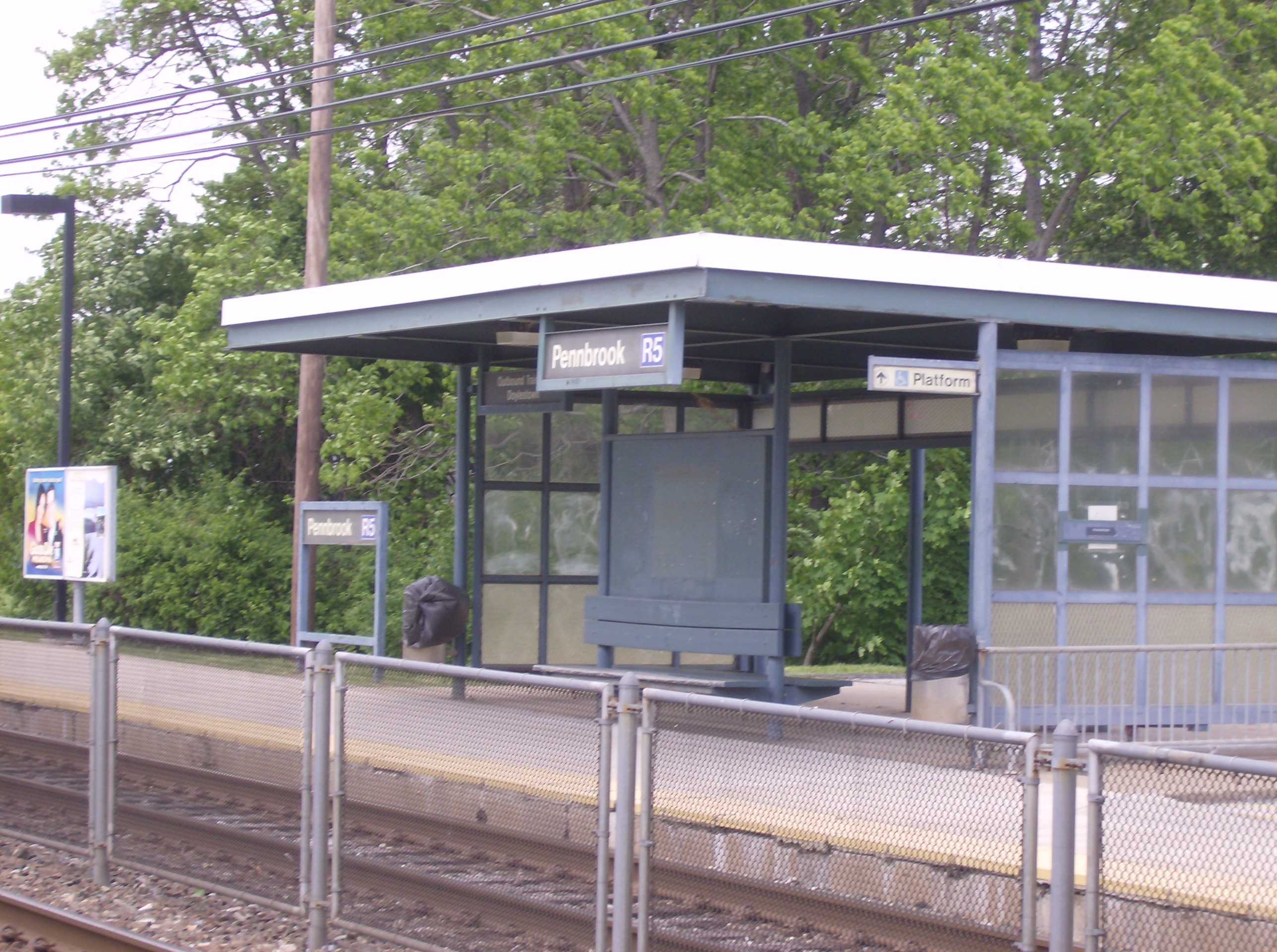

General information
- Location: 1114 Church Road; Lansdale, Pennsylvania 19446, USA
- Coordinates: 40.230152°N 75.281662°W
- Owner: SEPTA
- Line: SEPTA Main Line
- Platforms: 2 side platforms
- Tracks: 2
- Connections: SEPTA Suburban Bus: 94

Construction
- Structure type: Open acrylic glass shelters
- Parking: 222
- Accessible: Yes

Other information
- Fare zone: 4

History
- Electrified: July 26, 1931

Passengers
- 2017: 615 boardings 568 alightings (weekday average)
- Rank: 37 of 146

Services
Preceding station	SEPTA	Following station
North Wales toward Penn Medicine Station	Lansdale/Doylestown Line	Lansdale toward Doylestown
Former services
Preceding station	Reading Railroad	Following station
North Wales toward Philadelphia	Bethlehem Branch	Lansdale toward Bethlehem
Location

Pennbrook station is a station along the SEPTA Lansdale/Doylestown Line, north of Philadelphia, Pennsylvania, United States. In FY 2013, Pennbrook station had a weekday average of 467 boardings and 371 alightings.

The station is located at Church Road and Cherry Street in the Pennbrook section of the borough of Lansdale and features a 222 space parking lot. Most of these parking spaces are located on the east side of Church Road and are on Borough of Lansdale property. The lots on the west side of Church Road are on SEPTA property. Overnight parking is allowed by prior arrangement on the SEPTA lots. It is not allowed on the Lansdale lots. This station consists of two acrylic glass shelters on both platforms.

== Station layout ==
Pennbrook has two low-level side platforms with a mini high-level platform.
