= Bucks County Transport =

- Headquarters: Holicong, Pennsylvania
- Service area: Bucks County, Pennsylvania
- Service type: Bus
- Alliance: Operates TMA Bucks Rushbus service
- Website: https://www.bctransport.org

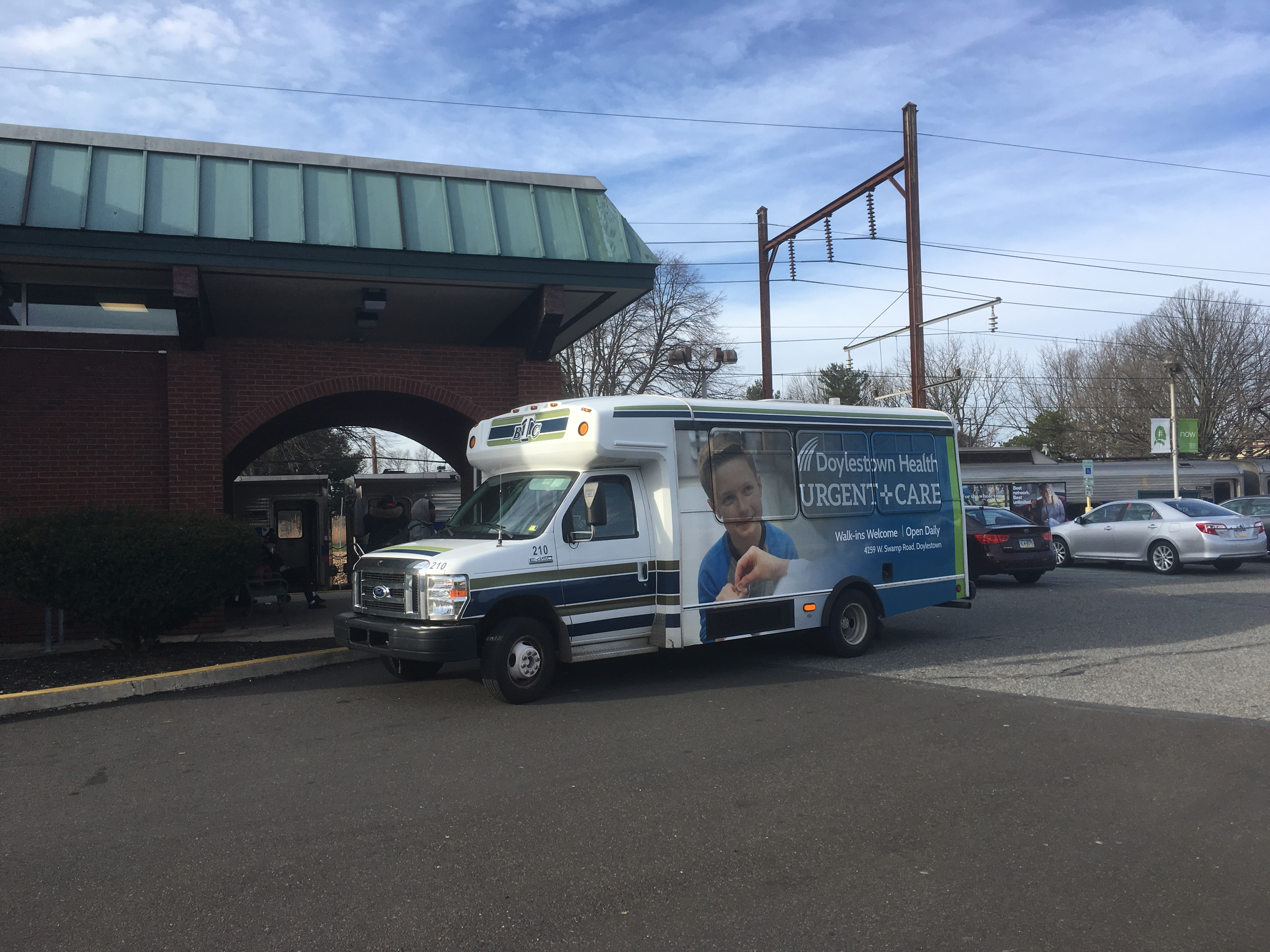
Bucks County Transport-operated Rushbus at Warminster station

Bucks County Transport (BCT) is a private, non-profit organization that operates transportation services in Bucks County, Pennsylvania. Bucks County Transport is headquartered in Holicong, Pennsylvania, and operates bus services throughout Bucks County. The organization currently operates a shared ride program, four DART bus lines, and provides discounted transportation for participants of the Medical Assistance Transportation Program (MATP) and for disabled persons. In addition, Bucks County Transport operates TMA Bucks' Rushbus services.

== Services ==
- Shared Ride Program
  - Registered parties are able to schedule transportation with Bucks County Transport. Service is provided on a first-come, first-served basis and transportation must be scheduled at least two days in advance.
- DART Bus Lines
  - Doylestown DART
  - DART West
  - DART South
  - DART East
- Bucks County Courthouse Shuttle
- Medical Assistance Transportation
  - Free transportation is provided for MATP consumers to all health care services that are covered by MATP.
- Persons with Disabilities Program
  - Bucks County residents between the ages of 18 and 64 that can provide written verification of a disability are eligible for a discounted rate.
- Rushbus
  - Bucks County Transport is responsible for operating the TMA Bucks Rushbus service, which connect employers to SEPTA train and bus service. There are two Rushbus lines: the Bristol Rushbus and the Richboro-Warminster Rushbus.

== DART ==
Bucks County Transit operates four bus lines under the DART brand. The lines are located within the Doylestown, New Britain, Chalfont, Warrington, and Warminster areas. No bus service is operated by BCT on Sundays or holidays. The DART routes have a fare of $1.00, with senior citizens allowed to ride for free.

=== Doylestown DART ===
Doylestown DART is a bus service in Doylestown that runs Monday through Saturday, connecting the Cross Keys Shopping Center with Neshaminy Manor. The bus service has stops serving residential and commercial areas, government offices, schools, shopping centers, and Doylestown Hospital. The Doylestown DART provides connections to SEPTA Regional Rail's Lansdale/Doylestown Line and SEPTA's Route 55 bus.

=== DART West ===
DART West bus service connects Delaware Valley University and Doylestown DART with the central Bucks County boroughs of New Britain and Chalfont. The line serves as a connection between the DART system and SEPTA Regional Rail's Lansdale/Doylestown Line. It started operating on January 6, 2020, with service only running from Monday-Friday.

=== DART South ===
DART South bus service runs along the Pennsylvania Route 611 corridor in Warrington, serving residential and commercial areas. The bus connects with the Doylestown DART at the Doylestown Point Shopping Center. Service along the DART South operates Monday-Friday.

=== DART East ===
DART East bus service runs along the Pennsylvania Route 132 corridor in Warminster, serving residential and commercial areas and connecting to the Warminster station serving SEPTA Regional Rail's Warminster Line. Service along the DART East operates Monday-Friday.

== Buses ==
Bucks County Transport uses a fleet of natural gas burning buses.
