= Lansdale/Doylestown Line =

SEPTA Regional Rail service

Coordinates: 40.24305°N 75.28537°W

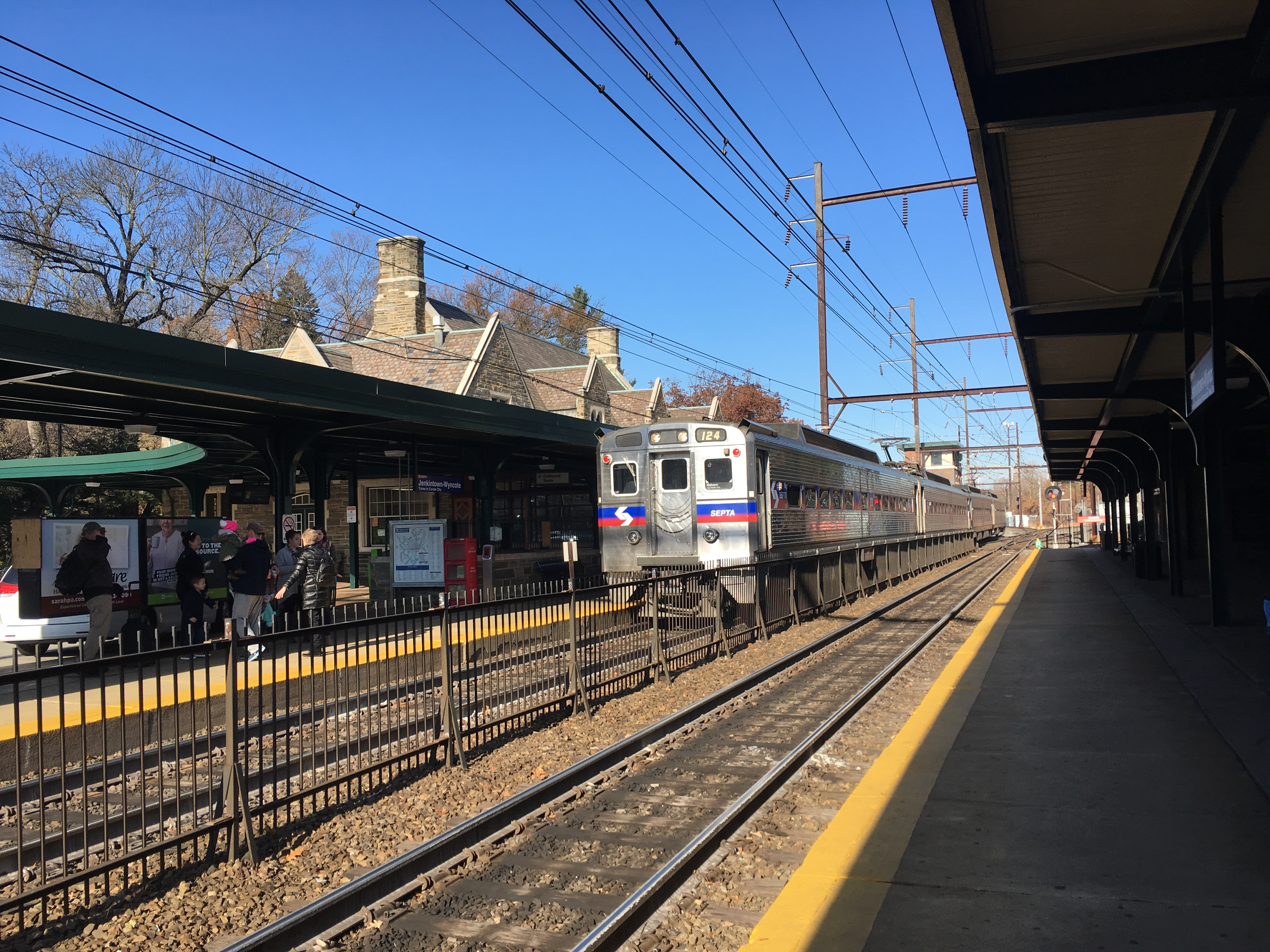
- Jenkintown–Wyncote station, a major stop on the Lansdale/Doylestown line in Jenkintown, Pennsylvania

Overview
- Status: Operating
- Locale: Philadelphia; Montgomery County; Bucks County
- Termini: Penn Medicine Station; Doylestown
- Stations: 27
- Website: septa.org

Service
- Type: Commuter rail
- System: SEPTA Regional Rail
- Route number: R5 Doylestown and R5 Lansdale (1984–2010)
- Operator: SEPTA
- Depot: SEPTA Yards and maintenance facilities
- Rolling stock: Electric multiple units
- Daily ridership: 10,190 (FY 2025)

History
- Electrification: July 26, 1931

Technical
- Character: Grade-separated and at-grade
- Track gauge: 4 ft 8 1/2 in (1,435 mm) standard gauge
- Electrification: Overhead line, 12 kV 25 Hz AC

The Lansdale/Doylestown Line is a SEPTA Regional Rail line connecting Center City Philadelphia to Doylestown in Bucks County, Pennsylvania. With 9,257 daily riders every weekday in FY 2024, it is the second busiest line in SEPTA's Regional Rail network.

Until 1981, diesel-powered trains continued on the Bethlehem Branch from Lansdale to Quakertown, Bethlehem, and Allentown. Restored service on that portion has been proposed, but is not planned by SEPTA. The line is currently used by the East Penn Railroad for freight.

== History ==
=== 20th century ===
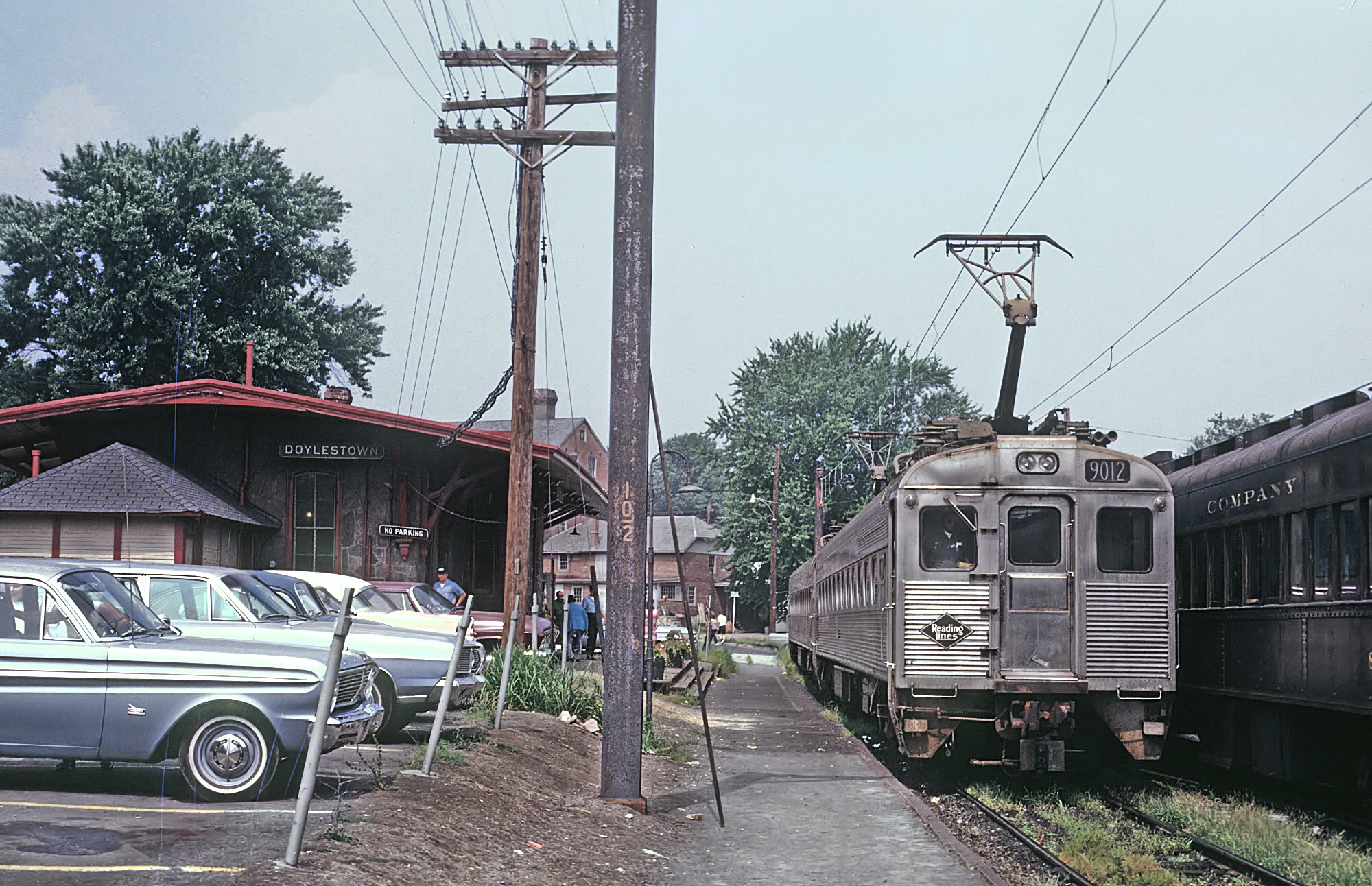
A Reading Company Silverliner II at Doylestown in 1970

The Lansdale/Doylestown Line utilizes what is known as the SEPTA Main Line, a four-track line that has been owned by SEPTA since 1983. Prior to that, it was owned by Conrail between 1976 and 1983 and by the Reading Railroad before 1976. The main part of the line, from Philadelphia north to Lansdale, was part of the Reading Railroad's northbound route from Philadelphia to Bethlehem, and then to Wilkes-Barre and Scranton.

Originally arriving and departing at the former Reading Terminal, now part of the Pennsylvania Convention Center, the line has, since 1985, been directly connected to the ex-PRR/Penn Central side by the Center City Commuter Rail Tunnel. Unlike the ex-PRR/Penn Central Paoli/Thorndale Line it is often paired with for through-service, the ex-RDG line was not as heavily built, as the RDG segregated its through-freight and passenger movements. While the four-track section between the tunnel and Wayne Junction and the two-track section from Wayne Junction to Jenkintown are grade-separated, the two-track section from Jenkintown to Lansdale and the single track from Lansdale to Doylestown has both at-grade railroad crossings and over- and underpasses.

Electrified service between Philadelphia and Hatboro, Lansdale, Doylestown and West Trenton was opened on July 26, 1931. Equipment consisted of dark green painted electric multiple unit cars built at the Reading's own shops. Some of the cars were rebuilt during the 1960s receiving air conditioning, refreshed interior and a new blue paint scheme resulting in their being referred to as "Blueliners". Today, the line uses the Silverliner family of EMU cars which operate throughout SEPTA's Regional Rail system.

Service to Bethlehem and the Lehigh Valley languished due to the post-World War II surge of the automobile as well as the opening of the Pennsylvania Turnpike Northeast Extension in 1957. In 1972, scheduled trips on the 56-mile Reading Bethlehem Line between Bethlehem and Reading Terminal ranged from 1 hour and 28 minutes to 1 hour and 43 minutes. Service north of Lansdale in the non-electrified territory was terminated by SEPTA on July 29, 1981. Trackage north of Quakertown was dismantled after the railbed was leased for use as the interim Saucon Rail Trail.

Between 1984–2010 the route was designated R5 Doylestown and R5 Lansdale as part of SEPTA's diametrical reorganization of its lines. Lansdale and Doylestown trains operated through the city center to the Paoli Line on the ex-Pennsylvania side of the system.

=== 21st century ===
In the early 2000s, upgrades were made to several stations to make them ADA-accessible by giving them elevated platforms. In 2005, construction began on a new station at Fort Washington which was moved 300 feet to the south. In 2007, construction began to reconstruct the platforms at North Wales station and build a new station atop the existing footprint. In 2008, construction began to build a new station at Ambler across the street from the existing station. All three projects were complete by 2010.

The R-number naming system was dropped on July 25, 2010.

On August 29, 2011, SEPTA adjusted the midday service pattern to encourage ridership at Colmar station, which had available parking capacity immediately adjacent to Pennsylvania Route 309. Previously, every other train turned back at Lansdale; those trains then continued on to call at Colmar before terminating at Link Belt, providing half-hourly service at Colmar between the morning and afternoon rush hours.

On December 18, 2011, SEPTA eliminated weekend service at Link Belt and New Britain due to low ridership. In the fall of 2012, New Britain was added back to the weekend schedule as a flag stop.

A large parking garage opened at Lansdale station on April 17, 2017, offering space for over 600 vehicles. 9th Street station opened nearby in 2015 as an alternate parking location during construction, and remains open as part of planned transit-oriented development.

SEPTA activated positive train control on the Lansdale/Doylestown Line from Doylestown to Glenside on June 13, 2016. Positive train control was activated from Glenside to Fern Rock on December 12, 2016 and from Fern Rock to 30th Street on January 9, 2017.

On April 9, 2020, service on the line was truncated to Lansdale due to the COVID-19 pandemic. Service to Doylestown resumed on June 22, 2020. When restoring service in June 2020, service to Melrose Park and Elkins Park stations were eliminated.

Before the pandemic, during peak hours there were 10 trains in the morning (arriving in Center City from open until 9:30 a.m.) and 11 peak trains in the afternoon (leaving Center City between 4 and 7 p.m.). Of the peak morning trains, 5 originated in Doylestown, 2 originated in Colmar, and 3 originated in Lansdale. Five of the peak morning trains were express trains; 3 were express from Fort Washington to Temple University and 2 were express from Jenkintown to Temple University. Of the peak afternoon trains, 5 terminated at Lansdale, 1 terminated at Link Belt, and 5 terminated at Doylestown. Five of the peak afternoon trains were express trains; 4 were express from Temple University to Fort Washington and 1 was express from Temple University to North Wales.

Through the first half of 2024, during the same peak hours, there are only 7 trains in the morning and 6 peak trains in the afternoon. Of the morning trains, only 4 are express trains; one is express from Fort Washington to Temple University, and 3 are express from Jenkintown to Temple University. Only three of the afternoon trains are express; one is express from Temple University to Jenkintown and 1 was express from Temple University to Fort Washington. Beginning in September 2024, SEPTA is restoring up to 80% pre-pandemic capacity across the System. On the Lansdale/Doylestown Line, this means 8 peak trains in the morning and 8 peak trains in the afternoon with roughly half express trains. Of the morning express trains, two ran express from Fort Washington to Temple University, and three ran express from Jenkintown to Temple University, while in the afternoon, two trains ran express from Temple University to Jenkintown and two ran express from Temple University to Fort Washington.

As part of the July 2026 schedule overhaul, all express service between Jenkintown and Temple University was eliminated. Express service now consists of three peak direction trains which run nonstop between Temple University and Fort Washington. All trains originating or terminating at Lansdale stop at Melrose Park and Elkins Park, adding the two stations back to the schedule for the first time since they were eliminated in 2020. All weekend and most weekday trains operate through Center City to Wawa on the Media/Wawa Line.

== Stations ==
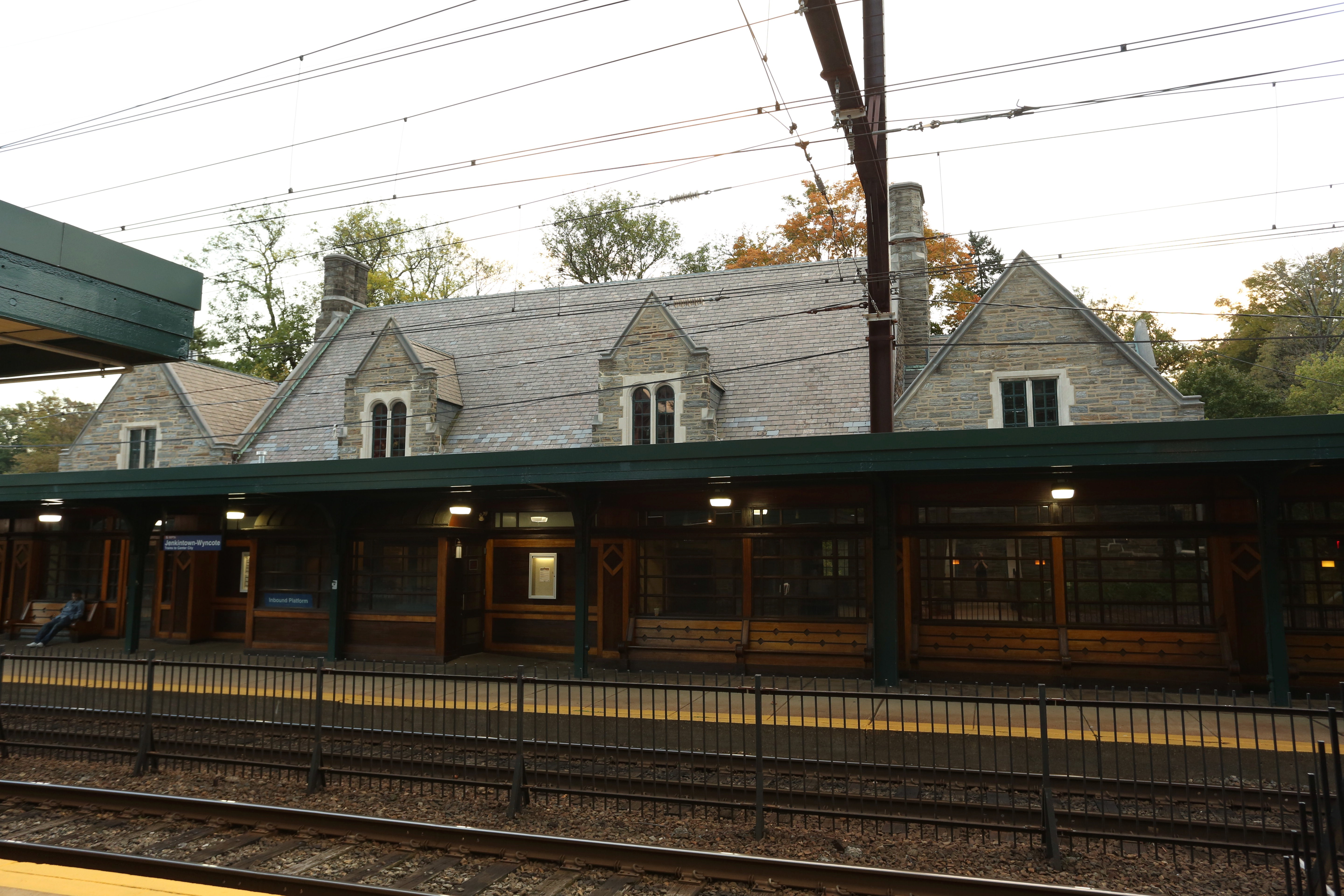
The Reading Company constructed the current building at Jenkintown–Wyncote station in 1932

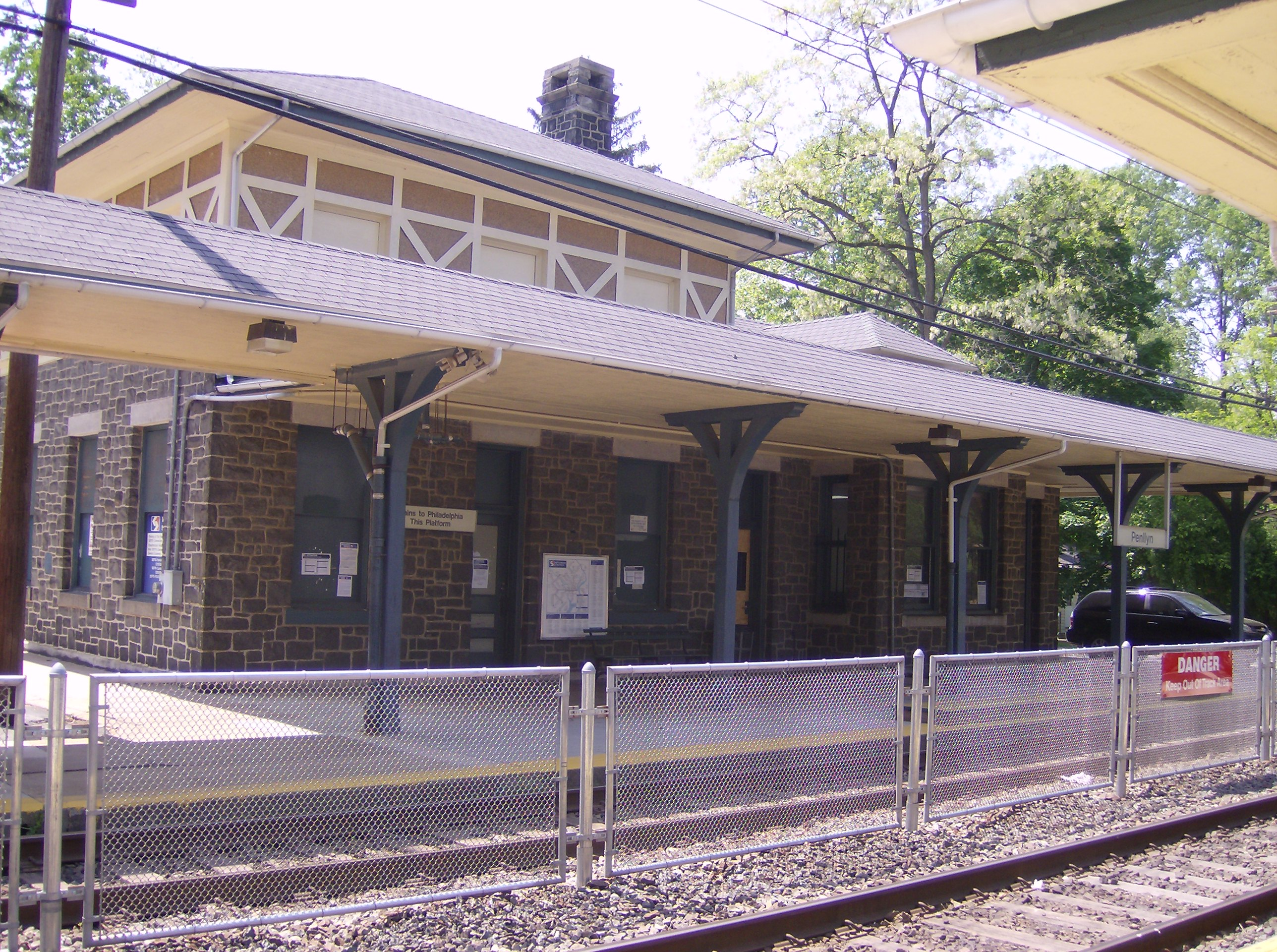
Penllyn station opened in 1930

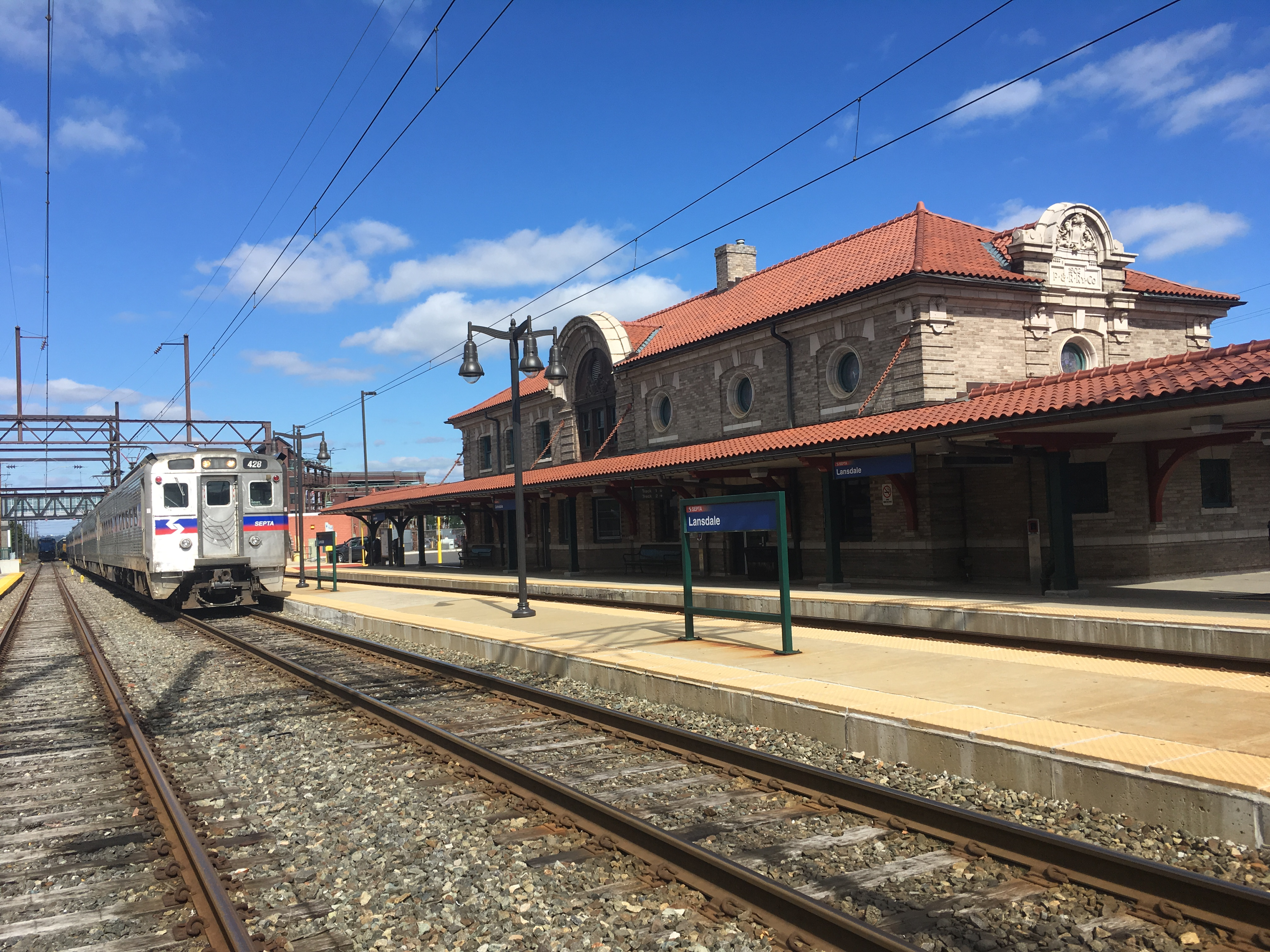
Lansdale station, a major station along the line

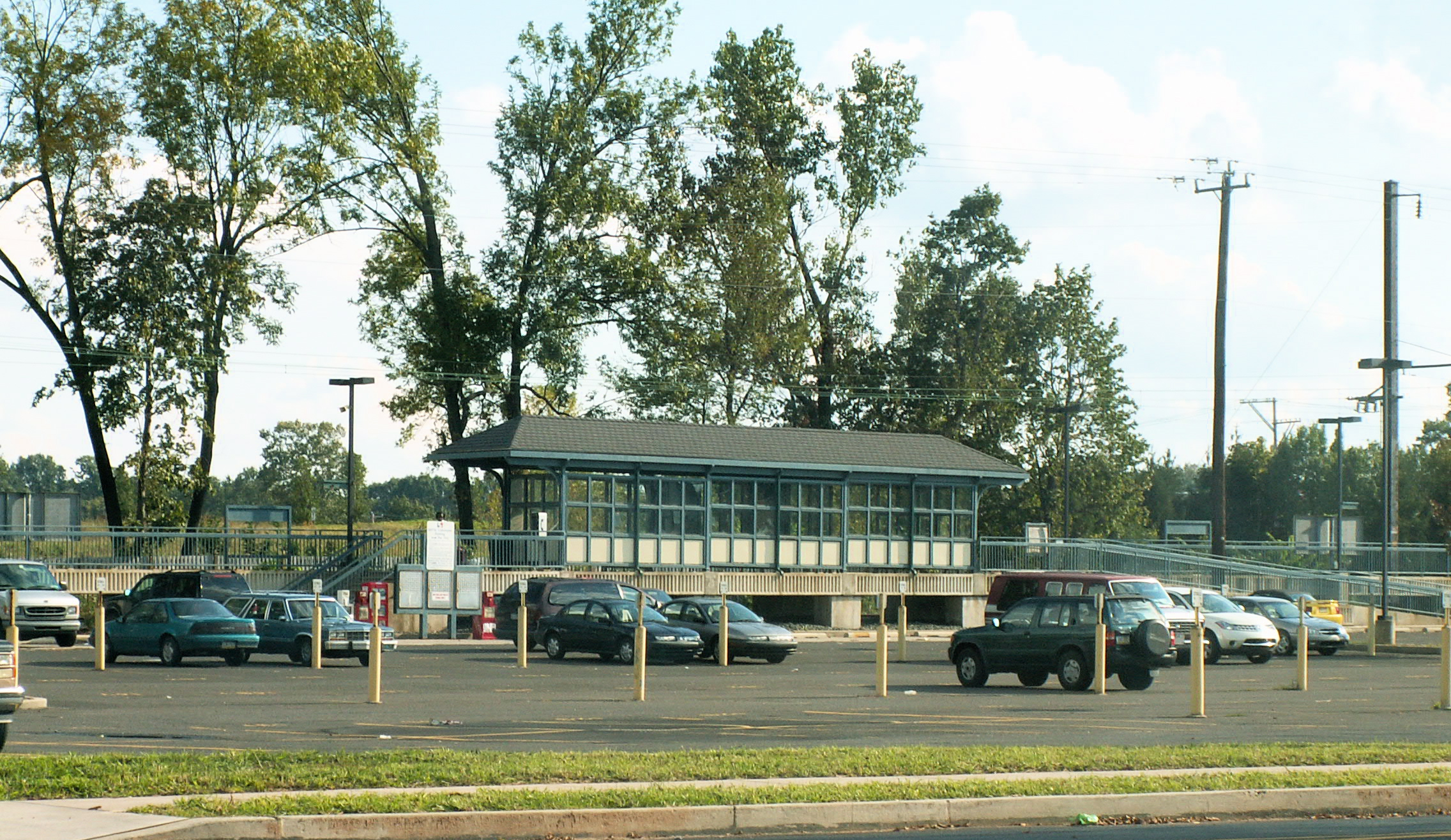
Colmar station in 2006

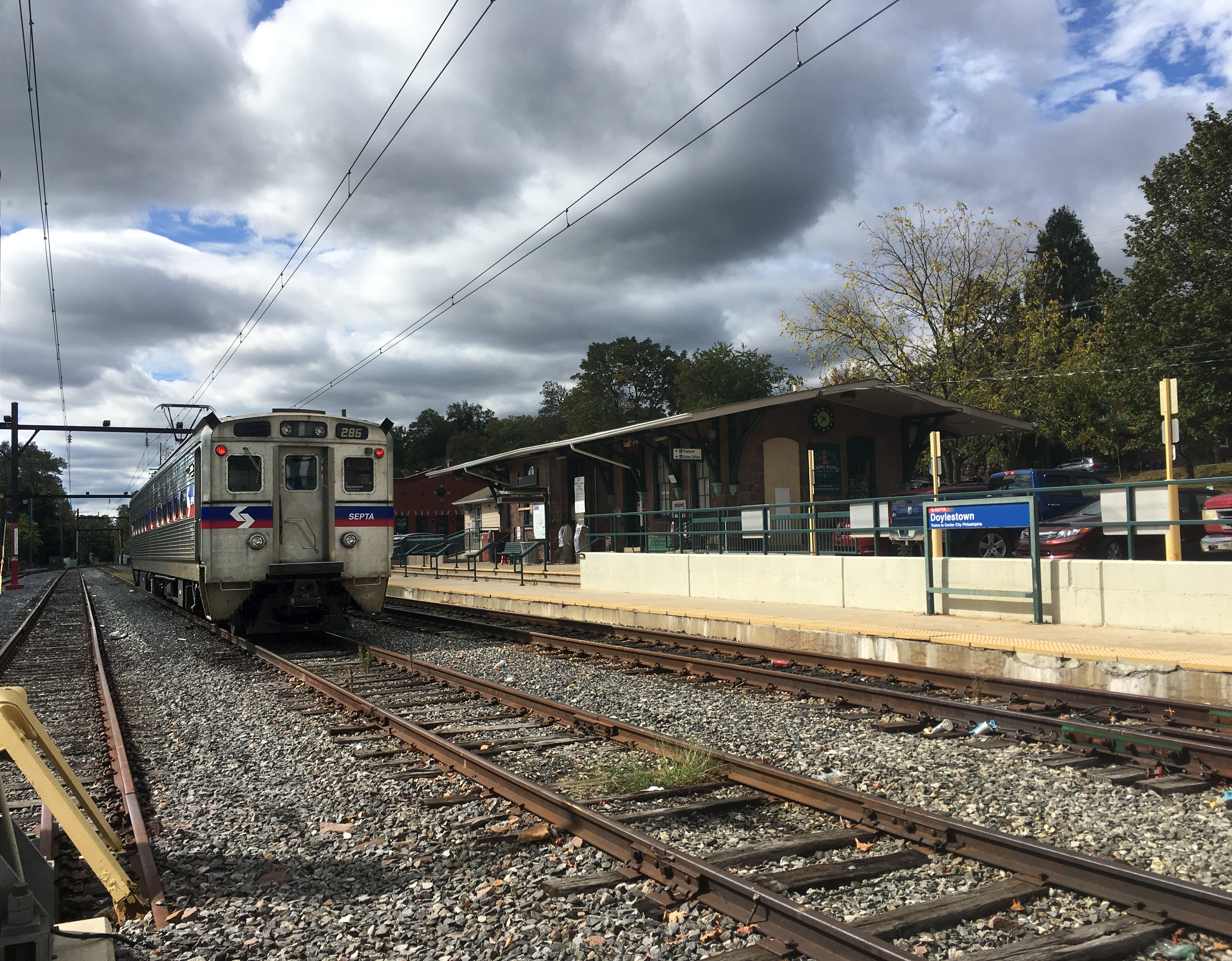
Doylestown station, which serves as the terminus of the Lansdale/Doylestown Line

In 1952, a complete trip from Lansdale station to Reading Terminal took 52 minutes inbound and 48 minutes outbound for a local train stopping at each station with the fastest express train operating at only 37 and 42 minutes, respectively. In 2025, a complete trip from Lansdale station to Jefferson Station also takes 52 minutes inbound and 48 minutes outbound locally; however, the fastest express train only operates at 46 minutes in both directions.

The Lansdale/Doylestown Line makes the following station stops after leaving the Center City Commuter Connection; stations indicated with a gray background are closed.

Zone	Station	Miles (km) from Center City	Date opened	Connections / notes
C	Temple University	2.1 (3.4)	1911	SEPTA Regional Rail: all lines
1	North Broad	2.9 (4.7)	1929	SEPTA Regional Rail: SEPTA Metro: SEPTA City Bus: 4, 16, 54 Known as North Broad Street until 1992.
1	Wayne Junction	5.1 (8.2)	1881	SEPTA Regional Rail: SEPTA City Bus: 2, 23, 53; SEPTA Trackless Trolley: 75
1	Logan			Discontinued by SEPTA on October 4, 1992.
1	Tabor			
1	Fern Rock T.C.	7.3 (11.7)	September 9, 1956	SEPTA Regional Rail: SEPTA Metro: SEPTA City Bus: 4, 28, 57, 70
Philadelphia city line
2	Melrose Park	8.4 (13.5)		SEPTA Regional Rail:
2	Elkins Park	9.2 (14.8)	May 14, 1899	SEPTA Regional Rail: SEPTA City Bus: 28 Originally known as Elkins, but has also been known as Ashbourne.
3	Jenkintown–Wyncote	10.8 (17.4)	1859	SEPTA Regional Rail: SEPTA City Bus: 77 Originally known as Jenkintown.
3	Glenside	11.9 (19.2)		SEPTA Regional Rail: SEPTA City Bus: 22, 77
3	North Hills	13.0 (20.9)		
3	Oreland	13.9 (22.4)	1890	
3	Fellwick	14.8 (23.8)	1855	Known as Sandy Run from 1855–March 1884, Camp Hill from March 1884–February 16, 1931, and Sellwick. Closed on November 10, 1996 due to low ridership.
3	Fort Washington	15.9 (25.6)	1903	SEPTA Suburban Bus: 94, 95, 201
3	Ambler	17.3 (27.8)	1855	SEPTA Suburban Bus: 94, 95 Known as Wissahickon until 1869, when it was renamed after Mary Johnson Ambler, a local hero who helped in the Great Train Wreck of 1856.
3	Penllyn	18.8 (30.3)	1930	SEPTA Suburban Bus: 94
3	Gwynedd Valley	20.0 (32.2)	1888	
4	North Wales	22.4 (36.0)	1873	SEPTA Suburban Bus: 96
4	Pennbrook	23.5 (37.8)		SEPTA Suburban Bus: 94
4	Lansdale	24.4 (39.3)	February 7, 1903	SEPTA Suburban Bus: 96, 132
4	9th Street	25.0 (40.2)	November 15, 2015	
4	Fortuna	25.9 (41.7)		SEPTA Suburban Bus: 132
4	Colmar	26.8 (43.1)	1856	The station was called Line Lexington until 1871.
4	Link Belt	27.5 (44.3)	December 2, 1952	Weekday only flag stop
4	Chalfont	29.7 (47.8)		BCT: DART West
4	New Britain	31.5 (50.7)		BCT: DART West
4	Delaware Valley University	32.8 (52.8)		BCT: Doylestown DART, DART West Known as Farm School until the 1960s, then called Delaware Valley College until 2015.
4	Doylestown	34.4 (55.4)	1871	SEPTA City Bus: 55; BCT: Doylestown DART; Trans-Bridge Lines (to New Hope and New York City); Greyhound Lines (to Allentown and Scranton)

== Ridership ==
Between FY 2013–FY 2019 yearly ridership on the Lansdale/Doylestown Line ranged between 4.6–5.0 million before collapsing during the COVID-19 pandemic. (Note: Data for individual lines is not available for FY 2020.)
