= Colmar, Pennsylvania =

Unincorporated community in Pennsylvania, US

- Unincorporated community
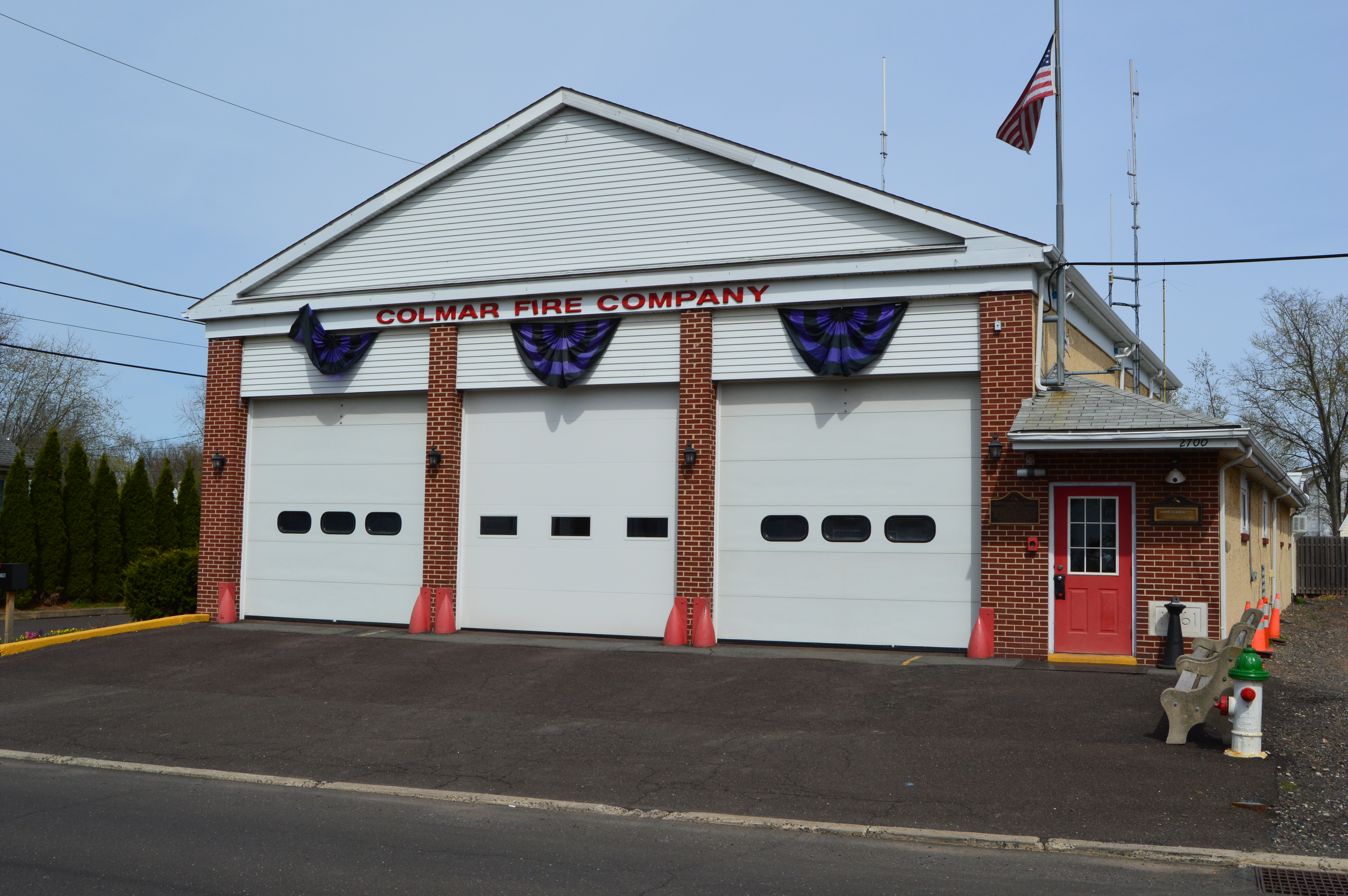
- Colmar Fire House

- Location within Pennsylvania Location within the United States
- Coordinates: 40°16′02″N 75°15′13″W
- Country: United States
- State: Pennsylvania
- County: Montgomery
- Township: Hatfield and Montgomery
- Elevation: 315 ft (96 m)
- Time zone: UTC-5 (Eastern (EST))
  - Summer (DST): UTC-4 (EDT)
- ZIP code: 18915
- Area codes: 215, 267 and 445
- GNIS feature ID: 1172227

Colmar is a suburban unincorporated community located in Montgomery County, Pennsylvania, United States, along State Route 309 (Bethlehem Pike) just northeast of Lansdale. The West Branch Neshaminy Creek forms the community's natural northern boundary and flows eastward into the Neshaminy Creek. It is located in Hatfield and Montgomery Townships. It is served by the North Penn School District and is part of the North Penn Valley region that is centered on the borough of Lansdale. Colmar is important to transportation in the northern portion of the Philadelphia metropolitan area due to its location on Route 309 and having the Colmar station on the Lansdale/Doylestown Line of SEPTA Regional Rail. While Colmar has its own post office, with the ZIP code of 18915, nearby areas use the Hatfield ZIP code of 19440 or the Lansdale ZIP code of 19446.
