= Lansdale station =

Train station in Pennsylvania

Lansdale
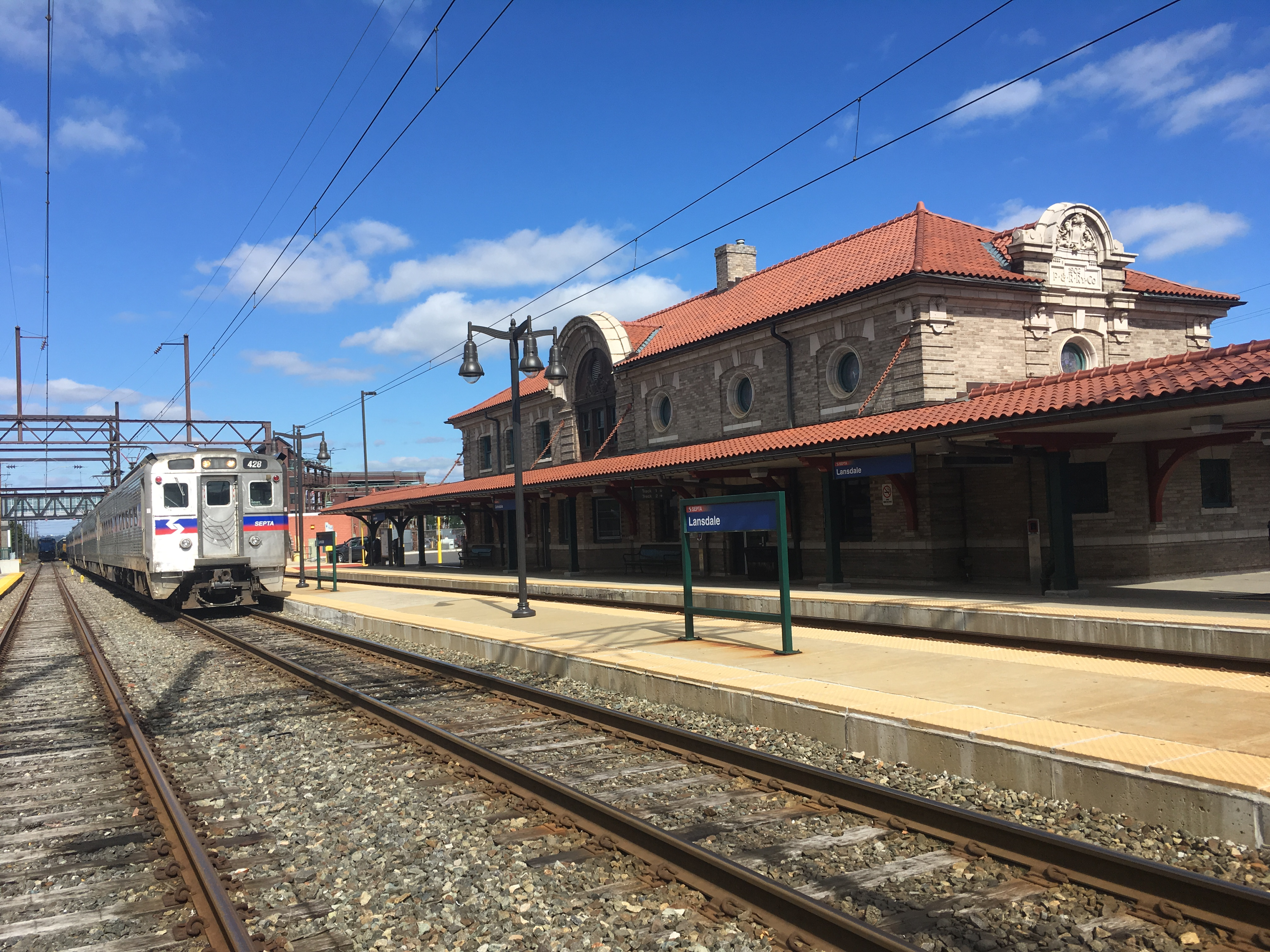
- The former Reading Railroad station depot at Lansdale

General information
- Other names: Lansdale Transportation Center
- Location: 80 West Main Street (PA 63); Lansdale, Pennsylvania, 19446
- Coordinates: 40.2431°N 75.2852°W
- Owner: SEPTA
- Lines: SEPTA Main Line; Doylestown Line
- Platforms: 3 side platforms 1 island platform
- Tracks: 4
- Connections: SEPTA Suburban Bus: 96, 132

Construction
- Platform levels: 1
- Parking: 838
- Cycle facilities: Yes
- Accessible: Yes

Other information
- Fare zone: 4

History
- Opened: February 7, 1903
- Electrified: July 26, 1931

Passengers
- 2017: 1,424 boardings 1,153 alightings (weekday average)
- Rank: 8 of 146

Services
Preceding station	SEPTA	Following station
Pennbrook toward Penn Medicine Station	Lansdale/Doylestown Line	9th Street toward Doylestown
Former services
Preceding station	SEPTA	Following station
Pennbrook toward Reading Terminal	Bethlehem Line	Perkasie toward Allentown
Pennbrook toward Reading Terminal	Bethlehem Line	Hatfield toward Allentown
Preceding station	Lehigh Valley Transit Company	Following station
Hatfield via Couter and Angle stations toward Allentown	Liberty Bell High Speed Line Until 1951	Elm Street via Washington Square, Acorn, and Broad Street stations toward 69th Street
Preceding station	Reading Railroad	Following station
Pennbrook toward Philadelphia	Bethlehem Branch	Orvilla toward Bethlehem
Terminus	Doylestown Branch	Fortuna toward Doylestown
Kneedler toward Elm Street	Stony Creek Branch	Terminus
- Philadelphia & Reading Railway: Lansdale Passenger Station
- U.S. National Register of Historic Places
- Interactive map of Philadelphia & Reading Railway: Lansdale Passenger Station
- Location: Lansdale, Pennsylvania, USA
- Coordinates: 40.2431°N 75.2852°W
- Built: 1903
- NRHP reference No.: 100007217
- Designated: December 21, 2021
Location

Lansdale station, also known as the Lansdale Transportation Center, is a SEPTA Regional Rail station in Lansdale, Pennsylvania. Located at Main Street (PA 63) and Green Street, it serves the Lansdale/Doylestown Line. It was originally built in 1902 by the Reading Company, opening on February 7, 1903; a freight house was added in 1909. Historically, the station hosted the Interstate Express (north to Syracuse) and the Scranton Flyer (north to Scranton). Additionally, the station served commuter trains on the Reading's branch to Bethlehem until service was ended in 1981. The historic station building was listed on the National Register of Historic Places in 2021.

In FY 2013, Lansdale station had a weekday average of 1396 boardings and 1272 alightings.

The station features a 178-space parking lot and a 660-space parking garage. The parking garage at Lansdale station opened on April 17, 2017, offering hundreds of additional parking spaces at the station. Lansdale station is near the SEPTA's 25 Hz Traction Power System plant, originally built by the RDG. The station interior was formerly home to an internet café, and Italian deli called "A Little Something Nice".

Lansdale station was formerly an important transfer point between electric and Budd Rail Diesel Car (RDCs) service to points north, such as Quakertown, Bethlehem, and Allentown. RDC service on the Bethlehem Line was eliminated in 1981 due to budget cuts. Proposals for service restoration to Quakertown have been floated around since the late 1990s, but nothing has gone past the discussion phase. Service restoration beyond Quakertown is no longer generally considered a feasible option, due to SEPTA's leasing of the railroad right-of-way for use as an interim walking trail beyond Quakertown. However, Bucks County locals are looking to utilize the tracks for a heritage railroad.

The train station was listed on the National Register of Historic Places on December 13, 2021 as the Philadelphia & Reading Railway: Lansdale Passenger Station.

== Gallery ==
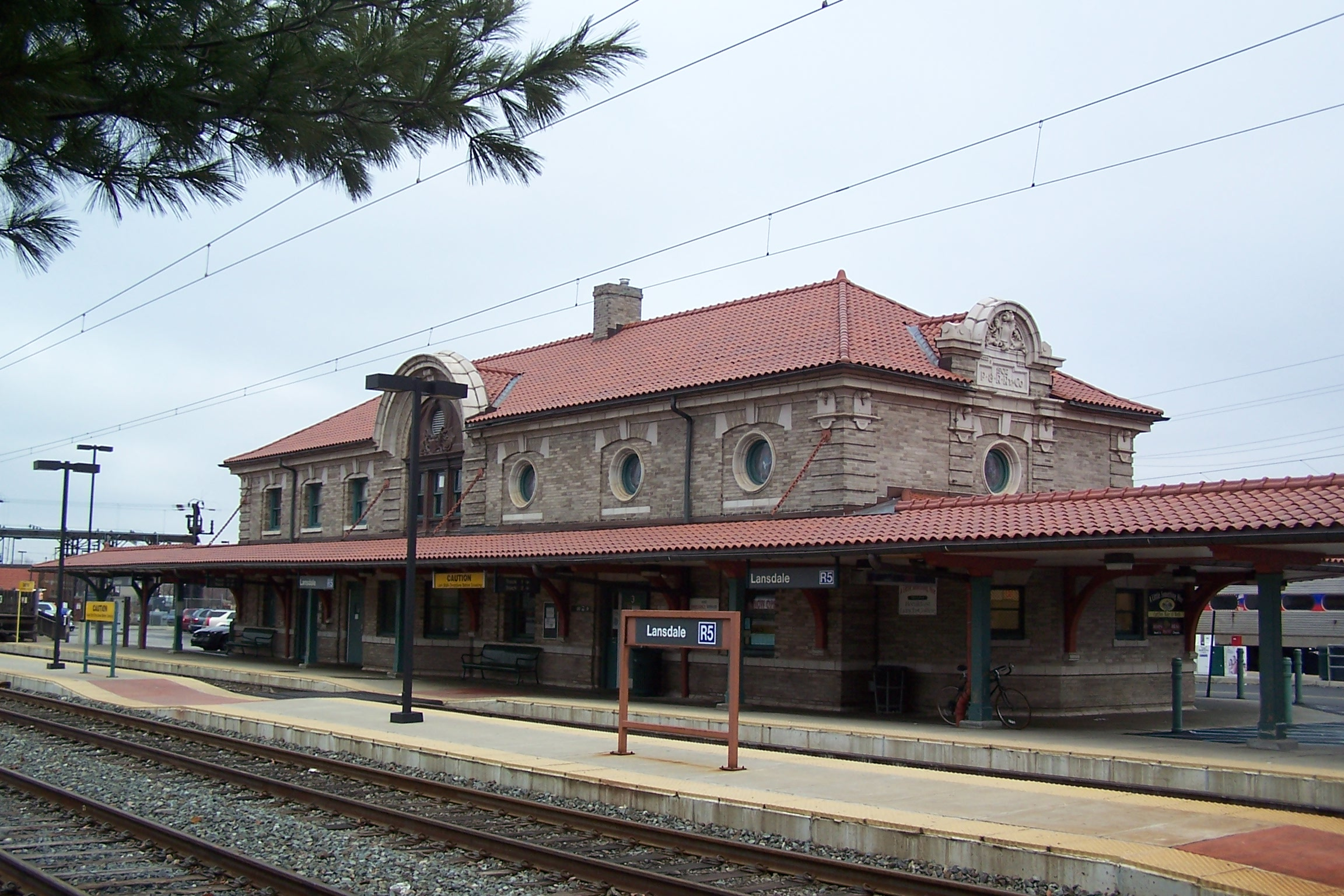
Lansdale station in 2007

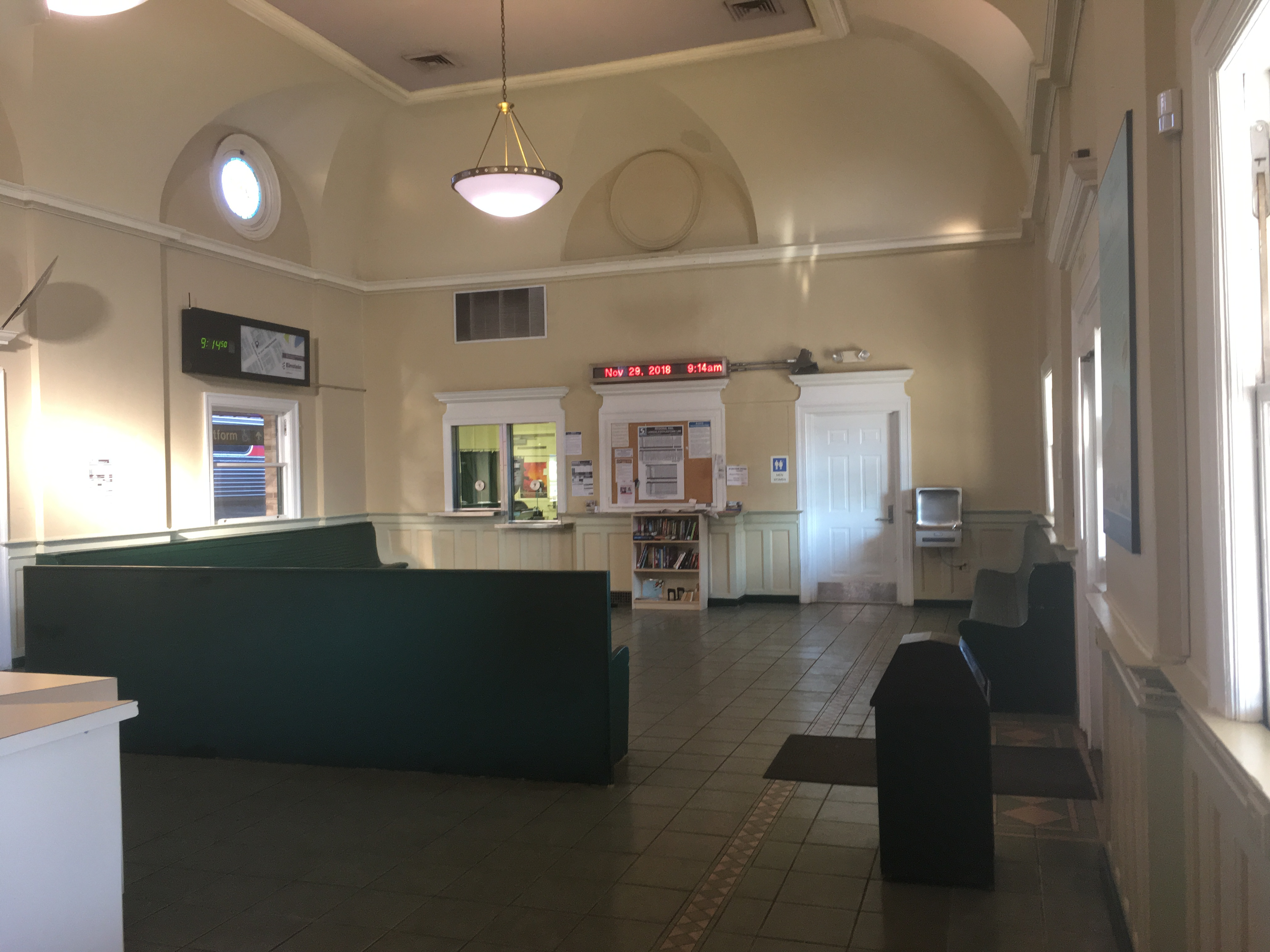
Interior of station building

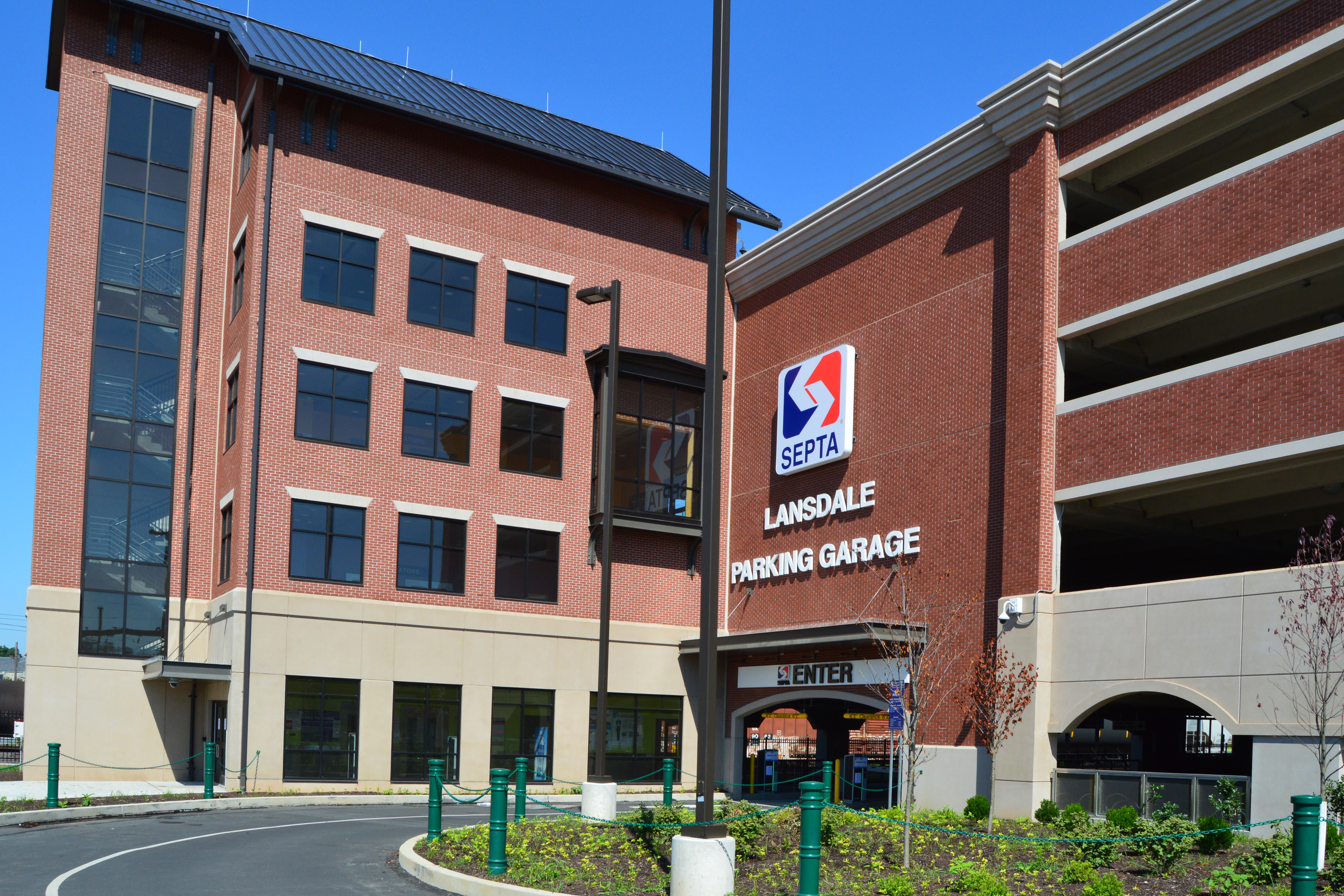
Parking garage
