= Doylestown station =

Railway station in Doylestown, Pennsylvania

Doylestown
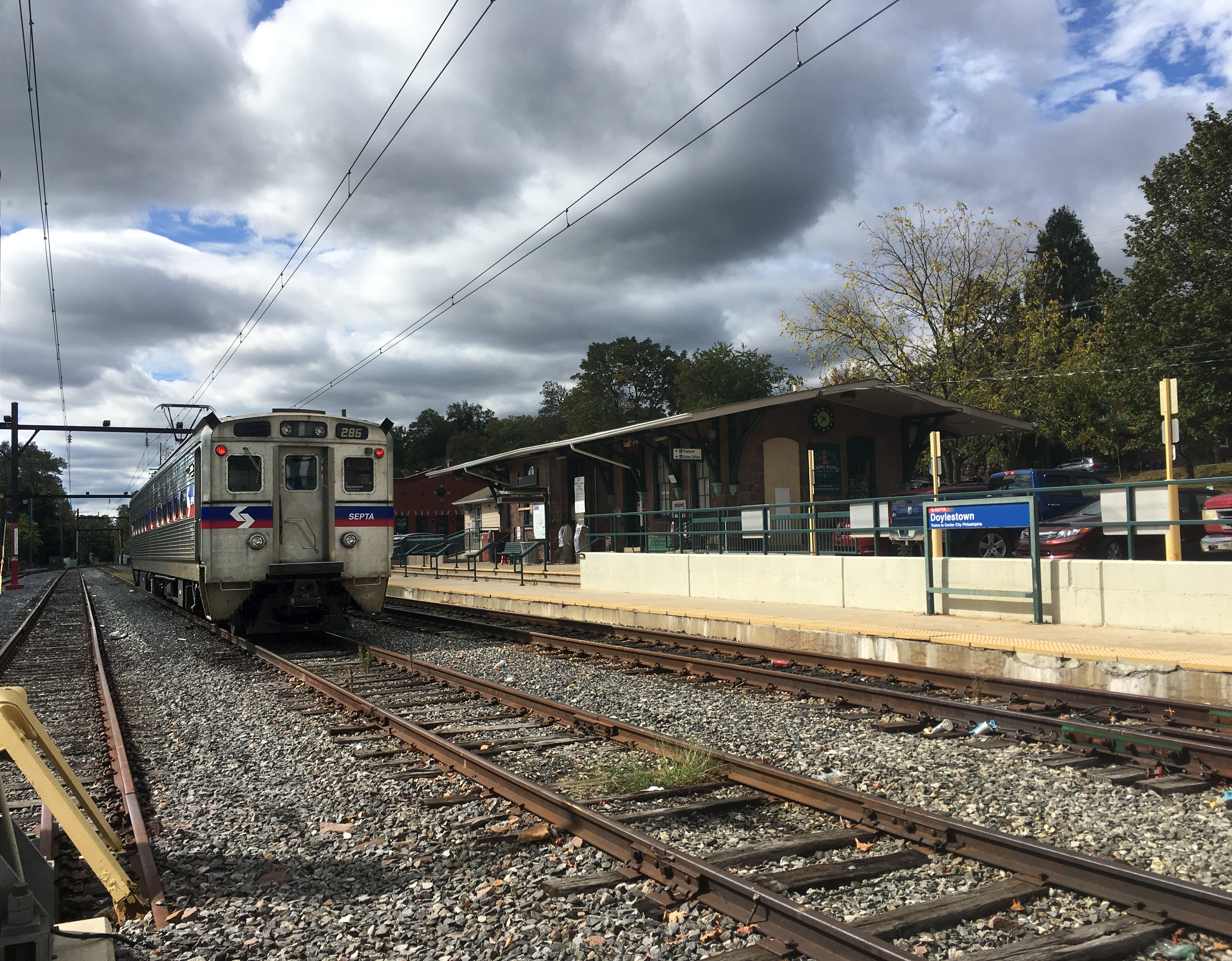
- Doylestown station in October 2017

General information
- Location: 100 South Clinton Avenue (Bridge Street & Clinton Avenue); Doylestown, Pennsylvania 18901
- Coordinates: 40.3062°N 75.1304°W
- Owner: SEPTA
- Platforms: 1 side platform
- Tracks: 5
- Connections: SEPTA City Bus: 55; BCT: Doylestown DART; Trans-Bridge Lines; Greyhound Lines

Construction
- Parking: 169 spaces
- Accessible: Yes

Other information
- Fare zone: 4

History
- Opened: 1871
- Electrified: July 26, 1931

Passengers
- 2017: 317 boardings 241 alightings (weekday average)
- Rank: 86 of 146

Services
| Preceding station | SEPTA | Following station |
|---|---|---|
| Delaware Valley University toward Penn Medicine Station | Lansdale/Doylestown Line | Terminus |
Former services
| Preceding station | Reading Railroad | Following station |
|---|---|---|
| Farm School toward Lansdale | Doylestown Branch | Terminus |
Location

Doylestown station is a SEPTA Regional Rail station in Doylestown, Pennsylvania. It is the last station along SEPTA's Lansdale/Doylestown Line. Located at the intersection of Bridge Street and Clinton Avenue, the station has a 169-space parking lot. It was originally built in 1871 by the Reading Railroad, as a much more elaborate Victorian structure than the present station. It had a decorative cupola over the ticket window and served as a Reading Railroad office at one point. The former freight house survives to this day. This station is wheelchair accessible.

== Description ==
Doylestown station consists of a side platform along the tracks. There are five tracks at the station which allow for storage of trains. The station has a ticket office which is open on weekday mornings, as well as an ATM. In the past there was a pizza shop inside the station building. There is also a canopy-type roof over the platform where people board the trains to keep people dry on rainy days. There are 2 bike racks available that can hold up to 15 bicycles. Doylestown has a parking lot with 169 spaces that charges $1 a day.

Train service at Doylestown is provided along the Lansdale/Doylestown Line of SEPTA Regional Rail, which begins at the station and runs south to Center City Philadelphia. Doylestown station is located in fare zone 4. Service is provided daily from early morning to late evening. Most Lansdale/Doylestown Line trains continue through the Center City Commuter Connection tunnel and become Wilmington/Newark Line trains on weekdays, providing service to Wilmington and Newark, and Paoli/Thorndale Line trains on weekends, providing service to Malvern and Thorndale. In FY 2013, it had a weekday average of 383 boardings and 334 alightings.
