= Delaware Valley (disambiguation) =

Delaware Valley is the valley of the Delaware River in the northeastern United States. By extension, the toponym is commonly applied to the Philadelphia metropolitan area, which straddles the Lower Delaware Valley.

Delaware Valley may also refer to:

- Association of Delaware Valley Independent Schools
- Central Delaware Valley AVA
- Delaware Basin, a geological feature in New Mexico
- Delaware Valley accent, a dialect of the English language otherwise known as Mid-Atlantic American English
- Delaware Valley Association of Rail Passengers
- Delaware Valley Association of Structural Engineers
- Delaware Valley Friends School
- Delaware Valley High School (private school)
- Delaware Valley High School
- Delaware Valley Legacy Fund
- Delaware Valley Mantarays
- Delaware Valley Minority Student Achievement Consortium
- Delaware Valley Ornithological Club
- Delaware Valley Railway
- Delaware Valley Regional High School
- Delaware Valley Regional Planning Commission
- Delaware Valley School District
- Delaware Valley University
- Delaware Valley University station
- Head Cases: Serial Killers in the Delaware Valley
- The Delaware Valley News, former name of The Hunterdon County Democrat
