= Silverliner IV =

Electric multiple unit railcar

PC MA-1E/MA-1F / RDG REG-13 / Silverliner (IV)
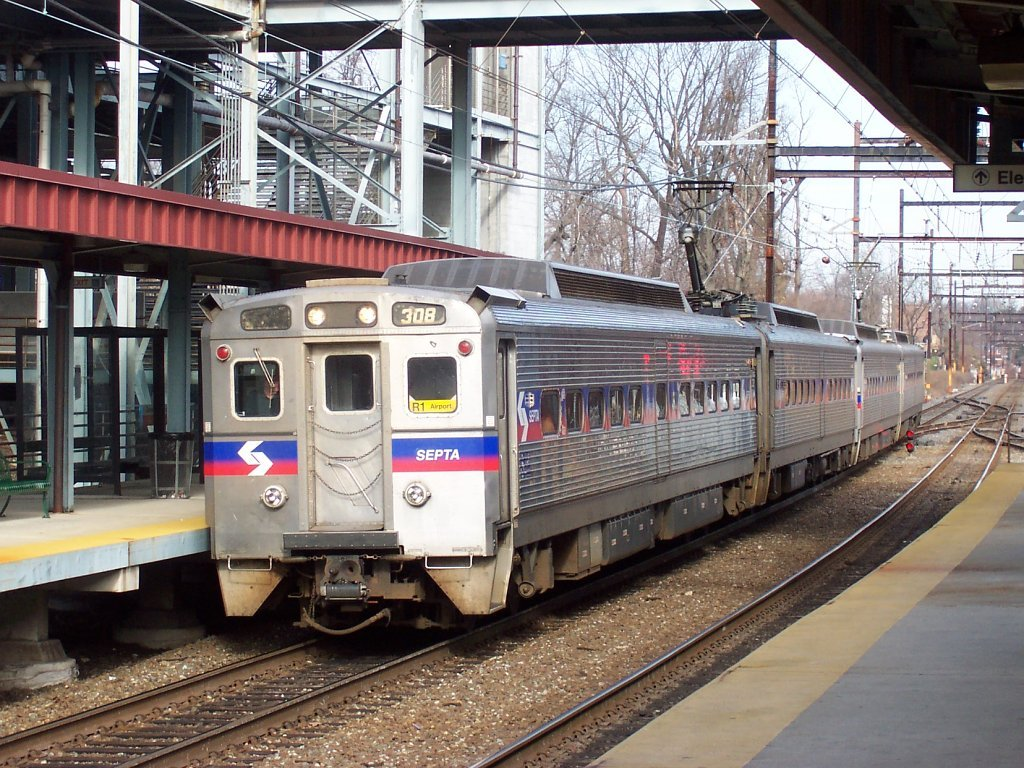
- Silverliner IV 308 at Fern Rock Transportation Center
- In service: 1974–present
- Manufacturers: General Electric, Avco
- Built at: Erie, Pennsylvania
- Family name: Silverliner
- Number built: 232
- Formation: Single unit/ Married pair
- Fleet numbers: PC cars: Single Units: 274-303, Married Pairs: 304-399; Reading cars: Single Units: 9018-9031, Married Pairs: 101-188; Current: Single Units: 270-304, 400-416; Married Pairs: 101-188, 305-399, 417-460
- Capacity: 155
- Operators: Reading Railroad; Penn Central Railroad; Conrail; SEPTA

Specifications
- Car body construction: Stainless steel
- Car length: 85 ft (25.91 m)
- Width: 9 ft 11 1/2 in (3.035 m)
- Height: 14 ft 5 in (4.39 m)
- Doors: 2 single leaf pocket end doors per side w/ traps
- Maximum speed: 100 mph (160 km/h)
- Weight: 120,600 lb (54,700 kg)
- Traction system: Transformed line current fed through a combination of silicon and mercury arc Ignitron rectifiers in conjunction with a phase angle motor controller. All commuter cars later converted entirely to silicon rectifier.
- Power output: 550 hp (410 kW)
- Electric system: 11-13.5 kV 25 Hz AC
- Current collection: Pantograph
- UIC classification: Bo’Bo’
- AAR wheel arrangement: B-B
- Braking systems: Pneumatic, Dynamic
- Coupling system: WABCO Model N-2
- Track gauge: 4 ft 8 1/2 in (1,435 mm) standard gauge

The Silverliner IV is the fourth-generation electric multiple unit railcar in the Silverliner family. It was designed and built by General Electric and was delivered between 1973 and 1976. It operates on the SEPTA Regional Rail network throughout Greater Philadelphia.

The 232-car Silverliner IV order was the largest order in the Silverliner series at the time. It allowed for the retirement of most of the Reading electric multiple units and PRR MP54 cars, many of which dated from the 1900s through the 1920s. More than four times as numerous as the previous Silverliner cars combined, the Silverliner IV became SEPTA's most common passenger railcar upon entering service in the mid-1970s. Like the Silverliner II and III cars, the IV cars were owned by SEPTA and provided to the private railroads for use in their state-supported commuter rail operations until SEPTA assumed direct operation in 1983.

== Features ==
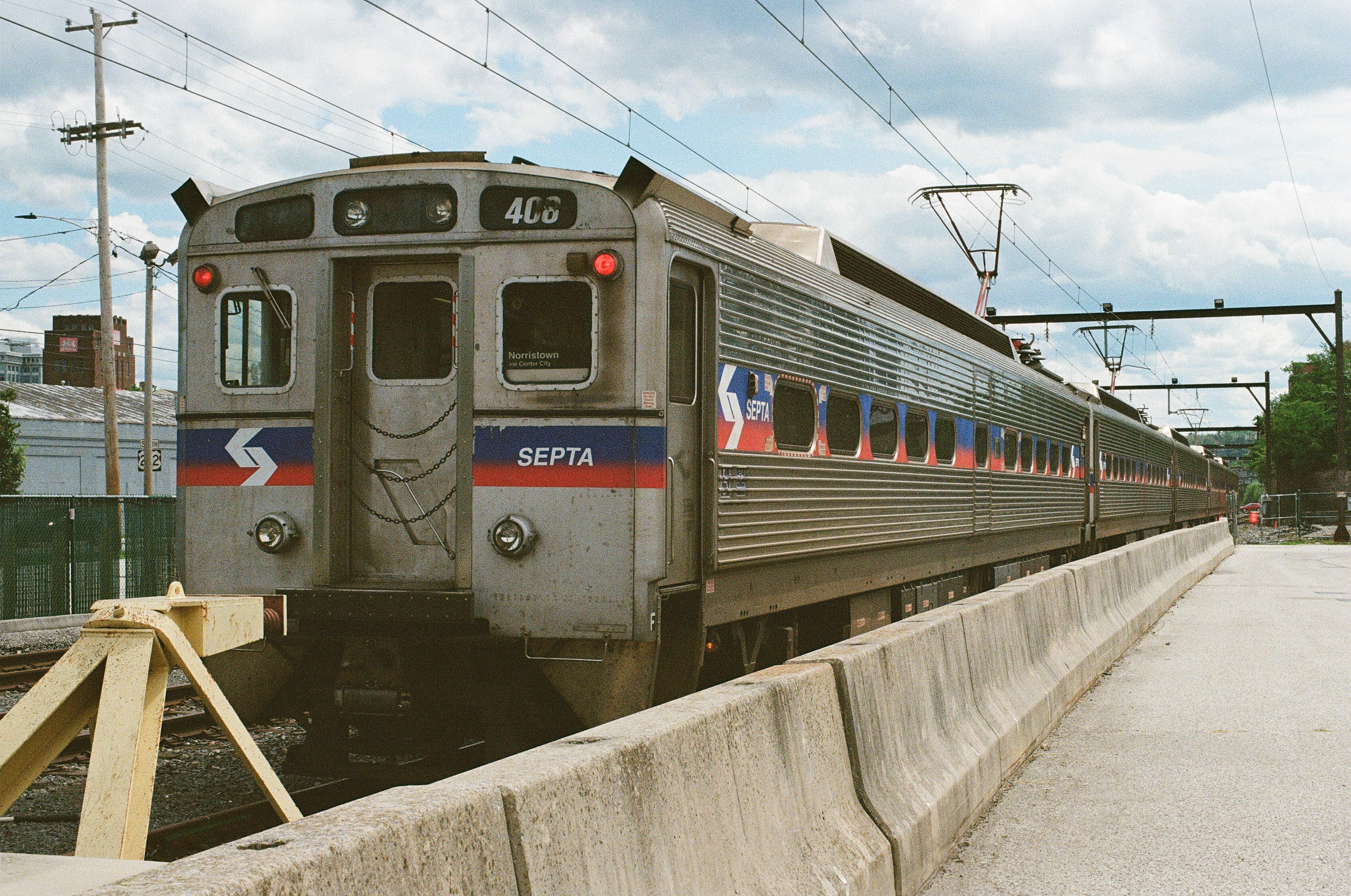
SEPTA GE Silverliner IV parked at Elm Street station

The cars were ordered from General Electric and Avco. Aside from the boxier look and smaller side windows, the main changes between the new IVs and earlier Silverliners included a dynamic brake system, for which the resistance grids were fitted in the car's signature roof hump, and, for the Penn Central cars, a trainline automatic door system which removed the need for train crew to manually open doors at high level platforms. The Silverliner IVs were also the first to be delivered in a married pair configuration, although a minority of cars were outfitted as single units. They were also the first to be equipped with a PA system. The delivery of the Silverliner IVs allowed SEPTA to replace most of its remaining PRR MP54s and Reading's pre-war MU fleet save for the 38 rebuilt "Blueliner" cars. While being fitted with an updated propulsion system from General Electric, the Silverliner IVs were nevertheless still delivered with Ignitron tube rectifiers, which were later replaced with silicon controlled rectifiers.

A readily apparent external feature of the Silverliner IV is a windowed body panel plug in the middle of the cars on each side, a provision for high-platform-only center doors which have never been installed, in contrast with New Jersey Transit's similar, contemporary Arrow II and III cars which were built with such doors. Internally, pairs of seats occupy this partitioned area which was intended for passenger flow.

== Delivery ==
The Reading got the first batch of Silverliner IVs in the form of 14 single unit cars produced during 1973. The first two (#9018 and #9019) were unveiled to the press on Thursday, February 21, 1974. These were numbered in series with their existing Silverliner IIs, 9018 through 9031. In 1974-75 the Penn Central took delivery of 34 single units numbered 270 through 303. Delivery of the Silverliner IVs were briefly interrupted by the production of 70 Arrow II cars for the New Jersey Department of Transportation before the Penn Central received 96 pairs numbered 304 through 399. Finally in 1976 the Reading took delivery of a final batch of 88 pairs numbered 101 through 188. All the IVs were delivered with the circular SEPTA logo on the left, and the Penn Central or Reading logo on the right, of all car sides and ends, although the Reading black diamond logo was omitted (and the space left blank) on cars 129-188 which were delivered after the Reading Company was absorbed into Conrail on April 1, 1976. These logos remained mostly intact until 1983, when SEPTA took over commuter rail operations from Conrail and quickly began applying its current rectangular logo over all the others.

== Modifications ==
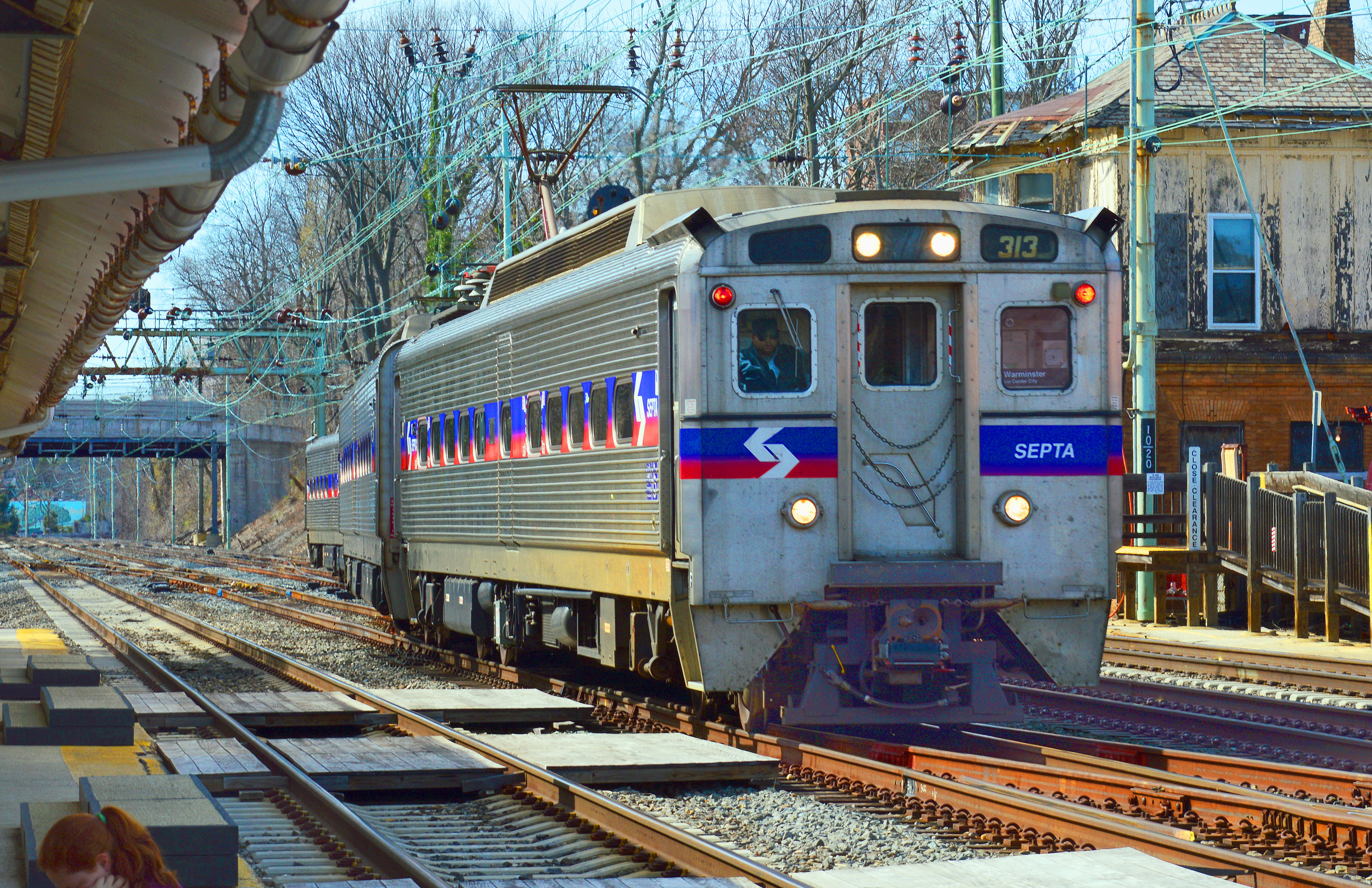
SEPTA GE Silverliner IV at Bryn Mawr, PA, interlocking

The Silverliner IVs have never been officially rebuilt, but there have been a number of modifications to the class. The propulsion system was initially upgraded from the original mercury arc–based Ignitron rectifiers to more reliable solid state silicon controlled rectifiers and later the main transformers had their coolant replaced with one that did not contain PCBs. As this change was carried out in the early 1990s, all of the 9000 series Reading cars and some of the Penn Central cars were renumbered into the series 400 through 460 to help keep track of which units had undergone the modification. When the Center City Commuter Connection opened in 1984, the Reading cars were converted to full train automatic door operation to take advantage of the high level platforms at the new Market East Station (now Jefferson Station) and others on the former PRR "side" of the system. In the late 1990s the fleet received its most noticeable upgrade with the original "ketchup and mustard" colored interior replaced with a softer gray motif as well as softer seating. Around 2004 SEPTA began to replace the cowcatcher pilots equipped on the original Reading cars with a bar type pilot to match those on the PRR cars. Starting in 2009 SEPTA began to replace the original Faiveley pantographs with more modern Schunk type units.

== Service history ==
SEPTA Silverliner IV 293, which is painted in a Reading Railroad heritage unit scheme

The Silverliner IV fleet has provided service on all of SEPTA's Regional Rail routes, providing the backbone of SEPTA's service plan, with older equipment tending to be used on peak services only. Most SEPTA trains consist of a single pair of Silverliner IVs, with longer trains made up as needed. The single units are most frequently coupled to pairs to make 5 or 3 car trainsets, although single units are run alone on Cynwyd Line service.

In 2013, SEPTA announced it had begun the process of replacing the Silverliner IV fleet, and in 2015, listed the replacement of the Silverliner IV with the as of yet built Silverliner VI as part of its ongoing renewal program, though no timeline was given for the retirement of the Silverliner IV fleet. Only one car, #9020, has been retired as of 2023 after a severe rear-end collision in the vicinity of the North Wales station in 1980, which damaged the car beyond repair.

Five Silverliner IVs, numbered 276 (Pennsylvania Railroad), 280, 293 (both Reading Company), 304 (Conrail), and 401 (Penn Central), were repainted into retro heritage liveries in 2024.

=== Future retirement ===
As of 2023 retirement plans have been announced for the Silverliner IVs, though no timeline has been given yet.

=== Fire damaged vehicles ===
On August 29, 2018, car 144 was heavily damaged in an electrical fire at Glenside station. Its mate, car 143, was repaired. Single car 278 was renumbered to 144 and mated to 143. The burnt 144 was renumbered to 278, with the possibility of being converted to a control car for work trains. This experiment did not workout and 144 was renumbered back to 278 and is in-service as a single car.

On February 6, 2025, car 132 caught on fire near the Crum Lynne station. Subsequent fires to the Silverliner IV fleet occurred in June, July, and September of 2025.

The National Transportation Safety Board investigated the fires. In October, NTSB recommended that SEPTA immediately suspend using the cars until it can figure out the causes of the fires and implement a plan to correct the issues. SEPTA said it disagreed with the findings and would not suspend the fleet.

On October 2, 2025, the Federal Railroad Administration ordered SEPTA to remove the rail cars from service for inspection, granting the agency 30 days to complete the process.

=== Preservation efforts ===
Railfans in the Philadelphia area are looking to preserve the legacy of the Silverliner IVs by producing them as model trains.

== See also ==
- Arrow (railcar)
