= EPB (disambiguation) =

EPB is an American electric power distribution and telecommunications company.

EPB may also refer to:

== Organisations ==
- Boricua Popular Army (Spanish: Ejército Popular Boricua), a clandestine organization based in Puerto Rico
- Euro Pacific Bank, a bank; see Perth Mint
- Export Promotion Bureau (Bangladesh)
- Export Promotion Bureau of Pakistan, now the Trade Development Authority of Pakistan

== Science and technology ==
- Earth pressure balance, a machine used in mining
- Electronic parking brake, of a vehicle
- Electro-pneumatic brake system on British railway trains
- Extensor pollicis brevis, a muscle of the thumb

== Other uses ==
- EPB, class designation for rail coaches used by Reading electric multiple units on its Philadelphia, US commuter rail lines
