= Delaware Valley Minority Student Achievement Consortium =

The Delaware Valley Minority Student Achievement Consortium began as an initiative of the Penn Center for Educational Leadership in the Graduate School of Education at the University of Pennsylvania, in collaboration with the School District of Cheltenham Township, and in partnership with the Pennsylvania Department of Education. Together the participants initiated a project for developing and sustaining a regional network of 15 suburban districts that would be committed to working together to enhance the achievement and well-being of all students.

The Consortium seeks to measurably and appreciably reduce the disparities in achievement and educational engagement between African American and Hispanic students and their Caucasian and Asian peers both within and among the collective districts that belong to the Consortium.
