= Delaware Valley Association of Rail Passengers =

- Abbreviation: DVARP
- Formation: 1972
- Type: NGO, advocacy group
- Purpose: Advocacy supporting passenger rail and public transit
- Location: 1635 Market Street, Suite 1600, Philadelphia, PA, 19103, United States
- Region served: Philadelphia metropolitan area
- President: Anthony Lanzilotti
- Vice President: Ed Bombaro
- Treasurer: Tony Desantis
- Secretary: John Corbett
- Key people: Ed Bombaro, John Corbett, Tony Desantis, Anthony Lanzilotti, Matt Mitchell, Tom Walker, 1 Vacancy
- Main organ: Board of Directors
- Affiliations: Rail Passengers Association
- Website: dvarp.org

The Delaware Valley Association of Rail Passengers (DVARP) is an all-volunteer, mass transit advocacy group in the Philadelphia metropolitan area. DVARP was founded in 1972, and has engaged in rail and transit advocacy since that time. The group was officially incorporated as a 501(c)(3) non-profit organization in 1996.
