= Lower Southampton Township, Pennsylvania =

Township in Pennsylvania, US

Lower Southampton Township
- Township
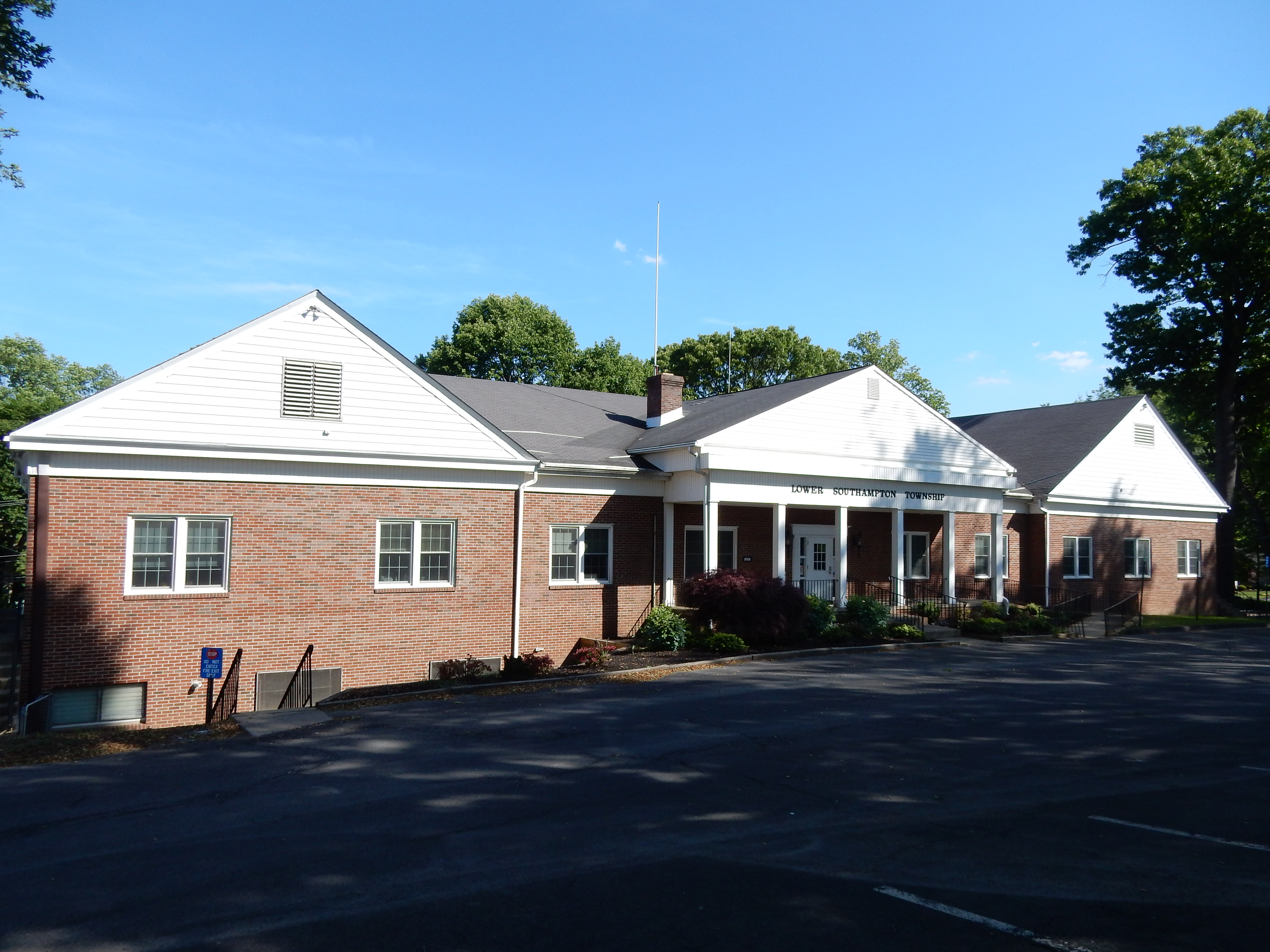
- Township Hall

- Seal

- Location in Pennsylvania and the United States Lower Southampton Township (the United States)
- Coordinates: 40°09′14″N 74°59′05″W
- Country: United States
- State: Pennsylvania
- County: Bucks

Area
  - Total: 6.72 sq mi (17.4 km^{2})
  - Land: 6.67 sq mi (17.3 km^{2})
  - Water: 0.04 sq mi (0.10 km^{2})
- Elevation: 200 ft (61 m)

Population (2020)
  - Total: 20,599
  - Density: 3,090/sq mi (1,190/km^{2})
- Time zone: UTC-5 (EST)
  - Summer (DST): UTC-4 (EDT)
- Area codes: 215, 267 and 445
- FIPS code: 42-017-45112
- Website: www.lowersouthamptontownship.org

Lower Southampton Township is a township in Bucks County, Pennsylvania, United States. The population was 20,599 at the 2020 census.

== Geography ==
According to the U.S. Census Bureau, the township has a total area of 6.7 square miles (17.3 km^{2}), all land.

Past and present place names include Feasterville-Trevose, Chinquapin, Churchville, Feasterville, Playwicki, Readingville, Siles, Oakford, Trevose, and Langhorne.

Natural features include Edge Hill, Neshaminy Creek, Neshaminy Falls, and Poquessing Creek.

== Demographics ==
As of the 2010 census, the township was 91.9% Non-Hispanic White, 1.8% Black or African American, 0.2% Native American, 2.5% Asian, and 1.1% were two or more races. 2.8% of the population were of Hispanic or Latino ancestry.

As of the census of 2000, there were 19,276 people, 7,152 households, and 5,428 families residing in the township. The population density was 2,886/sq mi (1,114/km^{2}). There were 7,333 housing units at an average density of 1,098/sq mi (423.9/km^{2}). The racial makeup of the township was 96.34% White, 1.07% African American, 0.06% Native American, 1.37% Asian, 0.01% Pacific Islander, 0.42% from other races, and 0.73% from two or more races. Hispanic or Latino of any race were 1.41% of the population.

There were 7,152 households, out of which 32.7% had children under the age of 18 living with them, 63.5% were married couples living together, 8.8% had a female householder with no husband present, and 24.1% were non-families. 19.9% of all households consisted of individuals, and 7.6% had someone living alone who was 65 years of age or older. The average household size was 2.67, and the average family size was 3.10.

In the township the population was spread out, with 22.9% under the age of 18, 7.3% from 18 to 24, 29.3% from 25 to 44, 26.2% from 45 to 64, and 14.3% who were 65 years of age or older. The median age was 40 years. For every 100 females, there were 97.4 males. For every 100 females age 18 and over, there were 95.2 males.

The median income for a household in the township was $57,011, and the median income for a family was $62,209. Males had a median income of $41,902 versus $32,073 for females. The per capita income for the township was $24,367. About 2.7% of families and 3.3% of the population were below the poverty line, including 3.6% of those under age 18 and 5.2% of those age 65 or over.

Historical population
Census	Pop.	Note	%±
1930	1,077		—
1940	1,843		71.1%
1950	3,562		93.3%
1960	12,619		254.3%
1970	17,578		39.3%
1980	18,305		4.1%
1990	19,860		8.5%
2000	19,276		−2.9%
2010	18,909		−1.9%
2020	20,599		8.9%

== Education ==
Lower Southampton Township lies within the Neshaminy School District. Public school students within township boundaries may attend Joseph Ferderbar Elementary School or Tawanka Elementary School for grades K-4, depending on where they live. Poquessing Middle School serves students in grades 5–8, and Neshaminy High School serves students in grades 9–12.

St. Katharine Drexel Regional Catholic School in Holland is the local Catholic grade school. In 2012, Assumption B.V.M. Catholic School in Feasterville merged with St. Bede the Venerable School in Holland to form St. Katharine Drexel.

== Climate ==
According to the Köppen climate classification system, Lower Southampton Twp has a Hot-summer, Humid continental climate (Dfa). Dfa climates are characterized by at least one month having an average mean temperature ≤ 32.0 °F (0.0 °C), at least four months with an average mean temperature ≥ 50.0 °F (10.0 °C), at least one month with an average mean temperature ≥ 71.6 °F (22.0 °C) and no significant precipitation difference between seasons. Although most summer days are slightly humid in Lower Southampton Twp, episodes of heat and high humidity can occur with heat index values > 107 °F (42 °C). Since 1981, the highest air temperature was 102.8 °F (39.3 °C) on July 22, 2011, and the highest daily average mean dew point was 76.1 °F (24.5 °C) on August 13, 1999. The average wettest month is July which corresponds with the annual peak in thunderstorm activity. Since 1981, the wettest calendar day was 6.73 inches (171 mm) on August 27, 2011. During the winter months, the average annual extreme minimum air temperature is 1.1 °F (−17.2 °C). Since 1981, the coldest air temperature was −9.4 °F (−23.0 °C) on January 22, 1984. Episodes of extreme cold and wind can occur with wind chill values < −9 °F (−23 °C). The average annual snowfall (Nov-Apr) is between 24 inches (61 cm) and 30 inches (76 cm). Ice storms and large snowstorms depositing ≥ 12 inches (30 cm) of snow occur once every few years, particularly during nor’easters from December through February.

Climate data for Lower Southampton Twp, Elevation 223 ft (68 m), 1981-2010 normals, extremes 1981-2018
Month	Jan	Feb	Mar	Apr	May	Jun	Jul	Aug	Sep	Oct	Nov	Dec	Year
Record high °F (°C)	71.6 (22.0)	77.9 (25.5)	87.3 (30.7)	94.2 (34.6)	95.3 (35.2)	96.4 (35.8)	102.8 (39.3)	100.5 (38.1)	98.3 (36.8)	88.8 (31.6)	81.3 (27.4)	76.0 (24.4)	102.8 (39.3)
Mean daily maximum °F (°C)	39.9 (4.4)	43.0 (6.1)	51.3 (10.7)	63.0 (17.2)	72.6 (22.6)	81.8 (27.7)	85.9 (29.9)	84.3 (29.1)	77.5 (25.3)	66.2 (19.0)	55.3 (12.9)	44.2 (6.8)	63.8 (17.7)
Daily mean °F (°C)	31.8 (−0.1)	34.4 (1.3)	41.8 (5.4)	52.4 (11.3)	61.9 (16.6)	71.4 (21.9)	76.0 (24.4)	74.5 (23.6)	67.4 (19.7)	55.8 (13.2)	46.2 (7.9)	36.3 (2.4)	54.3 (12.4)
Mean daily minimum °F (°C)	23.8 (−4.6)	25.7 (−3.5)	32.3 (0.2)	41.8 (5.4)	51.1 (10.6)	61.0 (16.1)	66.0 (18.9)	64.7 (18.2)	57.3 (14.1)	45.5 (7.5)	37.0 (2.8)	28.4 (−2.0)	44.6 (7.0)
Record low °F (°C)	−9.4 (−23.0)	−2.2 (−19.0)	4.2 (−15.4)	18.0 (−7.8)	34.0 (1.1)	42.7 (5.9)	49.1 (9.5)	43.5 (6.4)	36.8 (2.7)	25.5 (−3.6)	13.0 (−10.6)	−0.3 (−17.9)	−9.4 (−23.0)
Average precipitation inches (mm)	3.55 (90)	2.73 (69)	4.14 (105)	3.98 (101)	4.33 (110)	4.34 (110)	5.20 (132)	4.41 (112)	4.39 (112)	3.75 (95)	3.62 (92)	3.96 (101)	48.40 (1,229)
Average relative humidity (%)	66.2	62.7	58.2	57.9	62.4	65.9	66.6	68.8	69.8	69.3	67.7	68.4	65.4
Average dew point °F (°C)	21.8 (−5.7)	23.0 (−5.0)	28.2 (−2.1)	38.0 (3.3)	48.9 (9.4)	59.4 (15.2)	64.1 (17.8)	63.6 (17.6)	57.2 (14.0)	45.9 (7.7)	36.1 (2.3)	26.9 (−2.8)	42.9 (6.1)
Source: PRISM

== Transportation ==
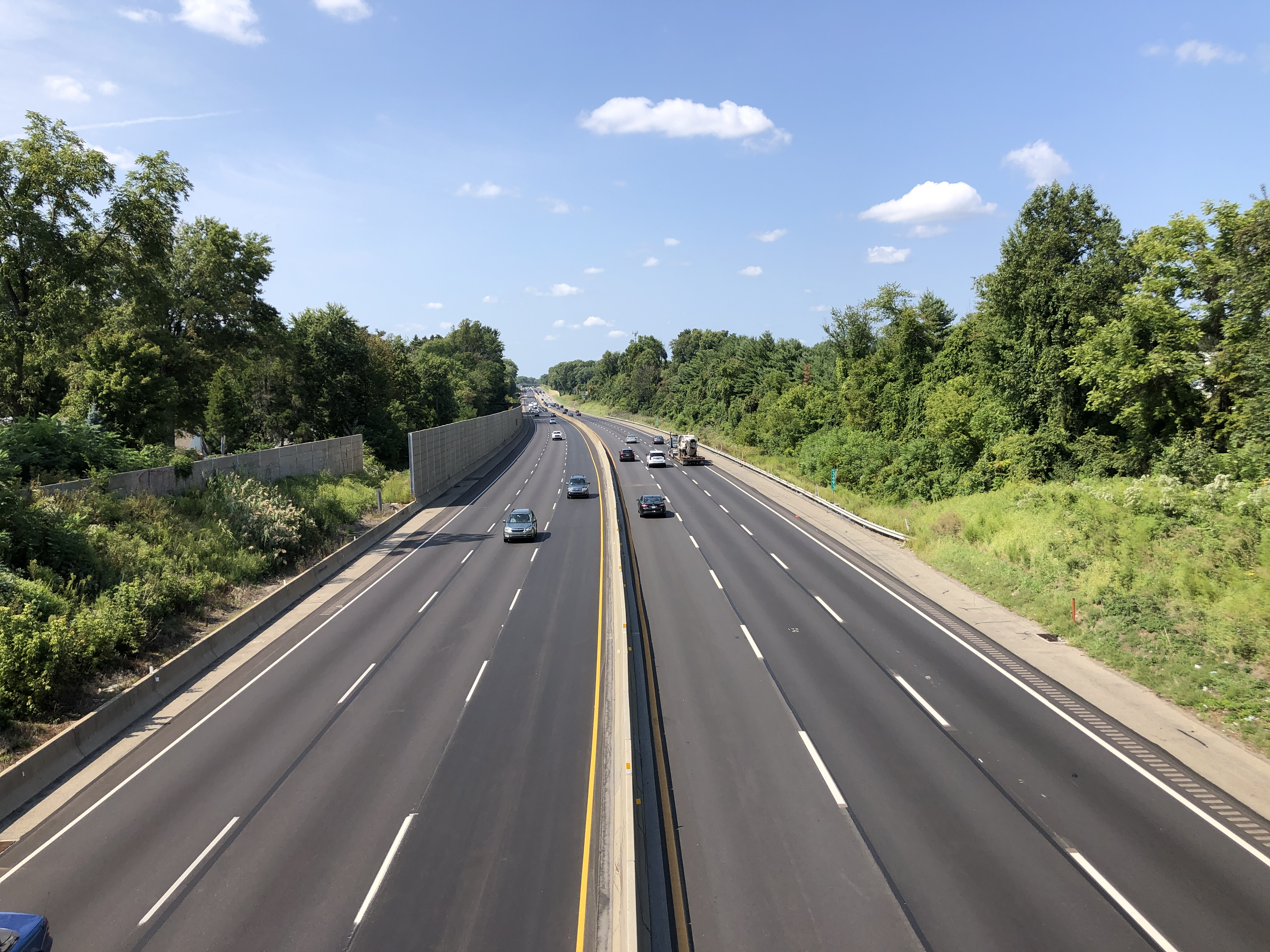
The Pennsylvania Turnpike/I-276 westbound in Lower Southampton Township

As of 2018 there were 85.29 miles (137.26 km) of public roads in Lower Southampton Township, of which 2.10 miles (3.38 km) were maintained by the Pennsylvania Turnpike Commission (PTC), 13.82 miles (22.24 km) were maintained by the Pennsylvania Department of Transportation (PennDOT) and 69.37 miles (111.64 km) were maintained by the township.

The Pennsylvania Turnpike (Interstate 276) passes east–west through Lower Southampton Township, but the nearest interchange is to the east in neighboring Bensalem Township. Numbered routes serving the township include Pennsylvania Route 132, which runs northwest–southeast through the township along Street Road; Pennsylvania Route 532, which runs north–south through the township along Bustleton Pike and Buck Road; and Pennsylvania Route 213, which begins at PA 532 in the township and heads northeast along Bridgetown Pike. Other important roads include County Line Road, which begins at PA 532 and heads northwest along the border separating Lower Southampton Township from Philadelphia and Montgomery County; Bustleton Pike, which follows PA 532 in the southern part of the township before splitting to the northwest; Philmont Avenue, which begins at PA 132 and heads southwest through the southern part of the township; Brownsville Road, which begins near PA 132 and heads northeast through the eastern part of the township; and Bristol Road, which runs northwest–southeast through the northern portion of the township, with a gap between PA 532 and PA 213.

SEPTA provides public transportation in Lower Southampton Township. SEPTA Regional Rail's West Trenton Line passes east–west through the southern portion of the township; the nearest stations are Somerton station in the Somerton neighborhood of Northeast Philadelphia and Trevose station and Neshaminy Falls station in Bensalem Township. SEPTA City Bus Route 58 serves the township along its route between the Neshaminy Mall and the Frankford Transportation Center in Northeast Philadelphia. Norfolk Southern Railway's Morrisville Line freight railroad line passes east–west through the northern part of Lower Southampton Township.

== Ecology ==
According to the A. W. Kuchler U.S. potential natural vegetation types, Lower Southampton Twp would have a dominant vegetation type of Appalachian Oak (104) with a dominant vegetation form of Eastern Hardwood Forest (25). The plant hardiness zone is 7a with an average annual extreme minimum air temperature of 1.1 °F (−17.2 °C). The spring bloom typically begins by April 8 and fall color usually peaks by November 3.

Preceded by Lower Moreland Township; Montgomery County	Bordering communities]] of Philadelphia	Succeeded by Bensalem
