= Neshaminy =

Neshaminy may refer to:

- Neshaminy Mall, a shopping mall in Bensalem, Pennsylvania
- Neshaminy Creek in Bucks County, Pennsylvania
- Neshaminy Falls, Pennsylvania
- Neshaminy Falls (SEPTA station)
- Neshaminy, Pennsylvania, a village of Warrington Township, Bucks County, Pennsylvania
- Neshaminy State Park, a landmark in Bensalem, Pennsylvania
- Neshaminy School District, a school district in Bucks County, Pennsylvania
- Neshaminy High School, a high school in the Neshaminy School District in Langhorne, Pennsylvania
- Neshaminy (screw frigate), a warship built by the U.S. Navy in 1865 but never commissioned or placed in service, renamed Arizona and then Nevada in 1869, sold in 1874
