= Bensalem Township, Pennsylvania =

Township in Pennsylvania, US

- Township
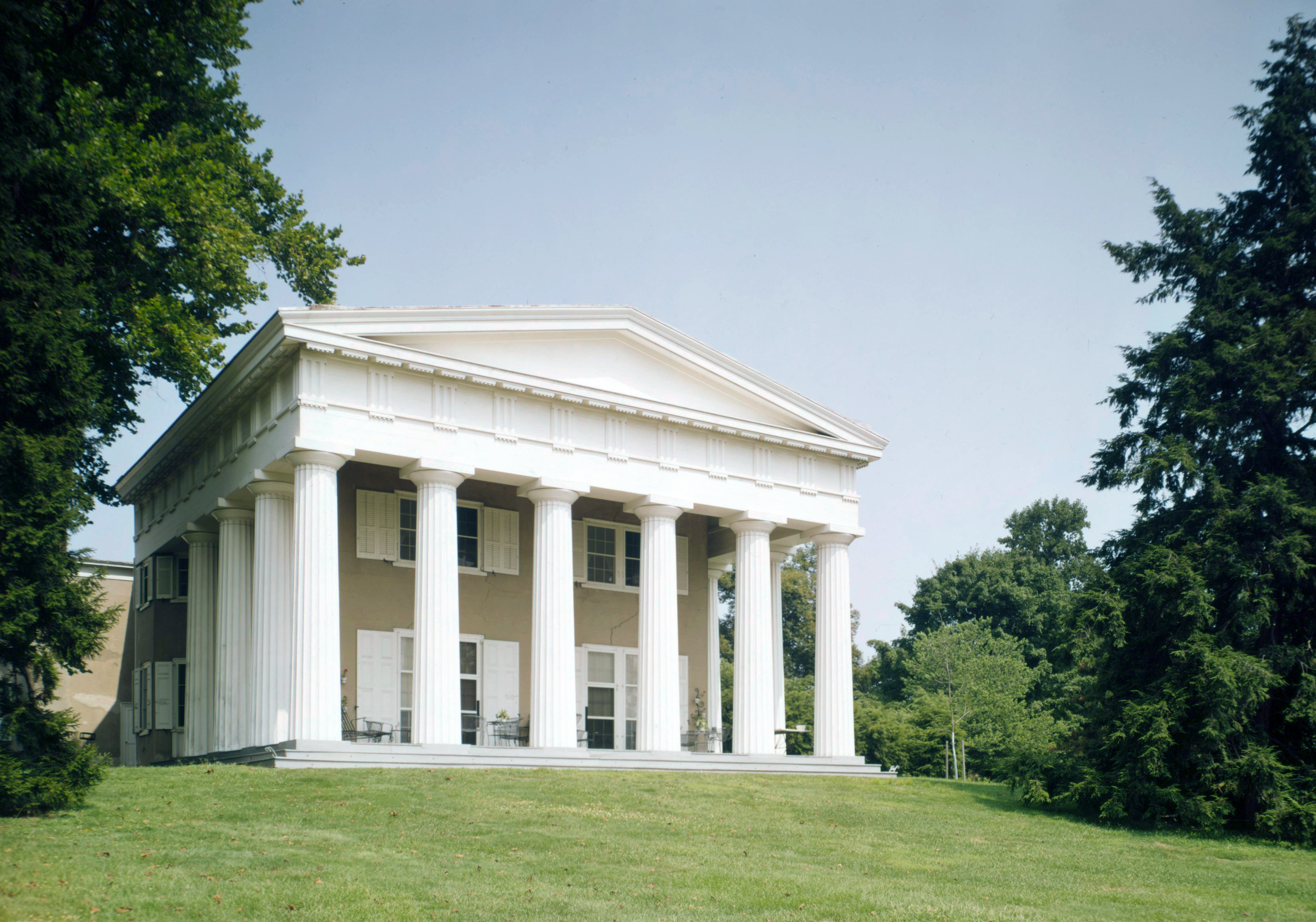
- Andalusia, an NRHP site in Bensalem

- Flag Seal

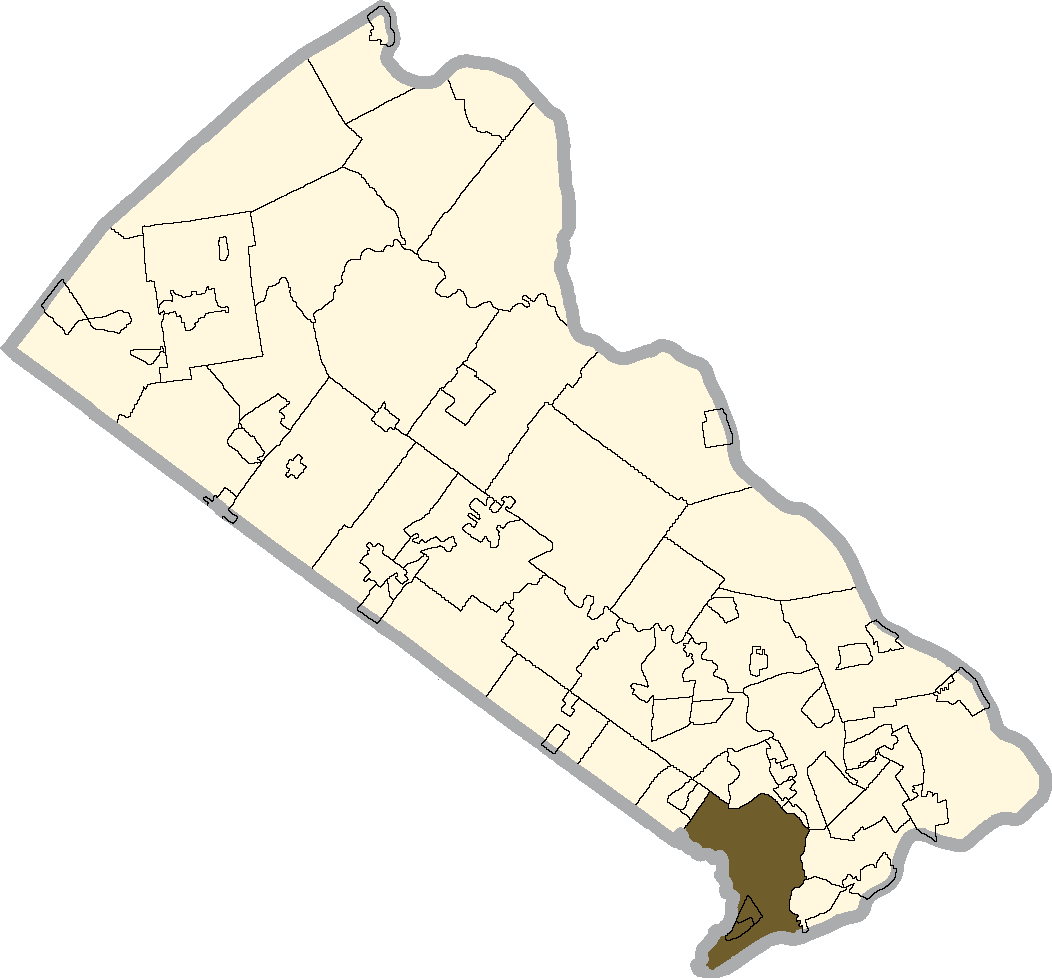
- Location of Bensalem Township in Bucks County, Pennsylvania

- Location of Bensalem in Pennsylvania Bensalem Township (the United States)
- Coordinates: 40°06′46″N 74°56′36″W
- Country: United States
- State: Pennsylvania
- County: Bucks

Government
  - Type: Mayor-council
  - Mayor: Joseph DiGirolamo (R)

Area
  - Total: 21.0 sq mi (54 km^{2})
  - Land: 20.0 sq mi (52 km^{2})
  - Water: 1.0 sq mi (2.6 km^{2})
- Elevation: 102 ft (31 m)

Population (2020)
  - Total: 62,707
  - Estimate (2022): 62,619
  - Density: 3,140/sq mi (1,210/km^{2})
- Time zone: UTC-5 (EST)
  - Summer (DST): UTC-4 (EDT)
- ZIP Codes: 19020, 19053
- Area codes: 215, 267, and 445
- FIPS code: 42-017-05616
- Website: https://www.bensalempa.gov/

Bensalem Township is a township in Bucks County, Pennsylvania, United States. The township borders the northeastern section of Philadelphia and includes the communities of Andalusia, Bensalem, Bridgewater, Cornwells Heights, Eddington, Flushing, Oakford, Siles, Trappe, and Trevose. Bensalem Township has no other incorporated municipalities within its boundaries. It is located within the Philadelphia metropolitan area.

As of the 2020 census, the township had a population of 62,707, which made it the most populous municipality in Bucks County and the ninth-most populated municipality in Pennsylvania.

The township, which was founded in 1692, is almost as old as Pennsylvania itself, which was founded in 1682.

== Origins ==
The origin of the name Bensalem likely comes from references made by settler Joseph Growden, who named his estate Manor of Bensalem in honor of William Penn and the Semitic term for peace, Salem. It was originally named Salem; the first syllable Ben was added in 1701. Another theory notes the shared name with the utopian island in Francis Bacon's New Atlantis, also named Bensalem.

== History ==
The area of Bensalem Township appeared on the Holme Map of 1682, though not yet with a name. On January 2, 1685, the boundary was fixed between Bensalem and Philadelphia County along the Poquessing Creek. At the September 1692 session of Bucks County Court, a jury of thirteen men was formed to define boundaries of divisions that had been created up to that time. The report submitted in December states that "All the lands between Neshamineh and Poquessin, and so to the upper side of Joseph Growden's land in one and to be called 'Salem.'"

The first name of the township was Salem. The minutes of the Board of Property of the Province on November 19, 1701, at Philadelphia noted the name of the area as Bensalem. The population of the area was first a few Dutch and Swedes, then later a larger influx of English, and then additional Dutch settled the area.

== Geography ==
Bensalem is the southernmost township in Bucks County and is bordered by the Northeast Philadelphia section of the city of Philadelphia to the west and south, Croydon and the rest of Bristol Township to the east and northeast, the borough of Hulmeville and Middletown Township to the north, and Feasterville, Trevose, and Oakford in Lower Southampton Township to the northwest. Across the Delaware River in Burlington County, New Jersey to the southeast, there are the city of Beverly, Delanco Township, and Edgewater Park Township.

According to the U.S. Census Bureau, the township has a total area of 21.0 square miles (54 km^{2}), of which 20.0 square miles (52 km^{2}) is land and 1.0 square mile (2.6 km^{2}) (4.77%) is water.

The Fall Line, which separates the Atlantic Coastal Plain region from the Piedmont region, passes through Bensalem, and is visible around the Neshaminy Mall area. The Neshaminy Creek forms the natural eastern boundary and Poquessing Creek forms the natural western boundary of the township.

Natural features include Barnsleys Ford, Mill Creek, Neshaminy Creek, Neshaminy Falls, Partridge Point, Poquessing Creek, and White Sheet Bay.

== Demographics ==
Historical population
| Census | Pop. | Note | %± |
|---|---|---|---|
| 1890 | 2,499 | | — |
| 1900 | 3,046 | | 21.9% |
| 1910 | 3,105 | | 1.9% |
| 1920 | 2,912 | | −6.2% |
| 1930 | 5,645 | | 93.9% |
| 1940 | 7,276 | | 28.9% |
| 1950 | 11,365 | | 56.2% |
| 1960 | 23,478 | | 106.6% |
| 1970 | 33,042 | | 40.7% |
| 1980 | 52,368 | | 58.5% |
| 1990 | 56,788 | | 8.4% |
| 2000 | 58,434 | | 2.9% |
| 2010 | 60,427 | | 3.4% |
| 2020 | 62,707 | | 3.8% |

As of the 2010 census, the township was 72.1% Non-Hispanic White, 7.3% Black or African American, 0.5% Native American, 10.2% Asian, and 2.6% of the population were of two or more races. 8.4% of the population were of Hispanic or Latino ancestry.

As of the census of 2000, there were 58,434 people, 22,627 households, and 15,114 families residing in the township. The population density was 2,926.7 inhabitants per square mile (1,130.0/km^{2}). There were 23,535 housing units at an average density of 1,178.8 per square mile (455.1/km^{2}).

There were 22,627 households, of which 30.6% had children under the age of 18 living with them, 51.6% were married couples living together, 10.5% had a female householder with no husband present, and 33.2% were non-families. 26.3% of all households were made up of individuals, and 7.9% had someone living alone who was 65 years of age or older. The average household size was 2.56 and the average family size was 3.14.

In the township the population was spread out, with 23.1% under the age of 18, 8.9% from 18 to 24, 32.5% from 25 to 44, 24.5% from 45 to 64, and 11.0% who were 65 years of age or older. The median age was 36 years. For every 100 females, there were 99.0 males. For every 100 women age 18 and over, there were 96.9 men.

The median income for a household in the township was $49,737, and the median income for a family was $58,771. Men had a median income of $39,914 versus $30,926 for women. The per capita income for the township was $22,517. 7.4% of the population and 6.0% of families were below the poverty line. Of the total population, 6.8% of those under the age of 18 and 10.6% of those 65 and older were living below the poverty line.

Bensalem, Pennsylvania – Racial and ethnic composition Note: the US Census treats Hispanic/Latino as an ethnic category. This table excludes Latinos from the racial categories and assigns them to a separate category. Hispanics/Latinos may be of any race.
| Race / Ethnicity (NH = Non-Hispanic) | Pop 1990 | Pop 2000 | Pop 2010 | Pop 2020 | % 1990 | % 2000 | % 2010 | % 2020 |
|---|---|---|---|---|---|---|---|---|
| White alone (NH) | 49,718 | 47,165 | 43,561 | 40,007 | 87.55% | 80.7% | 72.09% | 63.80% |
| Black or African American alone (NH) | 3,807 | 3,937 | 4,240 | 4,578 | 6.70% | 6.74% | 7.02% | 7.30% |
| Native American or Alaska Native alone (NH) | 199 | 113 | 108 | 125 | 0.35% | 0.19% | 0.18% | 0.20% |
| Asian alone (NH) | 1,887 | 3,846 | 6,150 | 8,591 | 3.32% | 6.58% | 10.18% | 13.7% |
| Pacific Islander alone (NH) | 1,887 | 22 | 8 | 10 | 3.32% | 0.00% | 0.00% | 0.00% |
| Other race alone (NH) | 20 | 62 | 102 | 5,330 | 0.00% | 0.11% | 0.17% | 8.50% |
| Mixed race or Multiracial (NH) | 20 | 784 | 1,167 | 5,330 | 0.00% | 1.34% | 1.93% | 8.50% |
| Hispanic or Latino (any race) | 1,157 | 2,505 | 5,091 | 8,591 | 2.03% | 4.29% | 8.43% | 13.70% |
| Total | 56,788 | 58,434 | 60,427 | 62,707 | 100.00% | 100.00% | 100.00% | 100.00% |

=== Indian population ===
The population of Bensalem originating from the Indian subcontinent has drastically increased in the past 20 years. Although quite meager at the turn of the 21st century, as of 2025, an estimated 13% of the township's population is Indian.

=== Jewish community ===
Bensalem has a significant Jewish community, with the following institutions.

- The Bensalem Jewish Outreach Center, an Orthodox Judaism outreach institution with associated synagogue Kehillas B'nai Shalom.
- Congregation Tifereth Israel, a Conservative synagogue.

== Public safety ==
In the last decade, numerous homicides have made national headlines. Long-time residents claim that the high crime rate is due to Parx Casino which brings in a plethora of non-residents, in addition to its shared border with Philadelphia. Neighborhoods of concern include Calico Corner (Nottingham), and "Top of The Ridge Trailer Park", which has seen its fair share of crimes and homicides.

In 2022 Bensalem once again made national headlines; after a violent brawl broke out in a local Golden Corral restaurant over a single piece of steak. In total, the altercation involved over 40 people. This incident destroyed the interior of the restaurant causing it to temporarily close down.

== Landmarks and attractions ==
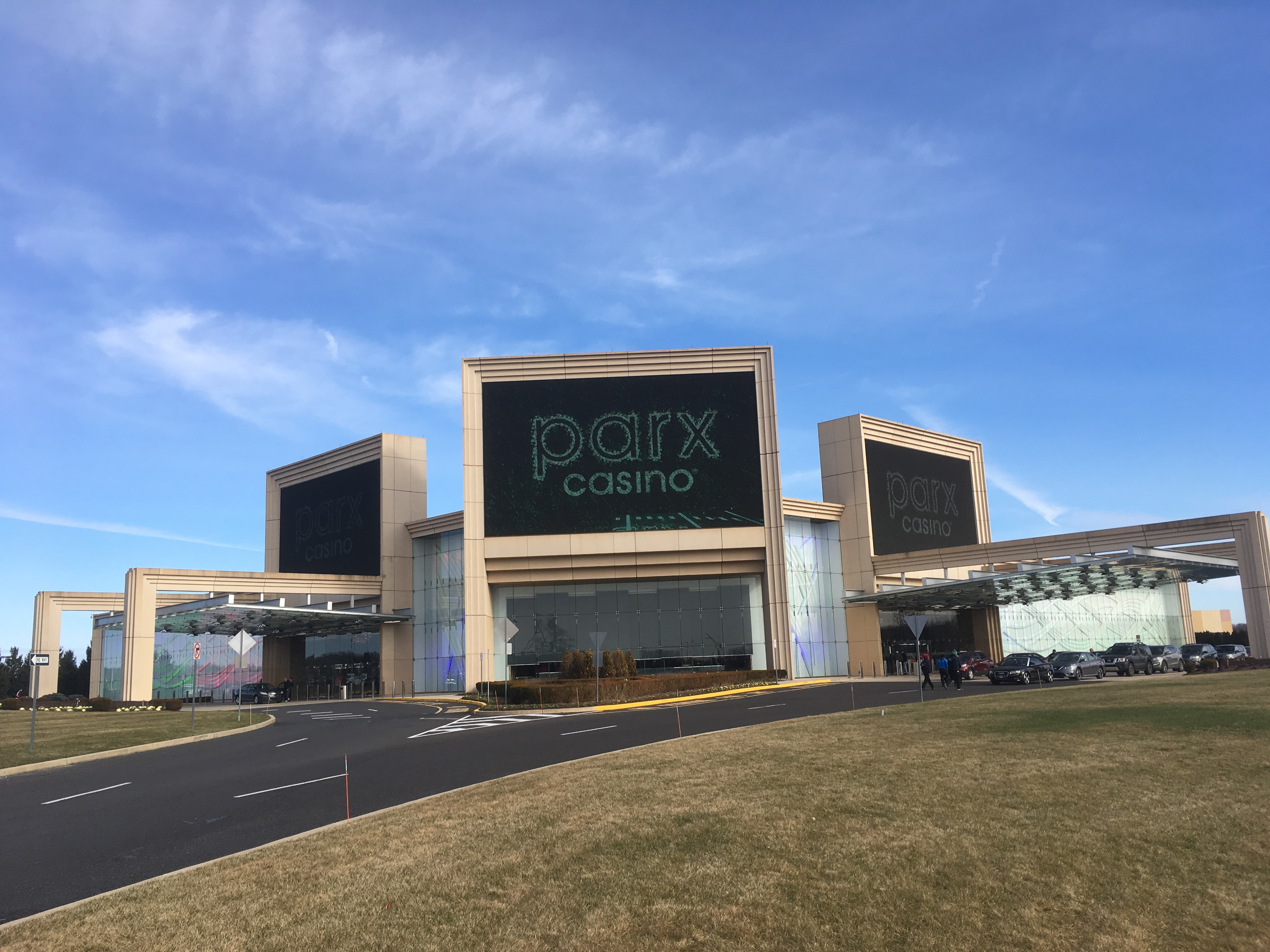
Parx Casino

Bensalem is home to Parx Casino and Racing, a 1-mile (1.6 km) thoroughbred horse racing track and casino. This facility opened in November 1974 as Keystone Racetrack. The name was changed to Philadelphia Park in 1984. The track became notable as the original home of 2004 Kentucky Derby and Preakness Stakes champion Smarty Jones, who placed second in the Belmont Stakes, narrowly missing the Triple Crown. In 2006, a slots parlor casino opened at Philadelphia Park and the facility was renamed to Philadelphia Park Racetrack and Casino. A permanent standalone casino structure opened in December 2009 and was renamed Parx Casino. The facility boasts 260,000 square feet (24,000 m^{2}) including gaming, dining, entertainment, and banquet space. Parx Casino contains the Xcite Center, which hosts concerts, entertainment performances, comedy acts, and boxing and MMA matches.

Penn Community Bank Amphitheater is located in Bensalem, and is a popular venue for concerts.

Bensalem is also home to the Mongkoltepmunee Buddhist Temple, or Wat Mongkoltepmunee, on Knights Road. This shrine is an exact replica of a temple in Bangkok and is the only one of its kind in the United States. It serves as a place of high ceremonies and meditation for a community of Buddhist monks who came to Bensalem from Thailand in the 1980s.

For the 2002 M. Night Shyamalan movie Signs, starring Mel Gibson, a stage set was built inside a warehouse on State Road for many of the interior shots.

The NBC pilot episode for Outlaw, starring Jimmy Smits filmed scenes in Andalusia March 22–23, 2010.

The movie Safe, starring Jason Statham filmed a scene at Parx Casino and Racing.

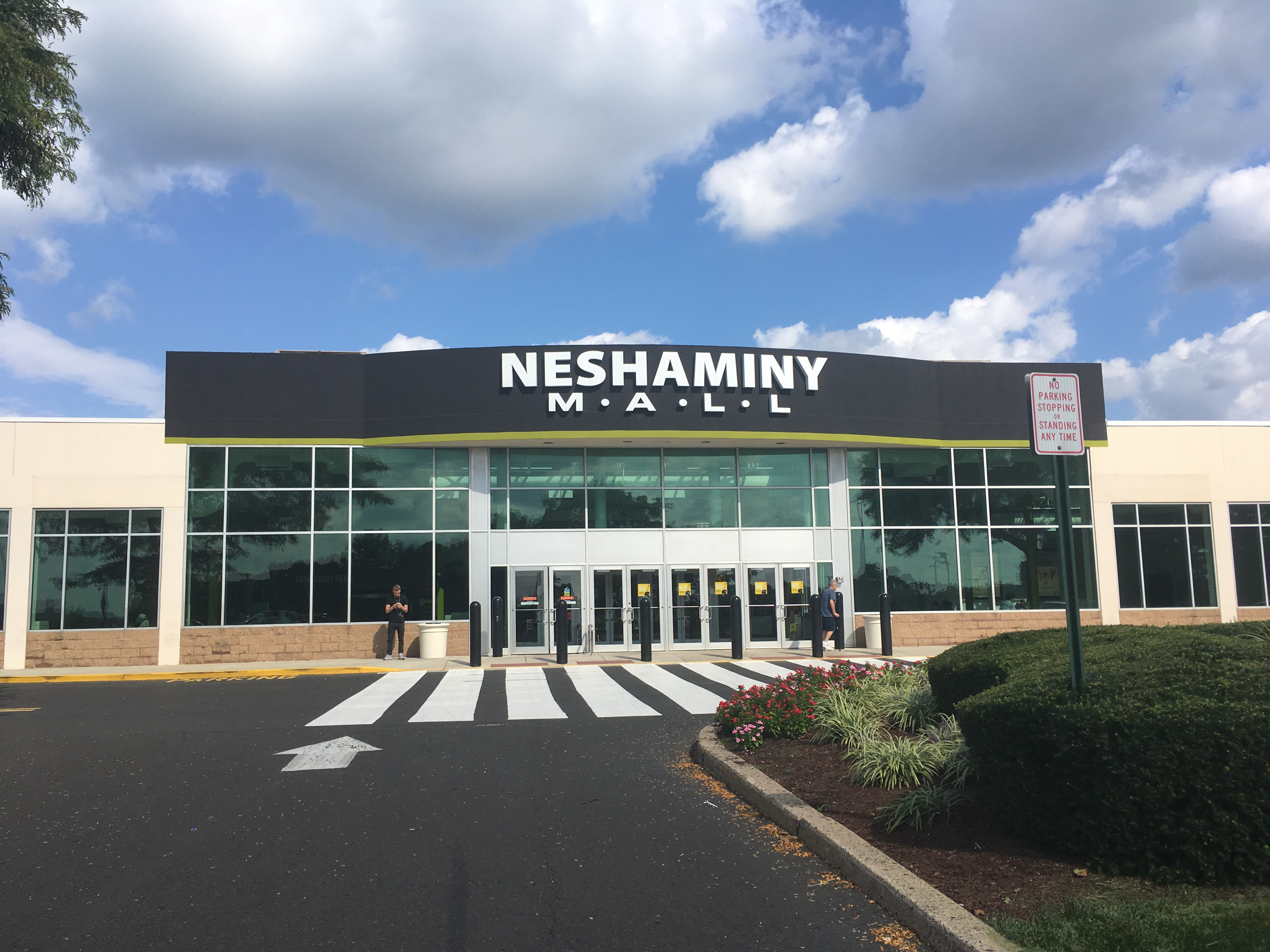
Neshaminy Mall

The Neshaminy Mall is located within Bensalem. It was one of the first malls to be constructed in the country in 1968. It has two main anchors (Boscov's and AMC Theatres) and over 40 smaller shops and eateries, with many vacant stores. The AMC Neshaminy 24 Theater is the largest and highest sales-producing theater in Pennsylvania. In addition, it has on many occasions been a top 10 for theater engagements in the United States (including the opening of Signs where it was #1).

Benjamin Franklin would often travel to Bensalem to visit his friend, Joseph Galloway, at Growden Mansion. At the time, the Galloway family owned all of present-day Bensalem Township. A local legend maintains that Franklin performed his famous kite-flying experiment in Bensalem, at the mansion, to prove that lightning was the same as static electricity. (The broader consensus is that Benjamin Franklin flew his kite closer to his home in Philadelphia.)

Bensalem is home to the Philadelphia Gun Club, which hosts one of the few trap pigeon shoots in the United States. Live birds are released from boxes called traps and then shot by club members. Many birds are not killed outright and are collected to be killed by hand.

Andalusia and Belmont are listed on the National Register of Historic Places. Andalusia is also designated a National Historic Landmark.

The U.S. subsidiary of Hoshino, which manufactures Tama Drums and Ibanez guitars, is located here.

Bensalem is home to Neshaminy State Park. Also, in the center of Bensalem is the Bensalem Township Community Park, which features a skatepark, playground, basketball courts, a roller-hockey rink, and baseball, football, soccer, and softball fields.

== Infrastructure ==
=== Transportation ===
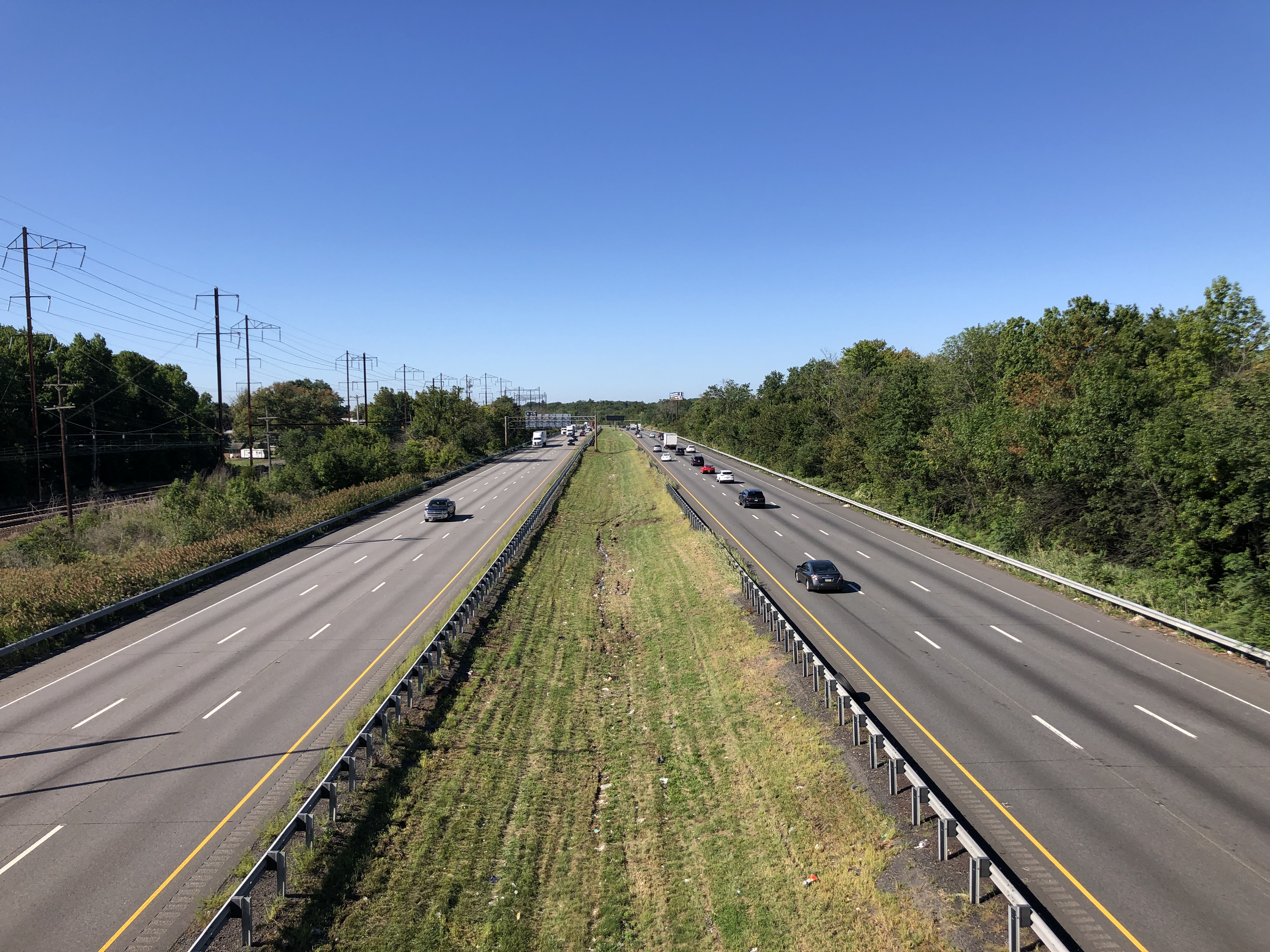
I-95 southbound in Bensalem Township

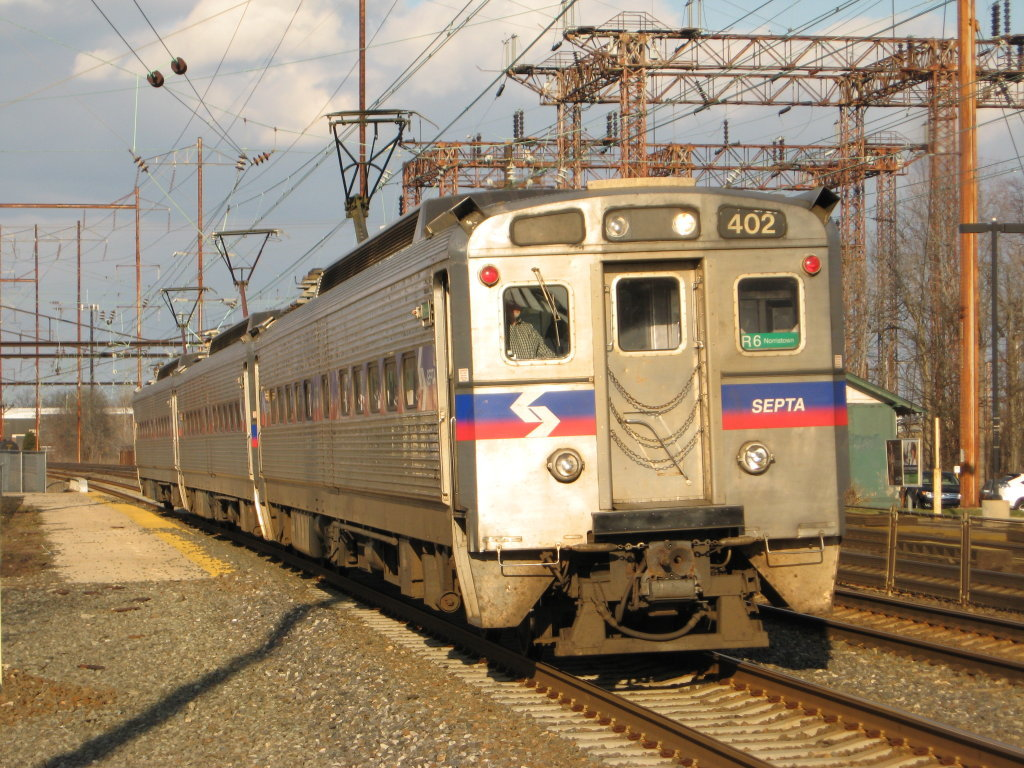
A SEPTA Regional Rail train along the Trenton Line entering the Cornwells Heights station

As of 2018 there were 195.30 miles (314.30 km) of public roads in Bensalem Township, of which 4.80 miles (7.72 km) were maintained by the Pennsylvania Turnpike Commission (PTC), 45.89 miles (73.85 km) were maintained by the Pennsylvania Department of Transportation (PennDOT) and 144.61 miles (232.73 km) were maintained by the township.

Bensalem Township is readily accessible with Interstate 95, Pennsylvania Turnpike (Interstate 276), U.S. Route 1, U.S. Route 13 (Bristol Pike), Pennsylvania Route 63 (Woodhaven Road), Pennsylvania Route 132 (Street Road), and Pennsylvania Route 513 (Hulmeville Road) all passing through. The Bensalem (formerly Philadelphia) Interchange of the Pennsylvania Turnpike (exit 351, at U.S. Route 1) is in the Trevose section of the township. In addition, the eastbound Street Road interchange of the Pennsylvania Turnpike (exit 352), which is E-ZPass only, serves Bensalem. The eastern terminus of the ticket system along the turnpike is located at the Neshaminy Falls toll plaza, east of the Street Road interchange. The intersection of Knights and Street roads in Bensalem Township was ranked by Time magazine as the most dangerous intersection in the United States from 2003 until 2012.

Two SEPTA Regional Rail lines serve Bensalem Township, providing service to Center City Philadelphia. The West Trenton Line stops at the Trevose and Neshaminy Falls stations in the northern part of the township. The Trenton Line stops at the Cornwells Heights and Eddington stations in the southern part of the township. The Cornwells Heights station is also served by Amtrak's Keystone Service and Northeast Regional services along the Northeast Corridor and has a park-and-ride with access from Interstate 95 and Pennsylvania Route 63. CSX Transportation's Trenton Subdivision freight railroad line runs through the northern portion of the township. Multiple SEPTA bus routes pass through the township, serving points of interest within the township and providing connections to Philadelphia and other suburbs. Bus routes serving Bensalem Township include SEPTA City Bus Routes 1, 14, 20, 50, and 58 and SEPTA Suburban Bus Routes 128, 129, 130, 133, and 150. SEPTA also operates the Boulevard Direct, a limited-stop bus route between the Neshaminy Mall in Bensalem Township and the Frankford Transportation Center in Northeast Philadelphia that follows Roosevelt Boulevard through Northeast Philadelphia. The Delaware River passes along the southeastern border of Bensalem Township and provides access for shipping. The Northeast Philadelphia Airport, located a couple miles away, provides general aviation services. The Philadelphia International Airport is 25 miles (40 km) away, offering flights to domestic and international destinations.

=== Utilities ===
Electricity and natural gas in Bensalem Township is provided by PECO Energy Company, a subsidiary of Exelon. Water in the township is provided by Aqua Pennsylvania, a subsidiary of Aqua America, while sewer service is provided by the Bucks County Water & Sewer Authority; Bensalem sold off its water and sewer system in 1999. Trash and recycling collection is provided by private haulers. Cable, telephone, and internet service to the area is provided by Xfinity and Verizon. Bensalem Township is served by area codes 215, 267, and 445.

== Government ==
In 1987, the people of Bensalem voted to become a second-class township with a mayor-council form of government consisting of a five-member council and a mayor. The mayor is allowed to serve unlimited terms. The first mayor of Bensalem was Ed Burns, who was elected on 1989 and served in office from 1990 to 1994. The current mayor is Republican Joseph DiGirolamo, who is in his ninth consecutive term. He was elected mayor in 1994.

== Education ==
Public schools in Bensalem are operated by the Bensalem Township School District. The school district consists of six elementary schools, two middle schools, and Bensalem High School. The township has its own nine-member school board. Holy Ghost Preparatory School is a private Catholic high school located in the township.

Founded in 1969, Roman Catholic Saint Ephrem School serving Grades Pre-K to 8 has students from Bensalem and the surrounding area.

Established 1920, and located in the Cornwells Heights section of Bensalem, St. Charles Borromeo School is a Catholic, MSA Accredited, modernized Elementary School serving Grades Pre-K to 8.

The Roman Catholic Archdiocese of Philadelphia announced in 2011 that Our Lady of Fatima School was closing as the number of students had declined.

== Economy ==
Rita's Franchise Company, LLC has its headquarters in the Trevose section of the township, as well as its first location in the Andalusia section. Philly Pretzel Factory has its headquarters in Bensalem. Fortune 1000 company Healthcare Services Group has its headquarters in Bensalem and is ranked #985 on the 2019 list.

Former Fortune 1000 company Charming Shoppes had its headquarters in Bensalem, and was ranked #927 on the 2012 list.

The US Headquarters for Ibanez Guitars and Tama Drums is located in Bensalem Township.

Suez Water Technologies & Solutions is a water treatment company based in the Trevose section of Bensalem Township.

== Climate ==
According to the Köppen climate classification system, Bensalem Township has a Humid subtropical climate (Cfa). Cfa climates are characterized by all months having an average mean temperature > 32.0 °F (0.0 °C), at least four months with an average mean temperature ≥ 50.0 °F (10.0 °C), at least one month with an average mean temperature ≥ 71.6 °F (22.0 °C) and no significant precipitation difference between seasons. Although most summer days are slightly humid in Bensalem Township, episodes of heat and high humidity can occur with heat index values > 108 °F (42 °C). Since 1981, the highest air temperature was 103.0 °F (39.4 °C) on July 22, 2011, and the highest daily average mean dew point was 76.2 °F (24.6 °C) on August 13, 1999. The average wettest month is July which corresponds with the annual peak in thunderstorm activity. Since 1981, the wettest calendar day was 6.70 inches (170 mm) on August 27, 2011. During the winter months, the average annual extreme minimum air temperature is 1.9 °F (−16.7 °C). Since 1981, the coldest air temperature was −8.8 °F (−22.7 °C) on January 22, 1984. Episodes of extreme cold and wind can occur with wind chill values < −8 °F (−22 °C). The average annual snowfall (Nov-Apr) is between 24 inches (61 cm) and 30 inches (76 cm). Ice storms and large snowstorms depositing ≥ 12 inches (30 cm) occur once every few years, particularly during nor’easters from December through February.

Climate data for Bensalem Township, Pennsylvania (Neshaminy Falls) 1991–2020 normals, extremes 1915–present
| Month | Jan | Feb | Mar | Apr | May | Jun | Jul | Aug | Sep | Oct | Nov | Dec | Year |
|---|---|---|---|---|---|---|---|---|---|---|---|---|---|
| Record high °F (°C) | 74 (23) | 79 (26) | 88 (31) | 95 (35) | 97 (36) | 102 (39) | 105 (41) | 102 (39) | 98 (37) | 95 (35) | 88 (31) | 76 (24) | 105 (41) |
| Mean daily maximum °F (°C) | 39.4 (4.1) | 42.2 (5.7) | 50.5 (10.3) | 62.5 (16.9) | 72.3 (22.4) | 81.1 (27.3) | 85.8 (29.9) | 84.0 (28.9) | 77.4 (25.2) | 65.6 (18.7) | 54.6 (12.6) | 44.4 (6.9) | 63.3 (17.4) |
| Daily mean °F (°C) | 30.4 (−0.9) | 32.4 (0.2) | 40.0 (4.4) | 51.0 (10.6) | 60.9 (16.1) | 70.5 (21.4) | 75.5 (24.2) | 73.8 (23.2) | 66.6 (19.2) | 54.6 (12.6) | 43.9 (6.6) | 35.4 (1.9) | 52.9 (11.6) |
| Mean daily minimum °F (°C) | 21.5 (−5.8) | 22.6 (−5.2) | 29.4 (−1.4) | 39.5 (4.2) | 49.5 (9.7) | 59.8 (15.4) | 65.2 (18.4) | 63.5 (17.5) | 55.7 (13.2) | 43.5 (6.4) | 33.2 (0.7) | 26.5 (−3.1) | 42.5 (5.8) |
| Record low °F (°C) | −18 (−28) | −18 (−28) | −2 (−19) | 8 (−13) | 29 (−2) | 34 (1) | 43 (6) | 35 (2) | 30 (−1) | 19 (−7) | −3 (−19) | −10 (−23) | −18 (−28) |
| Average precipitation inches (mm) | 3.69 (94) | 3.06 (78) | 4.58 (116) | 3.97 (101) | 4.00 (102) | 4.58 (116) | 4.94 (125) | 4.67 (119) | 4.72 (120) | 4.21 (107) | 3.63 (92) | 4.65 (118) | 50.70 (1,288) |
| Average snowfall inches (cm) | 7.0 (18) | 5.7 (14) | 3.5 (8.9) | 0.0 (0.0) | 0.0 (0.0) | 0.0 (0.0) | 0.0 (0.0) | 0.0 (0.0) | 0.0 (0.0) | 0.1 (0.25) | 0.2 (0.51) | 3.4 (8.6) | 19.9 (51) |
| Average precipitation days (≥ 0.01 in) | 10.5 | 9.9 | 10.7 | 10.7 | 11.3 | 10.5 | 10.0 | 9.0 | 8.6 | 9.3 | 8.7 | 10.6 | 119.8 |
| Average snowy days (≥ 0.1 in) | 2.3 | 1.9 | 1.2 | 0.0 | 0.0 | 0.0 | 0.0 | 0.0 | 0.0 | 0.1 | 0.1 | 1.2 | 6.8 |
Source: NOAA

Climate data for Andalusia, Bensalem Twp. Elevation: 16 ft (5 m). 1981-2010 Averages (1981-2018 Records)
| Month | Jan | Feb | Mar | Apr | May | Jun | Jul | Aug | Sep | Oct | Nov | Dec | Year |
|---|---|---|---|---|---|---|---|---|---|---|---|---|---|
| Record high °F (°C) | 72.5 (22.5) | 78.7 (25.9) | 87.7 (30.9) | 94.1 (34.5) | 96.1 (35.6) | 97.5 (36.4) | 103.5 (39.7) | 101.3 (38.5) | 99.1 (37.3) | 89.6 (32.0) | 81.8 (27.7) | 76.6 (24.8) | 103.5 (39.7) |
| Mean daily maximum °F (°C) | 41.0 (5.0) | 44.4 (6.9) | 52.6 (11.4) | 63.9 (17.7) | 73.7 (23.2) | 82.9 (28.3) | 86.9 (30.5) | 85.5 (29.7) | 78.7 (25.9) | 67.3 (19.6) | 56.4 (13.6) | 45.4 (7.4) | 65.0 (18.3) |
| Daily mean °F (°C) | 33.4 (0.8) | 36.0 (2.2) | 43.3 (6.3) | 53.8 (12.1) | 63.3 (17.4) | 72.8 (22.7) | 77.4 (25.2) | 76.0 (24.4) | 68.9 (20.5) | 57.3 (14.1) | 47.6 (8.7) | 37.8 (3.2) | 55.7 (13.2) |
| Mean daily minimum °F (°C) | 25.6 (−3.6) | 27.6 (−2.4) | 34.1 (1.2) | 43.6 (6.4) | 52.9 (11.6) | 62.7 (17.1) | 67.8 (19.9) | 66.4 (19.1) | 59.1 (15.1) | 47.3 (8.5) | 38.9 (3.8) | 30.3 (−0.9) | 46.4 (8.0) |
| Record low °F (°C) | −7.4 (−21.9) | −0.6 (−18.1) | 5.7 (−14.6) | 19.5 (−6.9) | 35.2 (1.8) | 44.4 (6.9) | 51.0 (10.6) | 45.4 (7.4) | 38.8 (3.8) | 27.6 (−2.4) | 15.0 (−9.4) | 1.6 (−16.9) | −7.4 (−21.9) |
| Average precipitation inches (mm) | 3.52 (89) | 2.73 (69) | 4.23 (107) | 3.88 (99) | 4.20 (107) | 4.18 (106) | 4.97 (126) | 4.34 (110) | 4.14 (105) | 3.71 (94) | 3.46 (88) | 3.93 (100) | 47.29 (1,201) |
| Average relative humidity (%) | 64.2 | 60.9 | 56.1 | 56.5 | 60.7 | 62.8 | 64.1 | 66.2 | 66.8 | 66.9 | 65.5 | 66.4 | 63.1 |
| Average dew point °F (°C) | 22.6 (−5.2) | 23.8 (−4.6) | 28.7 (−1.8) | 38.7 (3.7) | 49.5 (9.7) | 59.4 (15.2) | 64.3 (17.9) | 63.9 (17.7) | 57.4 (14.1) | 46.4 (8.0) | 36.6 (2.6) | 27.6 (−2.4) | 43.3 (6.3) |
Source: PRISM

== Ecology ==
According to the A. W. Kuchler U.S. potential natural vegetation types, Bensalem Township would have a dominant vegetation type of Appalachian Oak (104) with a dominant vegetation form of Eastern Hardwood Forest (25). The plant hardiness zone is 7a with an average annual extreme minimum air temperature of 1.9 °F (−16.7 °C). The spring bloom typically begins by April 7 and fall color usually peaks by November 5.

== Notable people ==
- Katharine Drexel, educator and philanthropist venerated as a saint in the Catholic Church
- Arthur Donaldson Smith (1866–1939), explorer of East Africa
- Nancy Spungen, girlfriend of punk rock musician Sid Vicious who died of mysterious circumstances in 1978 at age 20, is interred at King David Memorial Park, a Jewish cemetery in the township

| Preceded by Lower Southampton Township | Bordering communities of Philadelphia | Succeeded by Delanco Township, New Jersey; Burlington County |
