= Feasterville, Pennsylvania =

Unincorporated community in Pennsylvania, US

- Census-designated place
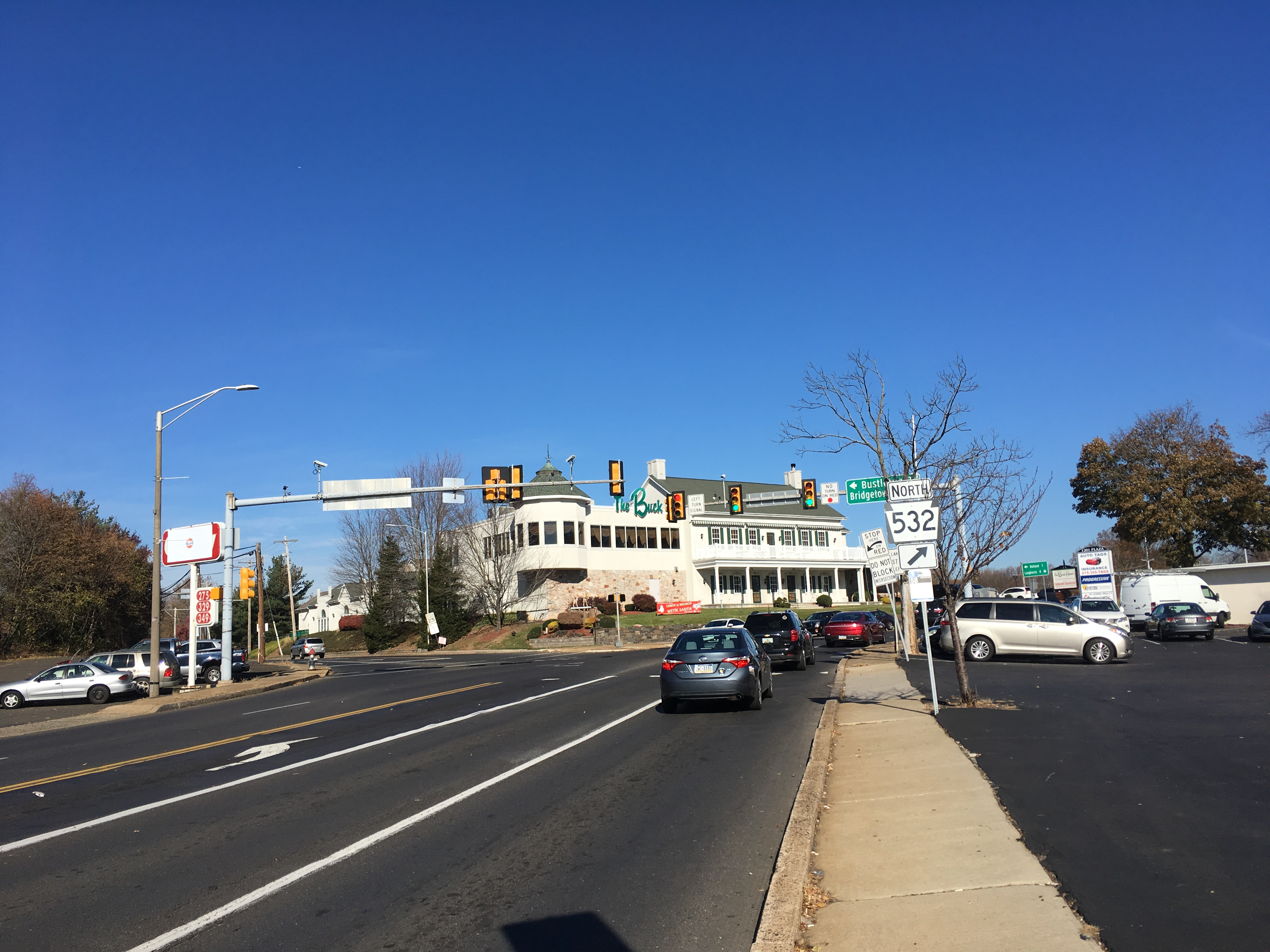
- Intersection of Bustleton Pike and Bridgetown Pike in Feasterville

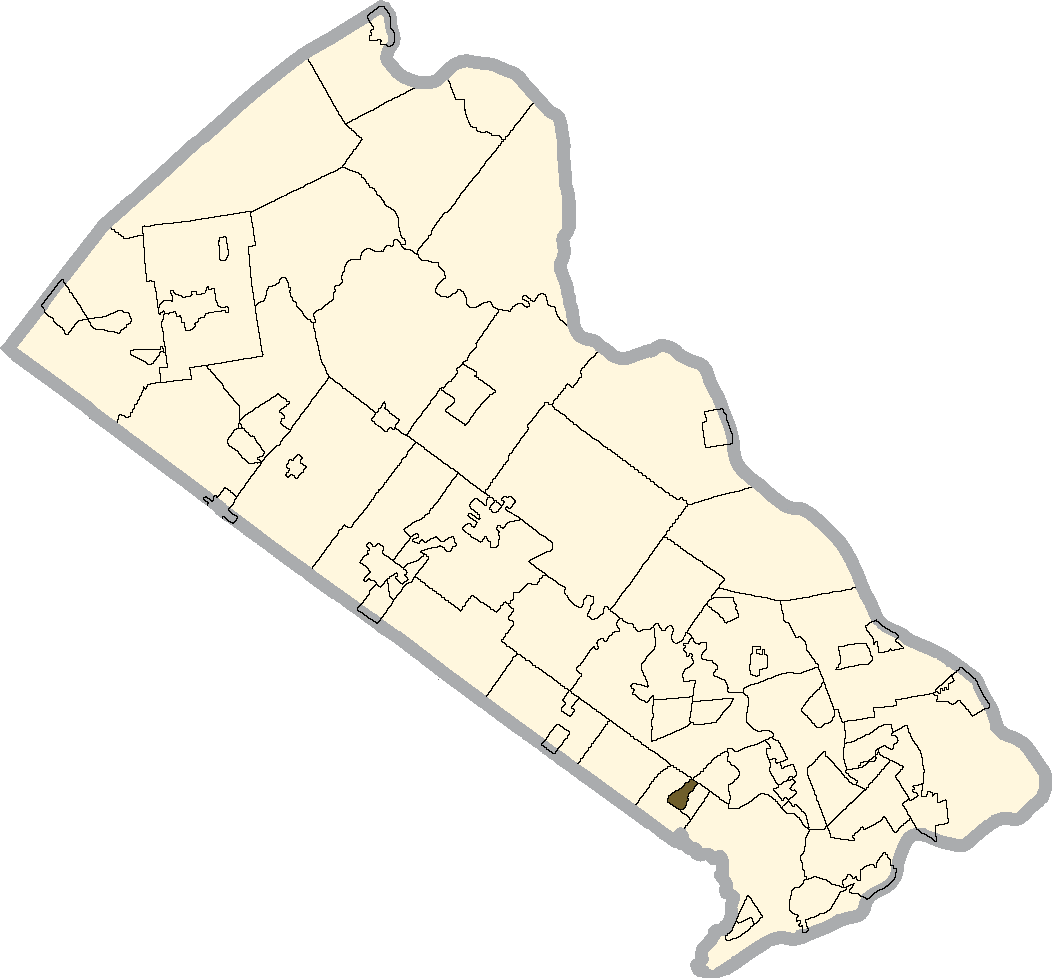
- Location of Feasterville in Bucks County

- Location of Feasterville in Pennsylvania Feasterville (the United States)
- Coordinates: 40°08′38″N 75°00′19″W
- Country: United States
- State: Pennsylvania
- County: Bucks
- Township: Lower Southampton

Area
  - Total: 0.64 sq mi (1.67 km^{2})
  - Land: 0.64 sq mi (1.67 km^{2})
  - Water: 0 sq mi (0.00 km^{2})
- Elevation: 220 ft (67 m)

Population (2020)
  - Total: 3,066
  - Density: 4,764.7/sq mi (1,839.68/km^{2})
- Time zone: UTC-5 (Eastern (EST))
  - Summer (DST): UTC-4 (EDT)
- ZIP code: 19053 reserved exclusively for Feasterville-Trevose
- Area codes: 215, 267 and 445
- GNIS feature ID: 1192454

Feasterville is a census-designated place located in Lower Southampton Township, Bucks County, Pennsylvania, United States. The community was part of Feasterville-Trevose, which was split into two separate CDPs, the other being Trevose. As of the 2010 census, the population was 3,074. Feasterville has grown by 2.02% since 2006.

== Demographics ==
Historical population
Census	Pop.	Note	%±
2020	3,066		—
U.S. Decennial Census

=== 2020 census ===
As of the 2020 census, Feasterville had a population of 3,066. The median age was 38.7 years. 23.1% of residents were under the age of 18 and 13.8% of residents were 65 years of age or older. For every 100 females there were 99.7 males, and for every 100 females age 18 and over there were 98.4 males age 18 and over.

100.0% of residents lived in urban areas, while 0.0% lived in rural areas.

There were 1,193 households in Feasterville, of which 35.2% had children under the age of 18 living in them. Of all households, 48.3% were married-couple households, 20.1% were households with a male householder and no spouse or partner present, and 26.0% were households with a female householder and no spouse or partner present. About 25.1% of all households were made up of individuals and 9.3% had someone living alone who was 65 years of age or older.

There were 1,217 housing units, of which 2.0% were vacant. The homeowner vacancy rate was 0.0% and the rental vacancy rate was 1.8%.

Racial composition as of the 2020 census
Race	Number	Percent
White	2,580	84.1%
Black or African American	87	2.8%
American Indian and Alaska Native	8	0.3%
Asian	161	5.3%
Native Hawaiian and Other Pacific Islander	1	0.0%
Some other race	39	1.3%
Two or more races	190	6.2%
Hispanic or Latino (of any race)	163	5.3%

=== Demographic estimates ===
In 2014, 17.94% of the population were foreign born, including a large Russian population.

== Education ==
Lower Southampton Township lies within the Neshaminy School District. Public school students within township boundaries may attend Joseph Ferderbar Elementary School or Tawanka Elementary School for grades K-4, depending on where they live. Poquessing Middle School serves students in grades 5–8, and Neshaminy High School serves students in grades 9–12.

St. Katharine Drexel Regional Catholic School in Holland is the local Catholic grade school. In 2012 Assumption B.V.M. Catholic School in Feasterville merged with St. Bede the Venerable School in Holland to form St. Katharine Drexel.

== Climate ==
According to the Köppen climate classification system, Feasterville has a Hot-summer Humid continental climate (Dfa). Dfa climates are characterized by at least one month having an average mean temperature ≤ 32.0 °F (0.0 °C), at least four months with an average mean temperature ≥ 50.0 °F (10.0 °C), at least one month with an average mean temperature ≥ 71.6 °F (22.0 °C) and no significant precipitation difference between seasons. Although most summer days are slightly humid in Feasterville, episodes of heat and high humidity can occur with heat index values > 108 °F (42 °C). Since 1981, the highest air temperature was 102.9 °F (39.4 °C) on July 22, 2011, and the highest daily average mean dew point was 76.2 °F (24.6 °C) on August 13, 1999. The average wettest month is July which correlates with the peak in thunderstorm activity. Since 1981, the wettest calendar day was 6.73 inches (171 mm) on August 27, 2011. During the winter months, the average annual extreme minimum air temperature is 1.2 °F (−17.1 °C). Since 1981, the coldest air temperature was −9.2 °F (−22.9 °C) on January 22, 1984. Episodes of extreme cold and wind can occur with wind chill values < −9 °F (−23 °C). The average annual snowfall (Nov-Apr) is 25.1 inches (64 cm). Ice storms and large snowstorms depositing ≥ 12 inches (30 cm) occur once every few years, particularly during nor’easters from December through February.

Climate data for Feasterville. Elevation: 213 feet (65 m), 1981–2010 normals, extremes 1981–2019
Month	Jan	Feb	Mar	Apr	May	Jun	Jul	Aug	Sep	Oct	Nov	Dec	Year
Record high °F (°C)	71.6 (22.0)	77.9 (25.5)	87.3 (30.7)	94.2 (34.6)	95.4 (35.2)	96.5 (35.8)	102.9 (39.4)	100.5 (38.1)	98.3 (36.8)	93.7 (34.3)	81.3 (27.4)	76.1 (24.5)	102.9 (39.4)
Mean daily maximum °F (°C)	39.9 (4.4)	43.1 (6.2)	51.3 (10.7)	63.1 (17.3)	72.6 (22.6)	81.8 (27.7)	86.0 (30.0)	84.4 (29.1)	77.6 (25.3)	66.2 (19.0)	55.4 (13.0)	44.2 (6.8)	63.9 (17.7)
Daily mean °F (°C)	31.9 (−0.1)	34.4 (1.3)	41.8 (5.4)	52.5 (11.4)	61.9 (16.6)	71.4 (21.9)	76.1 (24.5)	74.6 (23.7)	67.5 (19.7)	55.9 (13.3)	46.2 (7.9)	36.4 (2.4)	54.3 (12.4)
Mean daily minimum °F (°C)	23.8 (−4.6)	25.8 (−3.4)	32.3 (0.2)	41.9 (5.5)	51.2 (10.7)	61.0 (16.1)	66.1 (18.9)	64.8 (18.2)	57.3 (14.1)	45.5 (7.5)	37.1 (2.8)	28.5 (−1.9)	44.7 (7.1)
Record low °F (°C)	−9.2 (−22.9)	−2.1 (−18.9)	4.3 (−15.4)	18.1 (−7.7)	34.1 (1.2)	42.8 (6.0)	49.1 (9.5)	43.7 (6.5)	36.9 (2.7)	25.7 (−3.5)	13.2 (−10.4)	−0.1 (−17.8)	−9.2 (−22.9)
Average precipitation inches (mm)	3.55 (90)	2.73 (69)	4.15 (105)	3.98 (101)	4.33 (110)	4.33 (110)	5.18 (132)	4.40 (112)	4.38 (111)	3.75 (95)	3.61 (92)	3.96 (101)	48.35 (1,228)
Average snowfall inches (cm)	7.1 (18)	8.8 (22)	3.8 (9.7)	0.7 (1.8)	0.0 (0.0)	0.0 (0.0)	0.0 (0.0)	0.0 (0.0)	0.0 (0.0)	0.0 (0.0)	0.4 (1.0)	4.3 (11)	25.1 (64)
Average relative humidity (%)	65.9	63.0	58.5	57.9	62.6	65.9	66.4	68.6	69.6	69.1	67.7	68.2	65.3
Average dew point °F (°C)	21.8 (−5.7)	23.1 (−4.9)	28.3 (−2.1)	38.1 (3.4)	49.0 (9.4)	59.4 (15.2)	64.1 (17.8)	63.6 (17.6)	57.2 (14.0)	45.9 (7.7)	36.1 (2.3)	26.9 (−2.8)	42.9 (6.1)
Source: PRISM

== Ecology ==
According to the A. W. Kuchler U.S. potential natural vegetation types, Feasterville would have a dominant vegetation type of Appalachian Oak (104) with a dominant vegetation form of Eastern Hardwood Forest (25). The plant hardiness zone is 7a with an average annual extreme minimum air temperature of 1.2 °F (−17.1 °C). The average date of first spring leaf-out is March 25 and fall color usually peaks in late-October and early-November.
