= Trevose station =

Railway station in Trevose, Pennsylvania

Trevose
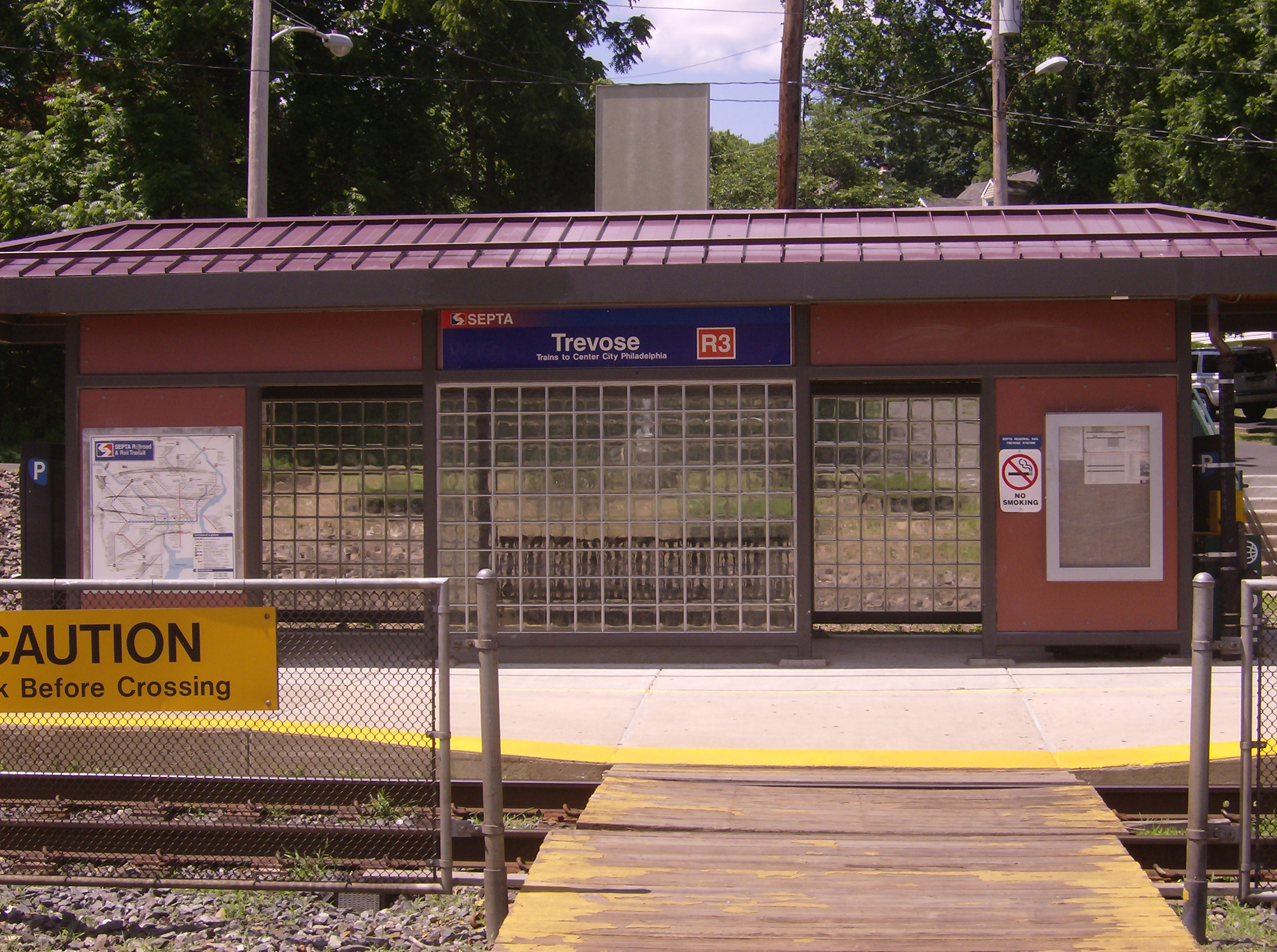
- Trevose station in June 2010

General information
- Location: Ridge and Boundbrook Avenues; Trevose, Pennsylvania 19053
- Coordinates: 40.1402°N 74.9828°W
- Owner: SEPTA
- Line: Neshaminy Line
- Platforms: 2 side platforms
- Tracks: 2

Construction
- Parking: 219
- Accessible: Yes

Other information
- Fare zone: 3

History
- Rebuilt: 1888
- Electrified: July 26, 1931

Key dates
- March 1970: 1888 station depot demolished

Passengers
- 2017: 412 boardings 377 alightings (weekday average)
- Rank: 63 of 146

Services
Preceding station	SEPTA	Following station
Somerton toward Penn Medicine Station	West Trenton Line	Neshaminy Falls toward West Trenton
Former services
Preceding station	Reading Railroad	Following station
Somerton toward Philadelphia	New York Branch	Neshaminy Falls toward Bound Brook
Location

Trevose station is a station along the SEPTA West Trenton Line to Ewing, New Jersey. It is located at Ridge and Boundbrook Avenues in Bensalem Township, Pennsylvania. The station has off-street parking and a handicapped-accessible platform, however SEPTA has recently announced that they've expanded the number of parking spaces to 219. In FY 2013, Trevose station had a weekday average of 283 boardings and 275 alightings.

The previous station depot at Trevose was built in 1888 by the Philadelphia & Reading Railroad. The former station house was torn down in March 1970 and replaced with a small shelter to protect commuters from the elements.

== Station layout ==
Trevose has two low-level side platforms with a mini high-level platform.
