= Feasterville-Trevose, Pennsylvania =

Feasterville-Trevose
- Census-designated place
- Location of Feasterville-Trevose in Pennsylvania Feasterville-Trevose (the United States)
- Coordinates: 40°09′05″N 74°59′07″W
- Country: United States
- State: Pennsylvania
- County: Bucks
- Township: Lower Southampton

Area
  - Total: 1.3 sq mi (3.4 km^{2})
  - Land: 1.3 sq mi (3.4 km^{2})
  - Water: 0.0 sq mi (0 km^{2})
- Elevation: 220 ft (67 m)

Population (2000)
  - Total: 6,525
  - Density: 5,000/sq mi (1,900/km^{2})
- Time zone: UTC-5 (EST)
  - Summer (DST): UTC-4 (EDT)
- ZIP code: 19053
- Area codes: 215, 267 and 445

Feasterville-Trevose is a former census-designated place (CDP) in Lower Southampton Township in Bucks County, Pennsylvania. The population was 6,525 at the 2000 census. The ZIP code 19053 is reserved exclusively for Feasterville-Trevose. However, since the Langhorne post office delivers their mail, Langhorne can be written as the city on a mail piece and it will be delivered. The area was separated into two CDPs in the 2010 census: Feasterville and Trevose.

The Feasterville-Trevose CDP referred to by the U.S. Census Bureau encompasses a portion of Lower Southampton Township, but other sections of the township to the west and south are commonly considered parts of Feasterville, while the community of Trevose extends into Bensalem Township. Lower Southampton Township to the north and is serviced by the Langhorne Post Office. The CDP is actually a relatively densely populated residential area between the two communities' central business districts.

== Geography ==
Feasterville-Trevose is no longer considered a single community. There are two separate towns, Feasterville and Trevose, which happen to share the same zip code.

According to the United States Census Bureau, the CDP has a total area of 1.3 square miles (3.4 km^{2}), all of it land.

== Demographics ==
Historical population
| Census | Pop. | Note | %± |
|---|---|---|---|
| 1990 | 6,696 | | — |
| 2000 | 6,525 | | −2.6% |

As of the census of 2000, there were 6,525 people, 2,578 households, and 1,776 families residing in the CDP. The population density was 4,909.4 inhabitants per square mile (1,895.5/km^{2}). There were 2,649 housing units at an average density of 1,993.8 per square mile (769.8/km^{2}). The racial makeup of the CDP was 94.39% White, 2.13% African American, 0.05% Native American, 1.99% Asian, 0.03% Pacific Islander, 0.41% from other races, and 1.00% from two or more races. Hispanic or Latino of any race were 2.28% of the population.

There is a significant Eastern European population, most notably of Russians, Ukrainians, and Polish peoples.

There were 2,578 households, out of which 32.9% had children under the age of 18 living with them, 54.6% were married couples living together, 9.7% had a female householder with no husband present, and 31.1% were non-families. 25.0% of all households were made up of individuals, and 7.5% had someone living alone who was 65 years of age or older. The average household size was 2.53 and the average family size was 3.06.

In the CDP the population was spread out, with 23.4% under the age of 18, 7.8% from 18 to 24, 35.4% from 25 to 44, 20.5% from 45 to 64, and 12.9% who were 65 years of age or older. The median age was 36 years. For every 100 females, there were 100.7 males. For every 100 females age 18 and over, there were 98.7 males.

The median income for a household in the CDP was $49,958, and the median income for a family was $57,301. Males had a median income of $38,681 versus $31,029 for females. The per capita income for the CDP was $22,161. About 2.9% of families and 3.0% of the population were below the poverty line, including 4.0% of those under age 18 and 2.4% of those age 65 or over.

== Notable natives ==
- Former MLB baseball player Ken Reynolds
- Anthony Fedorov, who advanced to the final four of the 2005 season of American Idol grew up here after immigrating from the Soviet Union in 1994

== Sports ==
The Southampton Cyclones of the American Inline Hockey League, a professional roller hockey team, has been based at the Feasterville Sportsplex since 2006. The franchise was previously known as the Feasterville Fury, and a team under that name then played in the Professional Inline Hockey Association from 2007 until 2009.

The 2003 National Collegiate Roller Hockey Association National Championship tournament was held at the Feasterville Sportsplex. College roller hockey teams from around the country competed for Championships at the Division I, II and, III levels. Cal Poly Pomona, Binghamton University, and St. Charles Community College of Missouri won the Championships in their respective divisions.

Additionally, the Eastern Collegiate Roller Hockey Association (ECRHA) Regional Championships were contested in Feasterville from 2003 through 2007.

== Climate ==
According to the Köppen climate classification system, Feasterville-Trevose has a Humid subtropical climate (Cfa). Cfa climates are characterized by all months having an average mean temperature > 32.0 °F (0.0 °C), at least four months with an average mean temperature ≥ 50.0 °F (10.0 °C), at least one month with an average mean temperature ≥ 71.6 °F (22.0 °C) and no significant precipitation difference between seasons. Although most summer days are slightly humid in Feasterville-Trevose, episodes of heat and high humidity can occur with heat index values > 108 °F (42 °C). Since 1981, the highest air temperature was 102.9 °F (39.4 °C) on July 22, 2011, and the highest daily average mean dew point was 76.2 °F (24.6 °C) on August 13, 1999. The average wettest month is July which correlates with the peak in thunderstorm activity. Since 1981, the wettest calendar day was 6.73 inches (171 mm) on August 27, 2011. During the winter months, the average annual extreme minimum air temperature is 1.2 °F (−17.1 °C). Since 1981, the coldest air temperature was −9.2 °F (−22.9 °C) on January 22, 1984. Episodes of extreme cold and wind can occur with wind chill values < −9 °F (−23 °C). The average annual snowfall (Nov-Apr) is 25.1 inches (64 cm). Ice storms and large snowstorms depositing ≥ 12 inches (30 cm) occur once every few years, particularly during nor'easters from December through February.

Climate data for Feasterville-Trevose. Elevation: 213 feet (65 m), 1981–2010 normals, extremes 1981–2019
| Month | Jan | Feb | Mar | Apr | May | Jun | Jul | Aug | Sep | Oct | Nov | Dec | Year |
|---|---|---|---|---|---|---|---|---|---|---|---|---|---|
| Record high °F (°C) | 71.6 (22.0) | 77.9 (25.5) | 87.3 (30.7) | 94.2 (34.6) | 95.4 (35.2) | 96.5 (35.8) | 102.9 (39.4) | 100.5 (38.1) | 98.3 (36.8) | 93.7 (34.3) | 81.3 (27.4) | 76.1 (24.5) | 102.9 (39.4) |
| Mean daily maximum °F (°C) | 40.3 (4.6) | 43.1 (6.2) | 51.3 (10.7) | 63.1 (17.3) | 72.6 (22.6) | 81.8 (27.7) | 86.0 (30.0) | 84.4 (29.1) | 77.6 (25.3) | 66.2 (19.0) | 55.4 (13.0) | 44.2 (6.8) | 63.9 (17.7) |
| Daily mean °F (°C) | 32.2 (0.1) | 34.4 (1.3) | 32.2 (0.1) | 52.5 (11.4) | 61.9 (16.6) | 71.4 (21.9) | 76.1 (24.5) | 74.6 (23.7) | 67.5 (19.7) | 55.9 (13.3) | 46.2 (7.9) | 36.4 (2.4) | 54.3 (12.4) |
| Mean daily minimum °F (°C) | 24.1 (−4.4) | 25.8 (−3.4) | 32.3 (0.2) | 41.9 (5.5) | 51.2 (10.7) | 61.0 (16.1) | 66.1 (18.9) | 64.8 (18.2) | 57.3 (14.1) | 45.5 (7.5) | 37.1 (2.8) | 28.5 (−1.9) | 44.7 (7.1) |
| Record low °F (°C) | −9.2 (−22.9) | −2.1 (−18.9) | 4.3 (−15.4) | 18.1 (−7.7) | 34.1 (1.2) | 42.8 (6.0) | 49.1 (9.5) | 43.7 (6.5) | 36.9 (2.7) | 25.7 (−3.5) | 13.2 (−10.4) | −0.1 (−17.8) | −9.2 (−22.9) |
| Average precipitation inches (mm) | 3.55 (90) | 2.73 (69) | 4.15 (105) | 3.98 (101) | 4.33 (110) | 4.33 (110) | 5.18 (132) | 4.40 (112) | 4.38 (111) | 3.75 (95) | 3.61 (92) | 3.96 (101) | 48.35 (1,228) |
| Average snowfall inches (cm) | 7.1 (18) | 8.8 (22) | 3.8 (9.7) | 0.7 (1.8) | 0.0 (0.0) | 0.0 (0.0) | 0.0 (0.0) | 0.0 (0.0) | 0.0 (0.0) | 0.0 (0.0) | 0.4 (1.0) | 4.3 (11) | 25.1 (64) |
| Average relative humidity (%) | 65.9 | 63.0 | 58.5 | 57.9 | 62.6 | 65.9 | 66.4 | 68.6 | 69.6 | 69.1 | 67.7 | 68.2 | 65.3 |
| Average dew point °F (°C) | 21.8 (−5.7) | 23.1 (−4.9) | 28.3 (−2.1) | 38.1 (3.4) | 49.0 (9.4) | 59.4 (15.2) | 64.1 (17.8) | 63.6 (17.6) | 57.2 (14.0) | 45.9 (7.7) | 36.1 (2.3) | 26.9 (−2.8) | 42.9 (6.1) |
Source: PRISM

== Ecology ==
According to the A. W. Kuchler U.S. potential natural vegetation types, Feasterville-Trevose would have a dominant vegetation type of Appalachian Oak (104) with a dominant vegetation form of Eastern Hardwood Forest (25). The plant hardiness zone is 7a with an average annual extreme minimum air temperature of 1.2 °F (−17.1 °C). The average date of first spring leaf-out is March 25 and fall color usually peaks in late October and early November.
