= Neshaminy Falls, Pennsylvania =

Unincorporated community in Pennsylvania, US

- Unincorporated community
- Location within Pennsylvania Location within the United States
- Coordinates: 40°9′12″N 74°57′34″W
- Country: United States
- State: Pennsylvania
- County: Bucks
- Township: Bensalem
- Elevation: 138 ft (42 m)
- Time zone: UTC-5 (Eastern (EST))
  - Summer (DST): UTC-4 (EDT)
- ZIP Code: 19053
- Area codes: 215, 267 and 445
- GNIS feature ID: 1182258

Neshaminy Falls is an unincorporated community in Bensalem Township in Bucks County, Pennsylvania, United States. Neshaminy Falls is located in the northwestern part of the township, southwest of Bristol Road. It is served by the Neshaminy Falls station on SEPTA's West Trenton Line.

The community derives its name from Neshaminy Creek, a Native American name purported to mean "double stream".
