= Belmont (Bensalem, Pennsylvania) =

Historic house in Pennsylvania, United States

- U.S. National Register of Historic Places
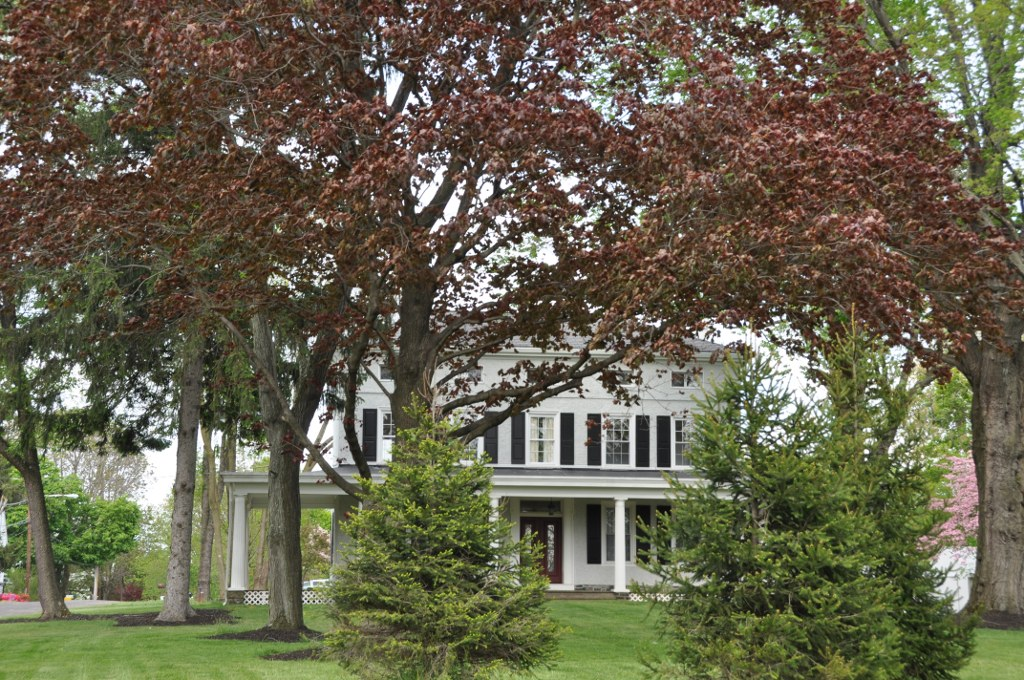
- Belmont, April 2012

- Location within Pennsylvania Location within the United States
- Interactive map showing the location of Belmont
- Location: 3779 Bristol Rd., Bensalem, Pennsylvania
- Coordinates: 40°8′27″N 74°57′5″W
- Area: 0.1 acres (0.040 ha)
- Built: c. 1850
- Architectural style: Greek Revival
- NRHP reference No.: 88000460
- Added to NRHP: May 3, 1988

Belmont is a historic home located at Bensalem, Bucks County, Pennsylvania. It was built about 1850, and is an L-shaped, 2 3/4-story, stuccoed stone dwelling in the Greek Revival style. It has a hipped roof and features a one-story, wraparound verandah. The home was built for a mill owner by the name of Paul Townsend on a farm property in 1850 and owned until his death in 1890. The home is across the street from Neshaminy Mall on Bristol Road.

It was added to the National Register of Historic Places in 1988. It is currently a private residence.
