= Somerton station =

Railway station in Philadelphia

Somerton
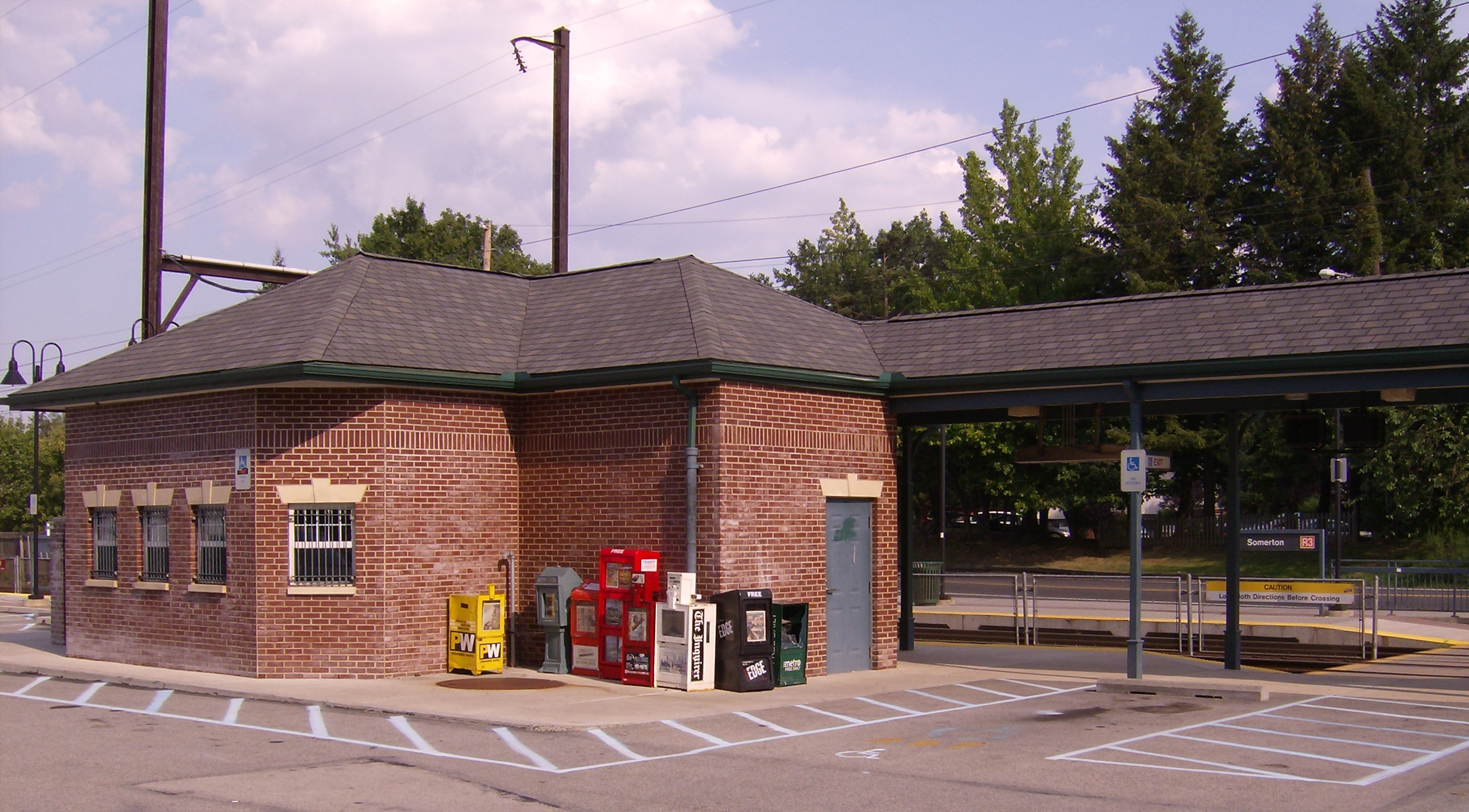
- Somerton station in August 2006

General information
- Location: 14001 Bustleton Avenue; Philadelphia, Pennsylvania, U.S.
- Coordinates: 40.1307°N 75.0121°W
- Owner: SEPTA
- Line: Neshaminy Line
- Platforms: 2 side platforms
- Tracks: 2
- Connections: SEPTA City Bus: 58

Construction
- Parking: 201 spaces
- Cycle facilities: Yes
- Accessible: Yes

Other information
- Fare zone: 3

History
- Electrified: July 26, 1931

Passengers
- 2017: 724 boardings 627 alightings (weekday average)
- Rank: 29 of 146

Services
Preceding station	SEPTA	Following station
Forest Hills toward Penn Medicine Station	West Trenton Line	Trevose toward West Trenton
Former services
Preceding station	Reading Railroad	Following station
Forest Hills toward Philadelphia	New York Branch	Trevose toward Bound Brook
Location

Somerton station is a station along the SEPTA West Trenton Line to Ewing, New Jersey. It is located at Bustleton and Philmont Avenues in the Somerton neighborhood of Philadelphia, Pennsylvania. In FY 2013, Somerton station had a weekday average of 676 boardings and 714 alightings. The station has off-street parking and a ticket office. There is also a handicapped-accessible platform for people who need it.

== Station layout ==
Somerton has two low-level side platforms with a mini high-level platform.

== Gallery ==
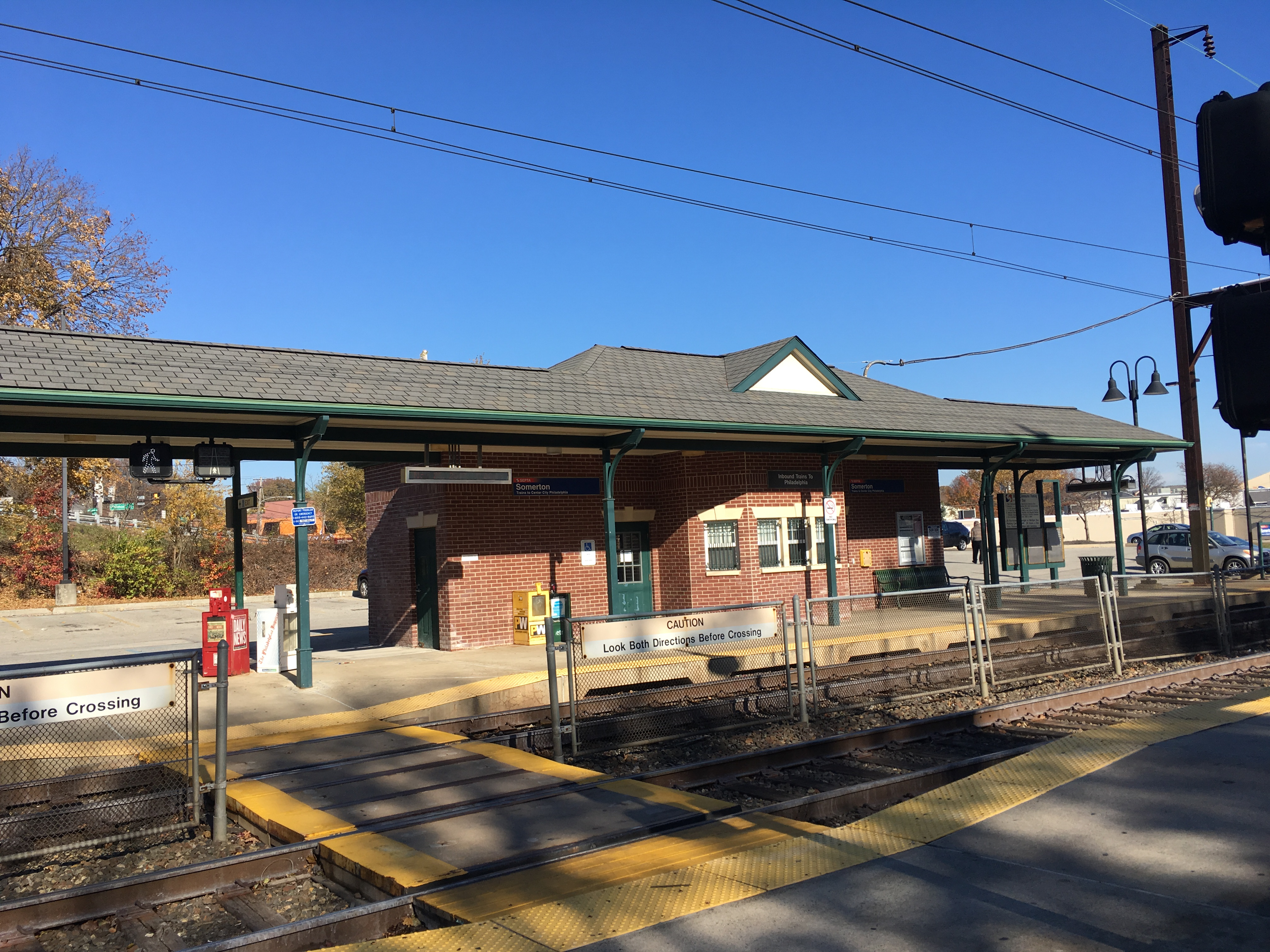
View of Somerton station from outbound platform
