= Neshaminy Mall =

Defunct mall in Bucks County, Pennsylvania, U.S.

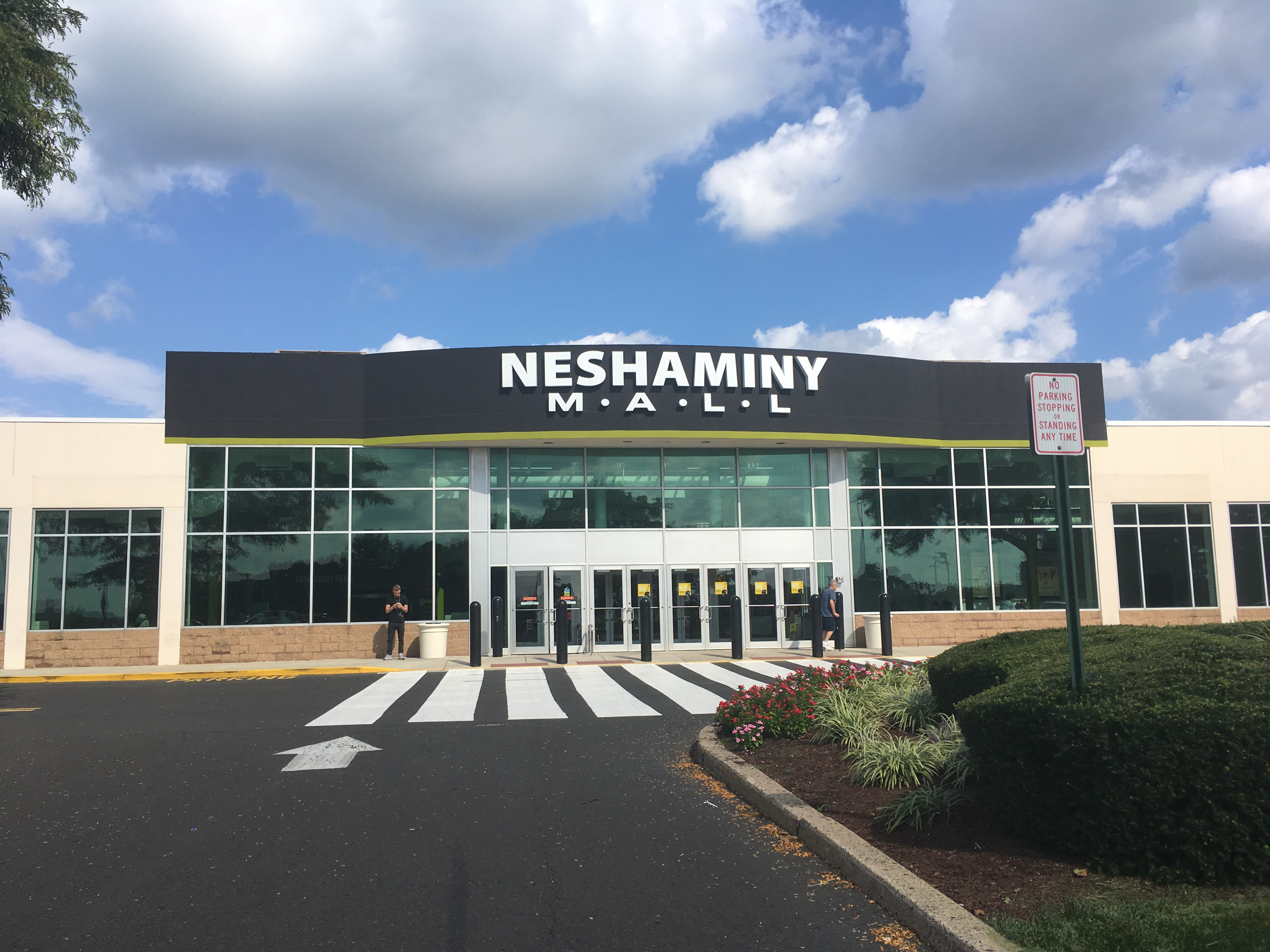
- Food court entrance at Neshaminy Mall in 2018
- Location: Bensalem, Pennsylvania
- Coordinates: 40.1391°N 74.9543°W
- Address: 707 Neshaminy Mall, 19020
- Opened: August 19, 1968; 58 years ago
- Closed: October 31, 2026; 7 days ago
- Developer: The Korman Company and Strouse Greenberg
- Owner: Paramount Realty Group and Edgewood Properties
- Num. of stores: 120+ (at peak)
- Num. of anchor tenants: 4 (at peak; 2 remaining)
- Floor area: 1,025,297 sq ft (95,253 m^{2})
- Floors: 1 (2 in Boscov's and former Sears, 3 in former Macy's)
- Parking: Parking lot with 7,000 spaces
- Public transit: SEPTA bus: 14, 58, 128, 130, Boulevard Direct
- Website: neshaminymall.com

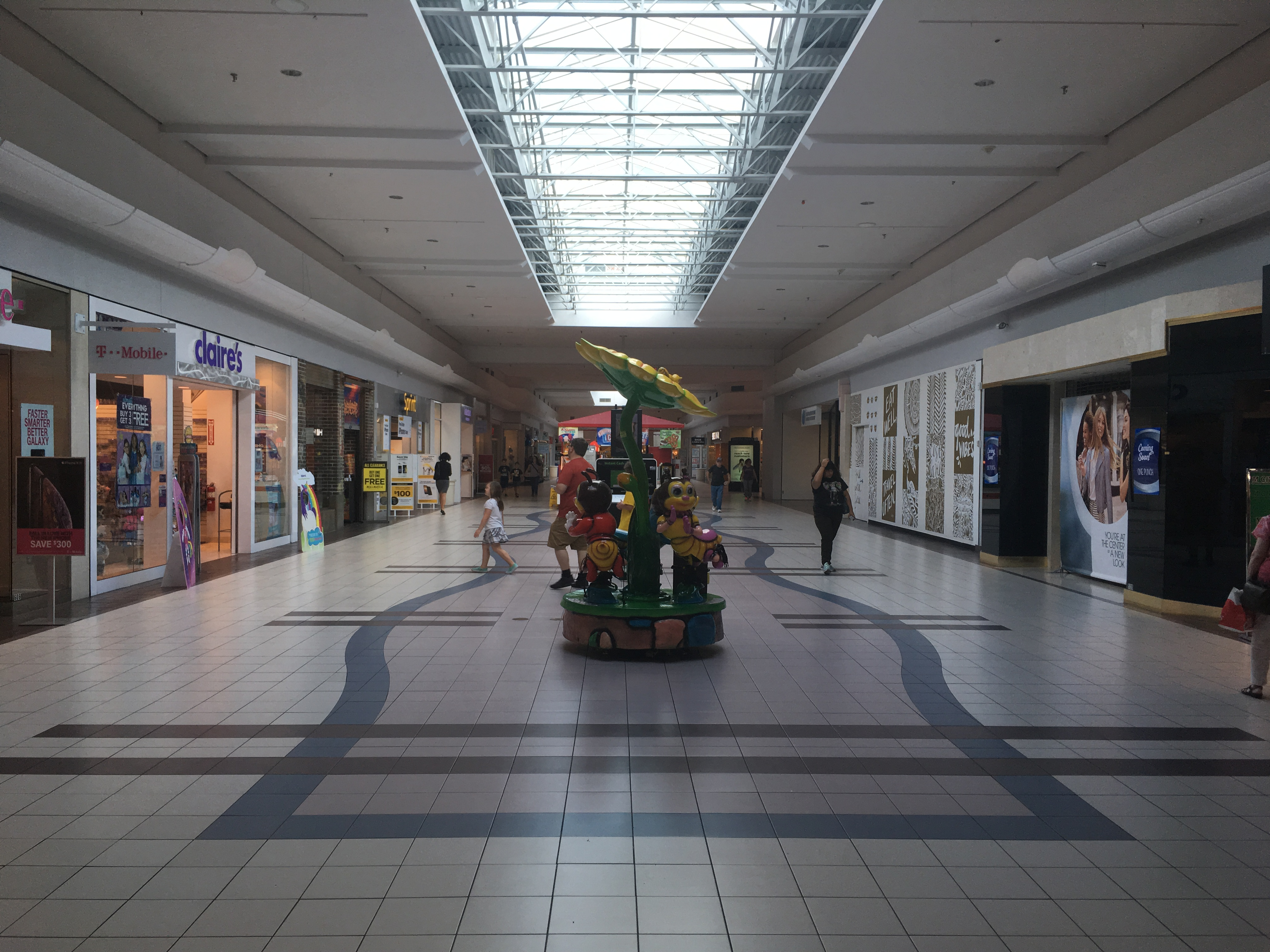
Boscov's wing of the Neshaminy Mall in 2018

Neshaminy Mall is a defunct mall located at U.S. Route 1 and Bristol Road in Bensalem Township, Pennsylvania. The mall opened in 1968, and was the sixth interior mall constructed in Greater Philadelphia. The mall was anchored by Boscov's and AMC Theatres and at its peak, hosted over 120 shops and eateries including a food court that was opened in 1989 and retailers including Barnes & Noble.

The Neshaminy Mall was directly across Bristol Road from Belmont, a historic home. The mall was named after the nearby Neshaminy Creek and features a unique fountain, which features a waterfall, trees, plants and a statue of Tawanka who was a leader of the Lenni Lenape Native American tribe. The world "Neshaminy" comes from the Lenni Lenape tribe's language.

In the 2010s, the mall saw an increased vacancy rate. During its final years, it was considered a dead mall by locals. In September 2026, the remaining inline tenants received notices to vacate by the end of October. Bensalem Township officials said that Paramount plans to demolish the main mall by the end of the year.

== Location ==
The Neshaminy Mall was located in Bensalem Township in Bucks County, Pennsylvania. The mall is located off of the Pennsylvania Turnpike and U.S. Route 1. The Neshaminy Mall was accessible through SEPTA's routes 14, 58, 128, 130 and Boulevard Direct bus routes.

== History ==
Plans to build the Neshaminy Mall were made in 1966, with Sears and Strawbridge & Clothier to be anchors. The mall was projected to cost $24 million. The Neshaminy Mall opened in 1968, developed by The Korman Company and Strouse Greenberg. The mall underwent an expansion in 1975 that added a Lit Brothers, along with a new wing of stores. In 1977, the Lit Brothers store at the Neshaminy Mall closed as part of the chain closing all its stores in the Philadelphia area and was replaced by Pomeroy's. The Pomeroy's store became The Bon-Ton in 1987 after the chain was sold. A food court was added to the mall in 1989. In 1990, the Neshaminy Mall was purchased by Homart Development Company from Mutual of New York for over $50 million. The Bon-Ton closed in 1994. In 1995, the mall underwent a renovation that expanded the food court. In addition, Boscov's replaced the former Bon-Ton. The same year, General Growth Properties took over ownership of the mall after it acquired Homart Development Company. A 24-screen movie theater to be built at the mall was approved by Bensalem Township in 1997 after they had initially opposed the project. In 1998, the 24-screen AMC Theatres opened in the mall at a cost of $11 million. The Strawbridge's became Macy's in 2006 after Federated Department Stores acquired May Department Stores in 2005. A former pet store in the Sears court was demolished and replaced with a Barnes & Noble In 2009. In 2015, the mall began a small renovation starting with signage at mall entrances, the main sign and an expansion of the Boscov's.

On January 4, 2017, Macy's announced that its store would be closing in spring 2017 as part of a plan to close 68 stores nationwide. Since the announcement was made, the Macy's closed in early April. As of late 2017, the Neshaminy Mall has seen a slow, but noticeable increase in the vacancy rate, likely to increase more due to the departure of the Macy's. Brookfield Properties bought General Growth Properties in 2018, therefore giving Brookfield ownership of Neshaminy Mall. On October 15, 2018, it was announced the Sears store would be closing as part of a plan to close 142 stores nationwide as a result of the company filing for Chapter 11 bankruptcy. The store closed in January 2019, leaving Boscov's as the only traditional department store at the mall. Plans were made to redevelop the former Sears anchor into a Round One Entertainment space, however, these plans were cancelled due to the COVID-19 pandemic.

In July 2020, it was announced that medical offices would take over the former Sears building. In March 2020, the former Macy's store was sold to SANT properties, who planned to convert the space into mixed use.Wawa had announced plans to build a store in part of the former Macy’s parking lot, however plans never materialized. There were plans to convert the former Macy's space into a Fusion Gyms fitness center. The plans, however, fell through as of April 2025, primarily due to issues with obtaining construction permits.

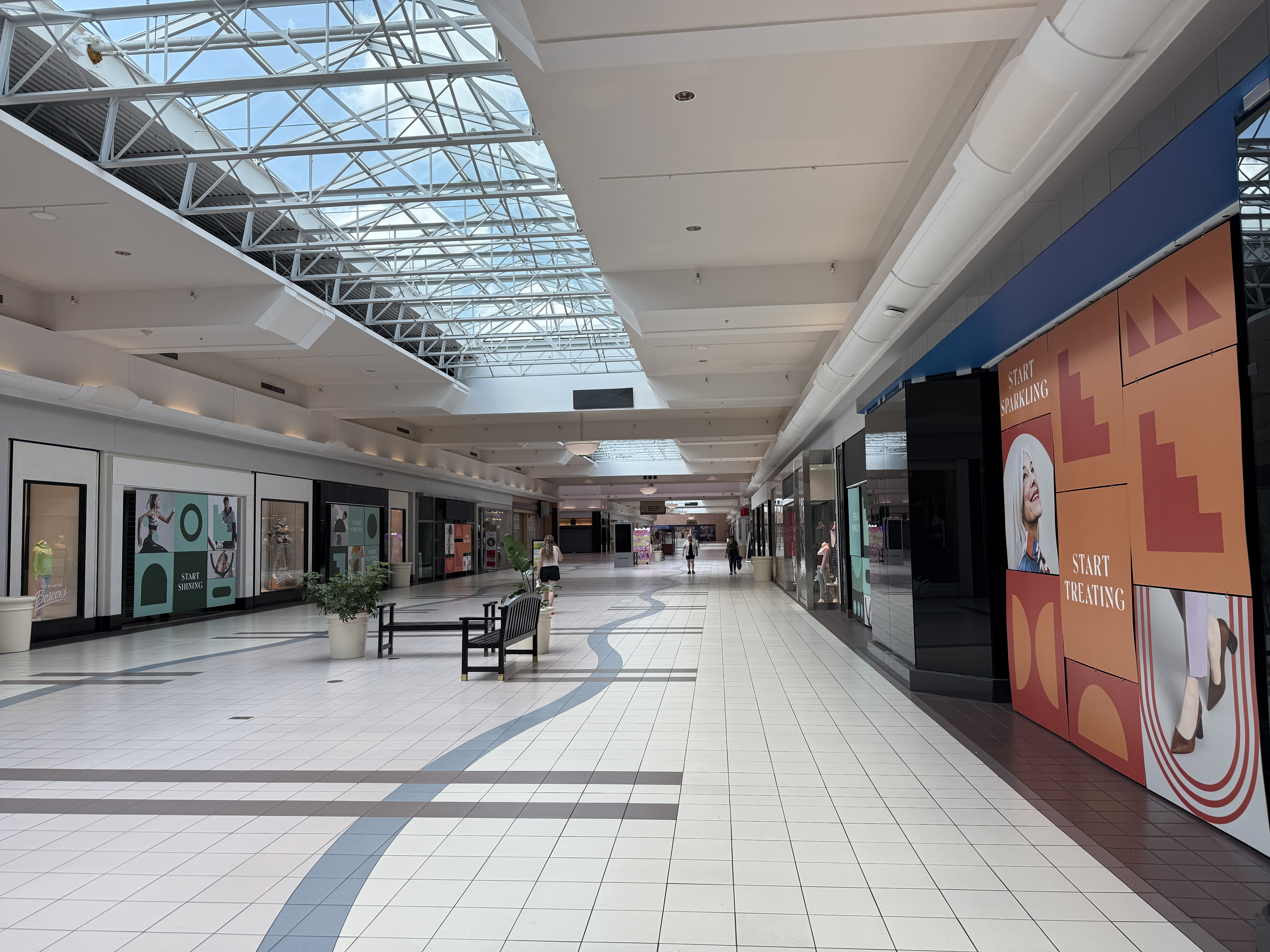
Interior of the Neshaminy Mall in 2025

In the years soon following the COVID-19 pandemic, the Neshaminy Mall has seen an increased vacancy rate and a decrease in foot traffic. Stores such as Foot Locker and Modell's Sporting Goods have closed, as well as dining options including Chick-fil-A and Charleys Philly Steaks. The Neshaminy Carnival, once a popular event, was also canceled in 2024.

By 2024, more than half the stores in the Neshaminy Mall were vacant, with over 40 stores remaining. In February 2024, the Neshaminy Mall was put up for sale. In June 2024, it was announced that Paramount Realty Group will purchase the Neshaminy Mall. On July 15, 2024, Paramount Realty Group and Edgewood Properties closed on the purchase of the mall for $27.5 million.

On September 13, 2026, tenants at the mall received notices to vacate by October 31. Officials from Bensalem Township confirmed that the mall would close on October 31, and will be demolished in December. Boscov's, AMC Theatres, Barnes & Noble, and the Uno Pizzeria & Grill outparcel will remain open after the demolition. Although Paramount Properties has not presented any formal redevelopment plans, they are exploring the potential for a mixed-use development that could include housing, retail, and medical facilities.

It is unknown if the former Macy's will be demolished.
