= Trevose, Pennsylvania =

Unincorporated community in Pennsylvania, US

- Census-designated place
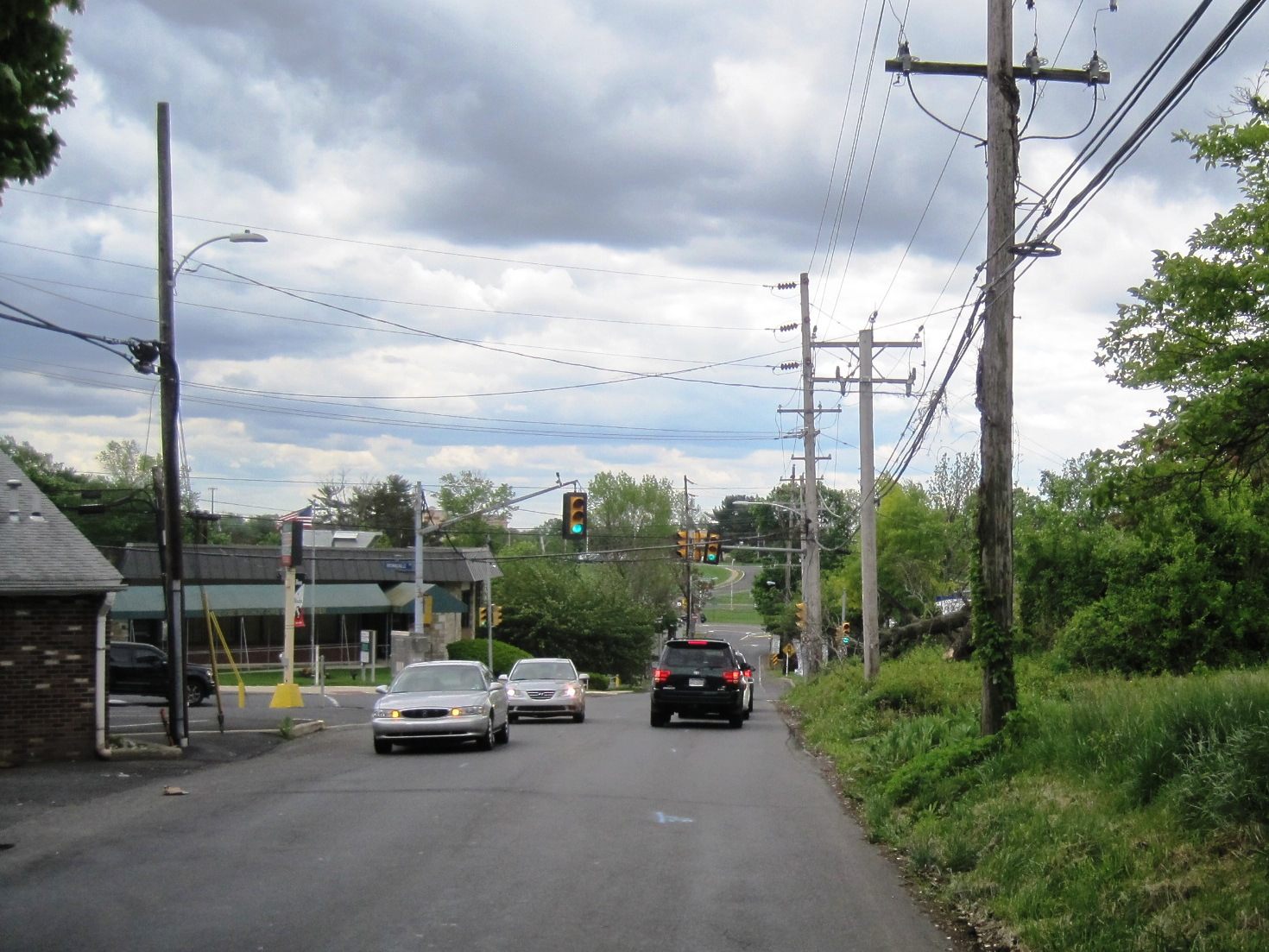
- Intersection of Old Street Road and Brownsville Road

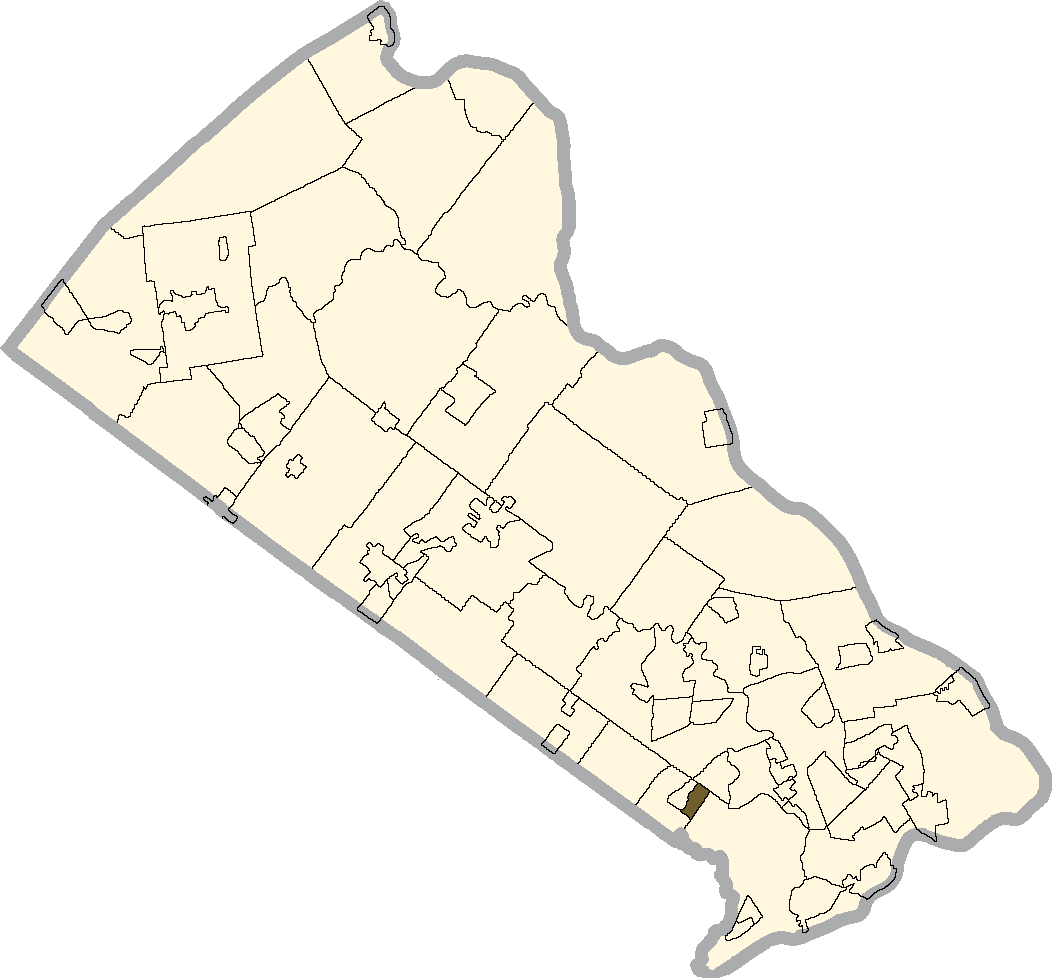
- Location of Trevose in Bucks County, Pennsylvania

- Location of Trevose in Pennsylvania Trevose (the United States)
- Coordinates: 40°08′21″N 74°58′52″W
- Country: United States
- State: Pennsylvania
- County: Bucks
- Township: Lower Southampton

Area
  - Total: 0.706 sq mi (1.83 km^{2})
  - Land: 0.706 sq mi (1.83 km^{2})
  - Water: 0 sq mi (0 km^{2})
- Elevation: 128 ft (39 m)

Population (2020)
  - Total: 3,460
  - Density: 4,900/sq mi (1,890/km^{2})
- Time zone: UTC-5 (Eastern (EST))
  - Summer (DST): UTC-4 (EDT)
- ZIP Code: 19053
- Area codes: 215, 267 and 445
- GNIS feature ID: 1189750

Pennsylvania Historical Marker
- Designated: October 29, 1946

Trevose is a census-designated place within Lower Southampton Township in Bucks County, Pennsylvania, United States.

Trevose was formerly part of Feasterville-Trevose, but was split into two separate CDPs for the 2010 census. U.S. 1 runs through the town as well as the Pennsylvania Turnpike, but Trevose's main road is Brownsville Road, which is the dividing line between the two townships. As of the 2010 census, Trevose had a population of 3,550.

== History ==
The community is named after the Growden Mansion, the homestead of settler Joseph Growden. The homestead was named after Growden's homestead in England (Growden was Cornish; Trevose is from the Cornish word Trenfos for farm.).

== Geography ==
=== Climate ===
According to the Köppen climate classification system, Trevose has a Humid subtropical climate (Cfa). Cfa climates are characterized by all months having an average mean temperature > 32.0 °F (0.0 °C), at least four months with an average mean temperature ≥ 50.0 °F (10.0 °C), at least one month with an average mean temperature ≥ 71.6 °F (22.0 °C) and no significant precipitation difference between seasons. Although most summer days are slightly humid in Trevose, episodes of heat and high humidity can occur with heat index values > 107 °F (42 °C). Since 1981, the highest air temperature was 102.9 °F (39.4 °C) on July 22, 2011, and the highest average mean dew point was 76.5 °F (24.7 °C) on August 13, 1999. The average wettest month is July which corresponds with the annual peak in thunderstorm activity.

Since 1981, the wettest calendar day was 6.73 inches (171 mm) on August 27, 2011. During the winter months, the average annual extreme minimum air temperature is 1.2 °F (−17.1 °C). Since 1981, the coldest air temperature was −9.0 °F (−22.8 °C) on January 22, 1984. Episodes of extreme cold and wind can occur with wind chill values < −9 °F (−23 °C). The average annual snowfall (Nov-Apr) is 25.1 inches (64 cm). Ice storms and large snowstorms depositing ≥ 12 inches (30 cm) occur once every few years, particularly during nor’easters from December through February.

The town was struck by an unusually powerful EF3 tornado on July 29, 2021. The tornado, which directly hit a car dealership, was recorded by many bystanders.

Climate data for Trevose. Elevation: 154 ft (47 m), 1991–2020 normals, extremes 1981–2019
Month	Jan	Feb	Mar	Apr	May	Jun	Jul	Aug	Sep	Oct	Nov	Dec	Year
Record high °F (°C)	71.7 (22.1)	78.0 (25.6)	87.2 (30.7)	94.1 (34.5)	95.3 (35.2)	96.6 (35.9)	102.9 (39.4)	100.5 (38.1)	98.3 (36.8)	93.7 (34.3)	81.3 (27.4)	76.1 (24.5)	102.9 (39.4)
Mean daily maximum °F (°C)	40.5 (4.7)	43.3 (6.3)	51.4 (10.8)	63.2 (17.3)	72.7 (22.6)	81.9 (27.7)	86.1 (30.1)	84.5 (29.2)	77.7 (25.4)	66.4 (19.1)	55.6 (13.1)	44.4 (6.9)	64.0 (17.8)
Daily mean °F (°C)	32.5 (0.3)	34.6 (1.4)	42.0 (5.6)	52.7 (11.5)	62.1 (16.7)	71.6 (22.0)	76.2 (24.6)	74.8 (23.8)	67.6 (19.8)	56.1 (13.4)	46.4 (8.0)	36.6 (2.6)	54.5 (12.5)
Mean daily minimum °F (°C)	24.4 (−4.2)	26.0 (−3.3)	32.5 (0.3)	42.1 (5.6)	51.4 (10.8)	61.3 (16.3)	66.3 (19.1)	65.0 (18.3)	57.5 (14.2)	45.8 (7.7)	37.3 (2.9)	28.7 (−1.8)	44.9 (7.2)
Record low °F (°C)	−9.0 (−22.8)	−1.9 (−18.8)	4.5 (−15.3)	18.2 (−7.7)	34.2 (1.2)	43.0 (6.1)	49.3 (9.6)	43.9 (6.6)	37.2 (2.9)	26.0 (−3.3)	13.6 (−10.2)	0.1 (−17.7)	−9.0 (−22.8)
Average precipitation inches (mm)	3.54 (90)	2.73 (69)	4.15 (105)	3.97 (101)	4.32 (110)	4.32 (110)	5.17 (131)	4.39 (112)	4.36 (111)	3.74 (95)	3.60 (91)	3.96 (101)	48.25 (1,226)
Average snowfall inches (cm)	7.1 (18)	8.8 (22)	3.8 (9.7)	0.7 (1.8)	0.0 (0.0)	0.0 (0.0)	0.0 (0.0)	0.0 (0.0)	0.0 (0.0)	0.0 (0.0)	0.4 (1.0)	4.3 (11)	25.1 (64)
Average relative humidity (%)	65.7	62.8	58.3	57.5	62.2	65.4	66.2	68.2	69.3	68.8	67.2	67.9	65.0
Average dew point °F (°C)	21.9 (−5.6)	23.2 (−4.9)	28.4 (−2.0)	38.1 (3.4)	49.0 (9.4)	59.4 (15.2)	64.1 (17.8)	63.6 (17.6)	57.2 (14.0)	46.0 (7.8)	36.1 (2.3)	27.0 (−2.8)	42.9 (6.1)
Source: PRISM

== Demographics ==
=== 2020 census ===
As of the 2020 census, Trevose had a population of 3,842. The median age was 40.2 years. 21.1% of residents were under the age of 18 and 15.0% of residents were 65 years of age or older. For every 100 females there were 102.7 males, and for every 100 females age 18 and over there were 102.3 males age 18 and over.

100.0% of residents lived in urban areas, while 0.0% lived in rural areas.

There were 1,457 households in Trevose, of which 31.6% had children under the age of 18 living in them. Of all households, 50.4% were married-couple households, 18.7% were households with a male householder and no spouse or partner present, and 24.0% were households with a female householder and no spouse or partner present. About 24.5% of all households were made up of individuals and 10.3% had someone living alone who was 65 years of age or older.

There were 1,506 housing units, of which 3.3% were vacant. The homeowner vacancy rate was 0.3% and the rental vacancy rate was 3.7%.

Racial composition as of the 2020 census
Race	Number	Percent
White	3,287	85.6%
Black or African American	129	3.4%
American Indian and Alaska Native	5	0.1%
Asian	137	3.6%
Native Hawaiian and Other Pacific Islander	2	0.1%
Some other race	60	1.6%
Two or more races	222	5.8%
Hispanic or Latino (of any race)	225	5.9%

=== 2010 census ===
As of the 2010 U.S. census the population of Trevose was 93.6% White, 1.9% African-American, 2.4% Asian, .2% American Indian or Alaska Native, .1% Native Hawaiian and Other Pacific Islander, and 1.2% Two or More Races. Approximately 3% of the population was Hispanic.

Trevose has an educated population with 5% of the population has received their Master’s Degree, 16% with a Bachelor’s Degree, 26% with some form of college or Associate degree, 38% with a High School Diploma, and 14% of the population with less than a High School Diploma as of the 2010 Census

Trevose is 54% Female and 48% Male. 22% of the population is under 18, while 13% is over 65 years of age.

As of 2010, Trevose has a median household income of $82,413 and a median individual income of $34,943. Trevose’s unemployment rate is 6.5% and the poverty is very low at only 1%.

== Education ==
The CDP is in the Neshaminy School District.
