= Neshaminy Falls station =

Railway station in Bensalem Township, Pennsylvania

Neshaminy Falls
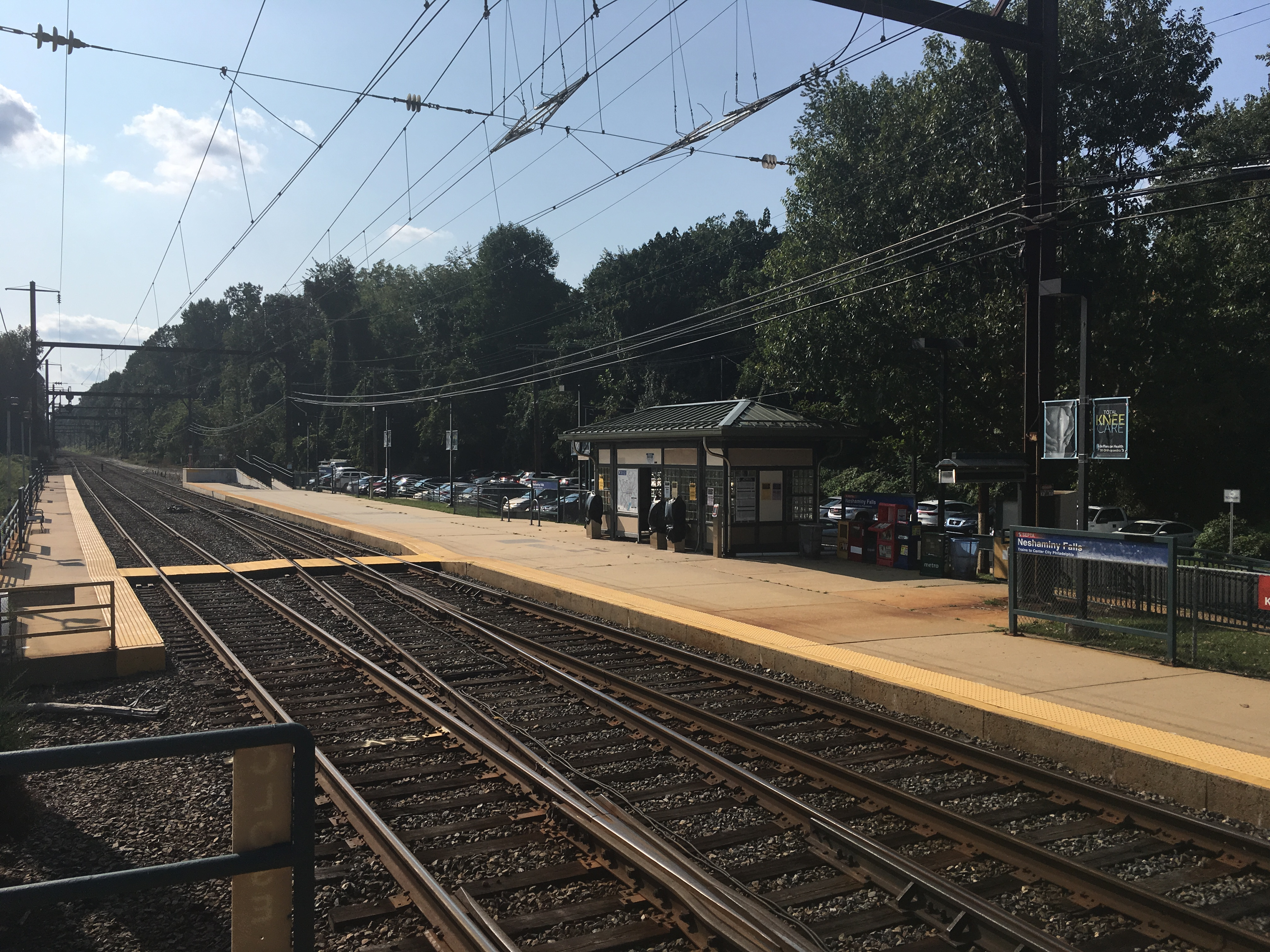
- The station at Neshaminy Falls, facing inbound towards Center City Philadelphia from the mini-high level platform on the outbound (West Trenton-bound) side.

General information
- Location: Bristol Road and Linden Street; Bensalem Township, Pennsylvania
- Coordinates: 40.1469°N 74.9622°W
- Owner: SEPTA
- Line: Neshaminy Line
- Platforms: 2 side platforms
- Tracks: 2
- Connections: SEPTA City Bus: 58

Construction
- Parking: 187
- Cycle facilities: Yes
- Accessible: Yes

Other information
- Fare zone: 3

History
- Rebuilt: 1888
- Electrified: July 26, 1931

Key dates
- March 1970: 1888 station depot demolished

Passengers
- 2017: 319 boardings 292 alightings (weekday average)
- Rank: 84 of 146

Services
Preceding station	SEPTA	Following station
Trevose toward Penn Medicine Station	West Trenton Line	Langhorne toward West Trenton
Former services
Preceding station	Reading Railroad	Following station
Trevose toward Philadelphia	New York Branch	Janney toward Bound Brook
Location

Neshaminy Falls station is a station along the SEPTA West Trenton Line to Ewing, New Jersey. It is located at Bristol Road & Linden Street in Bensalem Township, Pennsylvania. The station has off-street parking and a handicapped-accessible platform. In FY 2013, Neshaminy Falls station had a weekday average of 276 boardings and 259 alightings.

Neshaminy Falls station was originally built in 1888 by the Philadelphia & Reading Railroad for both passenger and freight service and was razed in March 1970. Neshaminy Falls station is also near CSX's Trenton Subdivision that leads to the Fox Chase Line between Ryers and Cheltenham stations.

== Station layout ==
Neshaminy Falls has two low-level side platforms with a mini high-level platform.

== Gallery ==
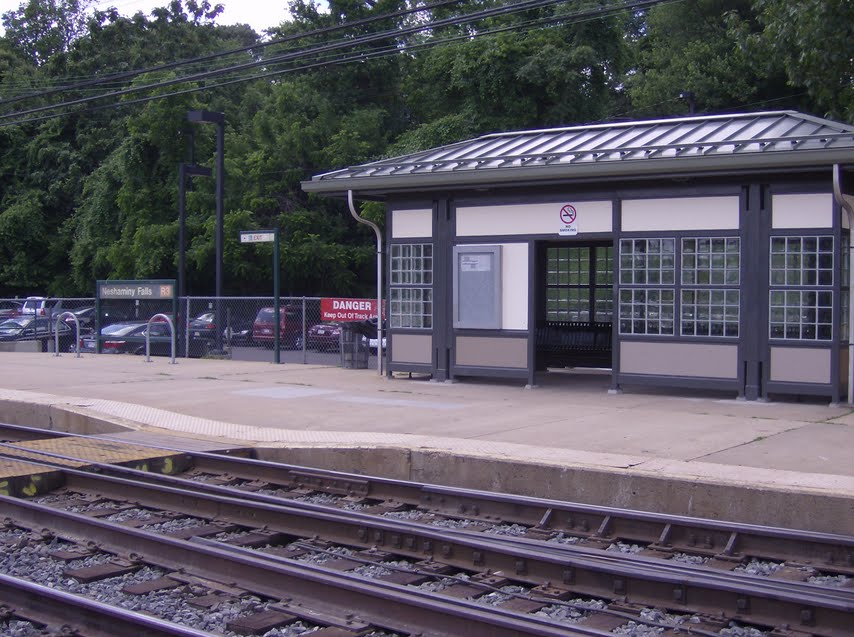
Neshaminy Falls station in June 2010

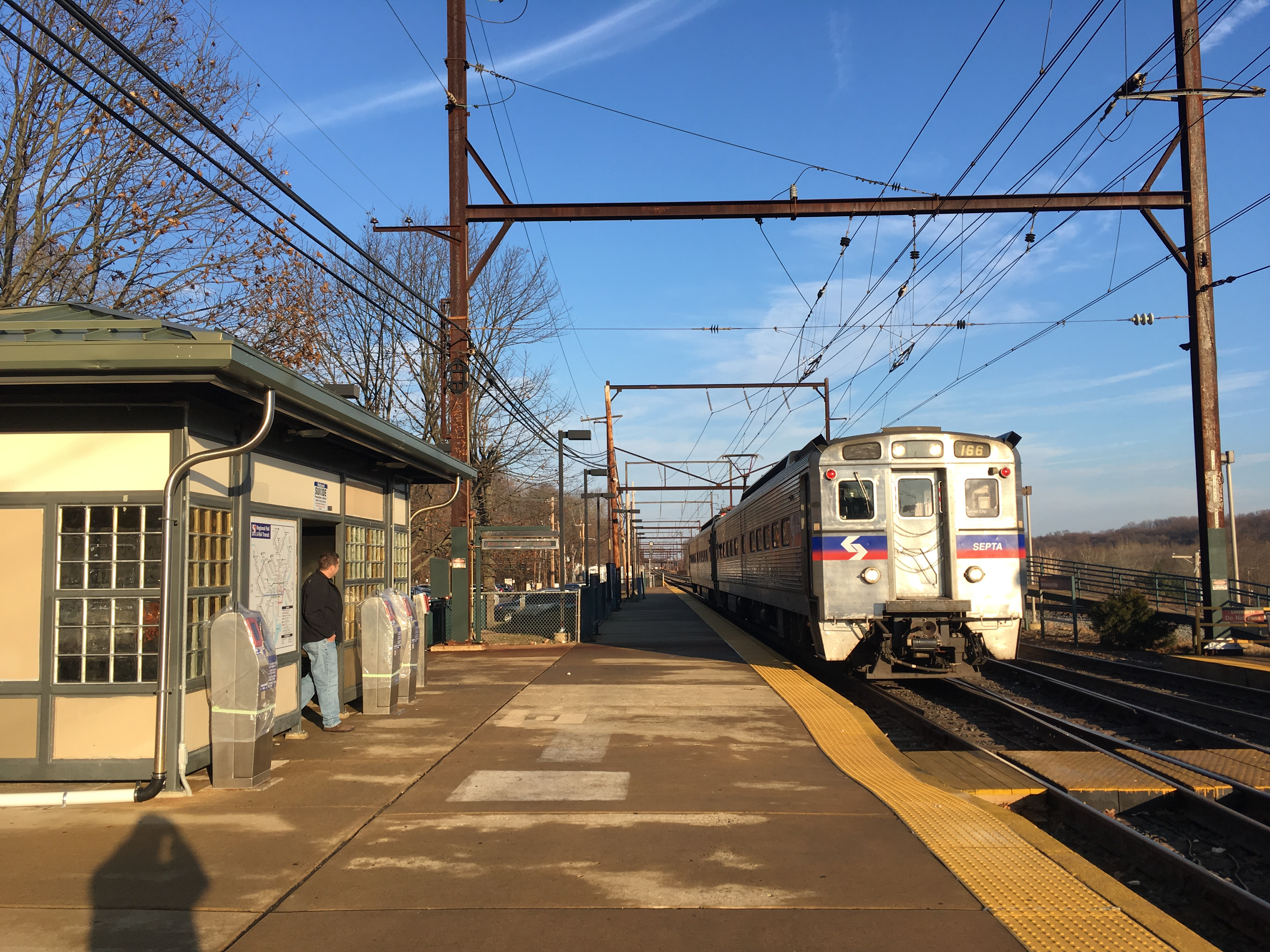
A Center City-bound train stops at Neshaminy Falls station in December 2017
