= Niederer =

Niederer is a German surname.

This surname is shared by the following people:

- Armin Niederer (born 1960), Swiss entrepreneur and former ice hockey player
- Caro Niederer (born 1963), Swiss artist
- Christina Niederer (born 1996), Swiss figure skater and dancer with Russian roots
- Daniela Niederer (better known by her stage name Nora En Pure), South African-Swiss DJ and deep house producer
- Edith Louisa Niederer (1890–1973), New Zealand farmer and community leader
- Marcel Niederer (born 1960), Swiss entrepreneur and former ice hockey player
- Sue Niederer, American political activist
