= Pennington station =

Railway station in Pennington, New Jersey

Pennington
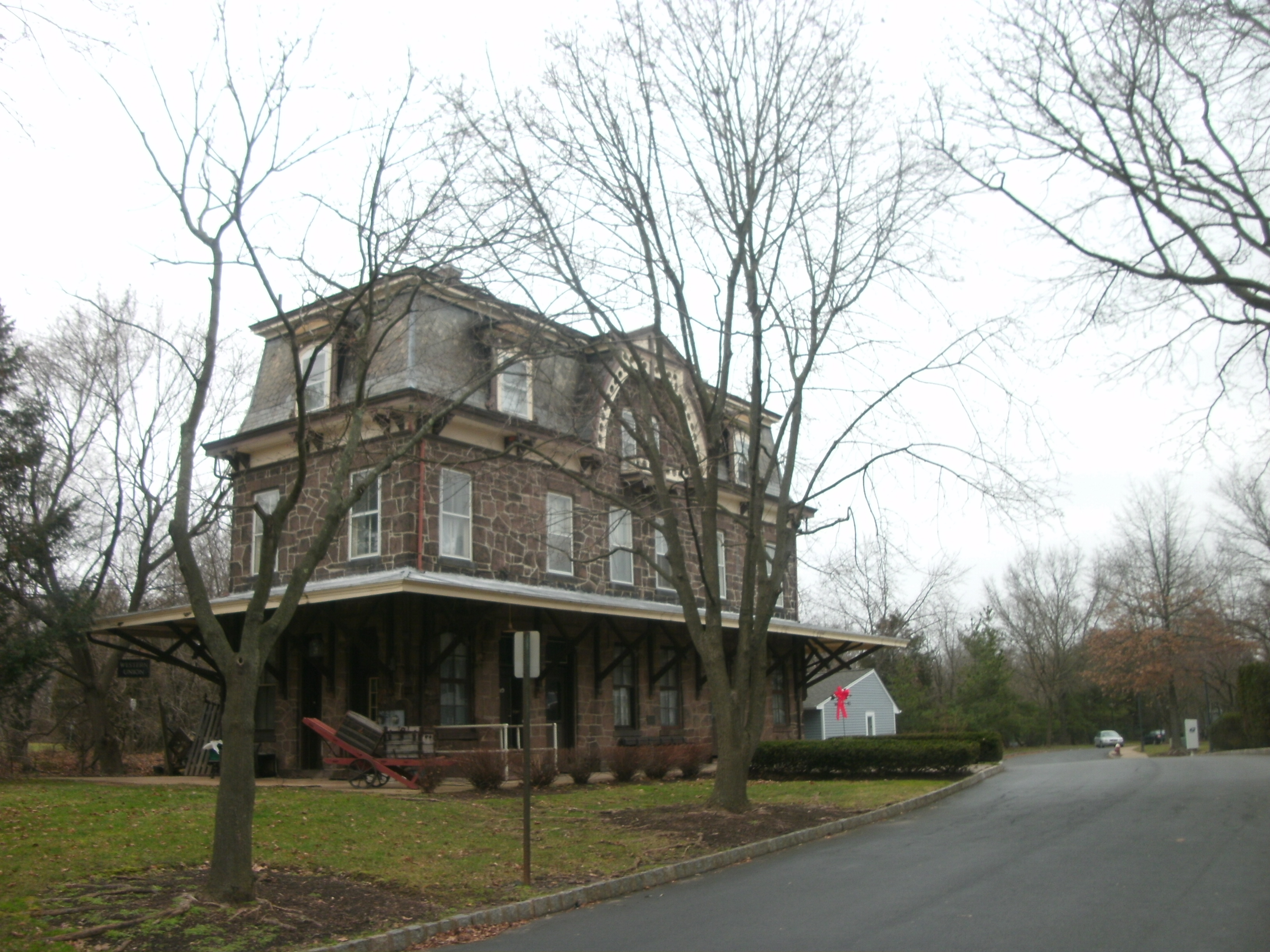
- The former Pennington station depot as seen in December 2011 as a private residence.

General information
- System: Former Reading Company station

History
- Opened: April 27, 1876 (ceremonial service); May 1, 1876 (regular service)
- Closed: 1967

Former services
Preceding station	Reading Railroad	Following station
West Trenton toward Philadelphia	New York Branch	Hopewell toward Bound Brook
- Pennington Railroad Station
- U.S. National Register of Historic Places
- New Jersey Register of Historic Places
- Location within Mercer County, New Jersey Location within New Jersey Location within the United States
- Location: Corner of Franklin and Green Avenue, Pennington, New Jersey
- Coordinates: 40°19′58″N 74°47′41″W
- Area: less than one acre
- Built: 1882
- Architect: Clarkson, Daniel A.
- Architectural style: Second Empire, Mansard
- NRHP reference No.: 74001170
- NJRHP No.: 1728

Significant dates
- Added to NRHP: December 31, 1974
- Designated NJRHP: November 11, 1974
Location

Pennington Railroad Station is a disused train station in Pennington, Mercer County, New Jersey, United States. The station was built in 1882 by the Reading Railroad, and added to the National Register of Historic Places on December 31, 1974.

== History ==
The first tracks in Pennington were completed in 1873, providing service to the Mercer and Somerset rail line but by 1976, the Delaware and Brook Bound line ran it out of business. Pennington Railroad Station was designed by Daniel A. Clarkson and in 1882, the station was completed by Irish workers. It was leased to the Reading Railroad for 990 years for $275,000 plus taxes. By the 1900s, roughly 50 trains stopped at the station, carrying mail, passengers and freight from Trenton, Philadelphia and New York and was round the clock staffed by an agent and three clerks. From 1888 to 1931 the stationmaster was Frank Butler Jamison. In 1911, Theodore Roosevelt stopped at the station during his Bull Moose Campaign.

After World War I, automobile ownership rose and the station declined, cutting Sunday services in 1945. In 1962, Reading Railroad had only two trains stopping at the station and in 1967 discontinued service completely.

The station is located along the CSX Trenton Subdivision and West Trenton Line which New Jersey Transit plans to revive for commuter rail service, however these plans do not include the reopening of the station, which is now a private residence.

== Architecture ==
The station is built of sandstone with a mansard roof and center pavilion in the Victorian style. It is a three-story building that is a focal point in the landscape of the town. The interior was simply designed with vertical beadboard. By the mid-1970s, the building had been remodeled as a private residence. It is similar in style to the Hopewell station, completed in 1876 in Hopewell, New Jersey.

== See also ==
- Delaware and Bound Brook Railroad
- National Register of Historic Places listings in Mercer County, New Jersey

== Bibliography ==
- Poor, Henry Varnum (1865). Manual of the Railroads of the United States: Volume 27. H.V. & H.W. Poor.
