= Pennington, New Jersey =

Borough in Mercer County, New Jersey, US

- Borough
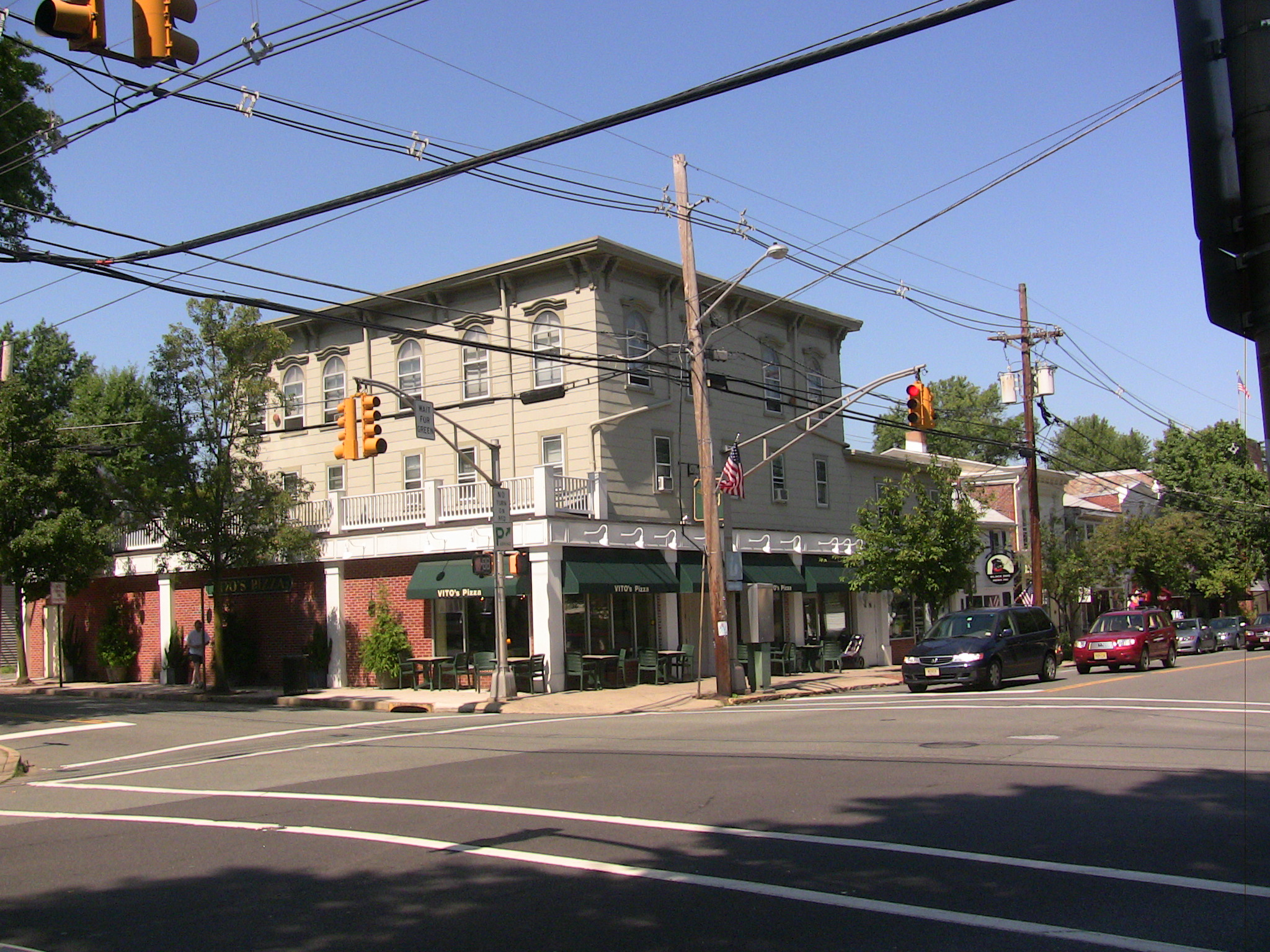
- Intersection of Main Street and Delaware Avenue in central Pennington

- Logo

- Location of Pennington in Mercer County highlighted in red (right). Inset map: Location of Mercer County in New Jersey highlighted in orange (left).

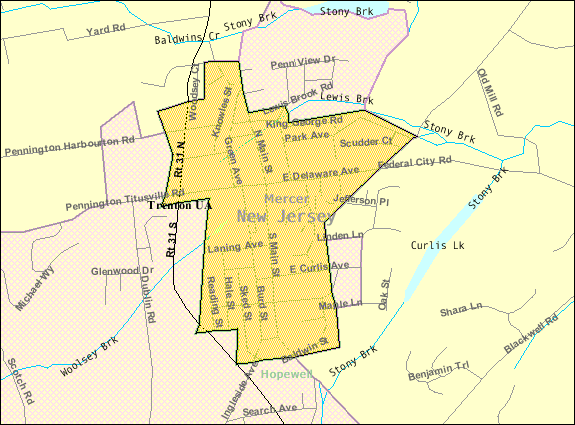
- Census Bureau map of Pennington, New Jersey

- Location in Mercer County Location in New Jersey Location in the United States
- Coordinates: 40.324923°N 74.78878°W
- Country: United States
- State: New Jersey
- County: Mercer
- Incorporated: January 31, 1890

Government
  - Type: Borough
  - Body: Borough Council
  - Mayor: James Davy (D, term ends December 31, 2023)
  - Administrator: Donato Nieman (interim)
  - Municipal clerk: Elizabeth Sterling

Area
  - Total: 0.97 sq mi (2.50 km^{2})
  - Land: 0.96 sq mi (2.49 km^{2})
  - Water: 0.0039 sq mi (0.01 km^{2}) 0.31%
  - Rank: 506th of 565 in state 11th of 12 in county
- Elevation: 210 ft (64 m)

Population (2020)
  - Total: 2,802
  - Estimate (2023): 2,840
  - Rank: 454th of 565 in state 11th of 12 in county
  - Density: 2,916/sq mi (1,126/km^{2})
  - Rank: 222nd of 565 in state 3rd of 12 in county
- Time zone: UTC−05:00 (Eastern (EST))
  - Summer (DST): UTC−04:00 (Eastern (EDT))
- ZIP Code: 08534
- Area code: 609
- FIPS code: 3402157600
- GNIS feature ID: 885347
- Website: www.penningtonboro.org

Pennington is a borough in Mercer County, in the U.S. state of New Jersey. The borough is located at the cross-roads between the Delaware Valley region to the southwest and the Raritan Valley region to the northeast. As of the 2020 United States census, the borough's population was 2,802, its highest decennial count ever and an increase of 217 (+8.4%) from the 2010 census count of 2,585, which in turn had reflected a decline of 111 (−4.1%) from the 2,696 counted in the 2000 census.

== History ==
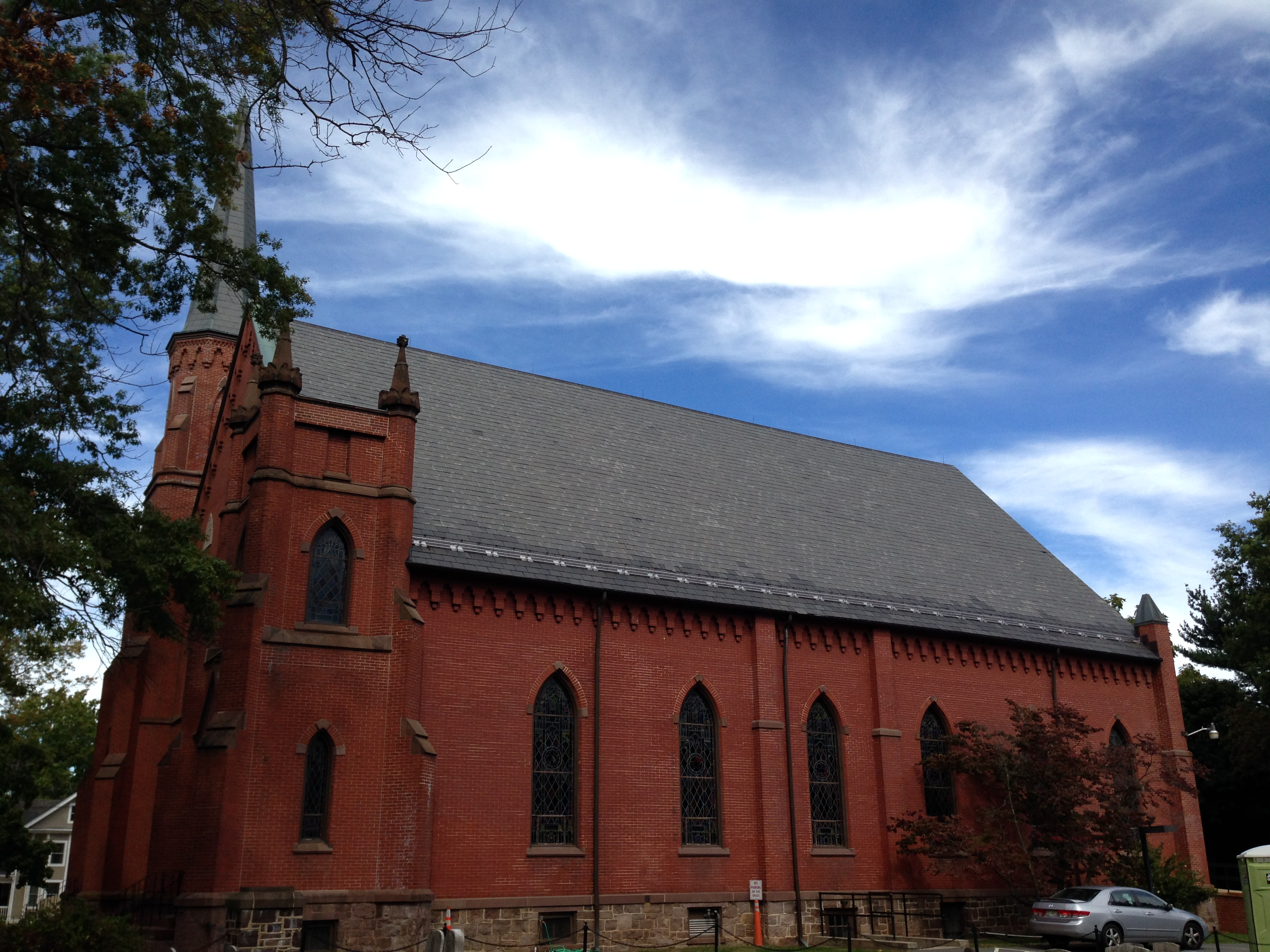
Historic First Presbyterian Church in Pennington

According to an 1883 history, "the first name of the village was Queenstown, which was given it in honor of Queen Anne. Later it was by some, in derision of its comparative insignificance, Pennytown, and as early as 1747 it began to be called Pennington." The name "Penington" was already known in the area, as Edward Penington (1667–1701), son of the British Quaker leader Isaac Penington, was appointed by his kinsman William Penn as Surveyor General of Pennsylvania. His father-in-law was a longtime leader, including as governor, of the province of West Jersey, where Edward married. Henry Gannett attributes the borough's name to colonial governors from the Pennington family.

Pennington was established as a borough by an act of the New Jersey Legislature on January 31, 1890, from portions of Hopewell Township, based on the results of a referendum held on January 21, 1890. It is a dry borough, where alcohol cannot be sold.

== Geography ==
According to the United States Census Bureau, the borough had a total area of 0.96 square miles (2.50 km^{2}), including 0.96 square miles (2.49 km^{2}) of land and <0.01 square miles (0.01 km^{2}) of water (0.31%).

The borough is an independent municipality completely surrounded by Hopewell Township, making it part one of 21 pairs of "doughnut towns" in the state, where one municipality entirely surrounds another.

== Demographics ==
Historical population
Census	Pop.	Note	%±
1880	723		—
1890	588		−18.7%
1900	733		24.7%
1910	722		−1.5%
1920	1,335		84.9%
1930	1,335		0.0%
1940	1,492		11.8%
1950	1,682		12.7%
1960	2,063		22.7%
1970	2,151		4.3%
1980	2,109		−2.0%
1990	2,537		20.3%
2000	2,696		6.3%
2010	2,585		−4.1%
2020	2,802		8.4%
2023 (est.)	2,840	▲	1.4%
Population sources: 1880–1890 1890–1920; 1890–1910 1910–1930; 1940–2000; 2010 2020

=== 2020 census ===
As of the 2020 census, Pennington had a population of 2,802. The median age was 45.5 years. 24.7% of residents were under the age of 18 and 22.2% of residents were 65 years of age or older. For every 100 females there were 87.9 males, and for every 100 females age 18 and over there were 81.7 males age 18 and over.

100.0% of residents lived in urban areas, while 0.0% lived in rural areas.

There were 1,028 households in Pennington, of which 37.9% had children under the age of 18 living in them. Of all households, 61.0% were married-couple households, 9.3% were households with a male householder and no spouse or partner present, and 26.6% were households with a female householder and no spouse or partner present. About 23.8% of all households were made up of individuals and 16.0% had someone living alone who was 65 years of age or older.

There were 1,088 housing units, of which 5.5% were vacant. The homeowner vacancy rate was 1.9% and the rental vacancy rate was 4.9%.

Racial composition as of the 2020 census
Race	Number	Percent
White	2,498	89.2%
Black or African American	49	1.7%
American Indian and Alaska Native	8	0.3%
Asian	83	3.0%
Native Hawaiian and Other Pacific Islander	0	0.0%
Some other race	17	0.6%
Two or more races	147	5.2%
Hispanic or Latino (of any race)	88	3.1%

=== 2010 census ===
The 2010 United States census counted 2,585 people, 1,031 households, and 712 families in the borough. The population density was 2,703.9 per square mile (1,044.0/km^{2}). There were 1,083 housing units at an average density of 1,132.8 per square mile (437.4/km^{2}). The racial makeup was 95.24% (2,462) White, 1.82% (47) Black or African American, 0.00% (0) Native American, 1.78% (46) Asian, 0.08% (2) Pacific Islander, 0.08% (2) from other races, and 1.01% (26) from two or more races. Hispanic or Latino of any race were 1.43% (37) of the population.

Of the 1,031 households, 34.9% had children under the age of 18; 60.4% were married couples living together; 6.6% had a female householder with no husband present and 30.9% were non-families. Of all households, 28.4% were made up of individuals and 19.0% had someone living alone who was 65 years of age or older. The average household size was 2.45 and the average family size was 3.04.

26.4% of the population were under the age of 18, 4.5% from 18 to 24, 17.9% from 25 to 44, 33.4% from 45 to 64, and 17.8% who were 65 years of age or older. The median age was 45.7 years. For every 100 females, the population had 87.7 males. For every 100 females ages 18 and older there were 79.4 males.

The Census Bureau's 2006–2010 American Community Survey showed that (in 2010 inflation-adjusted dollars) median household income was $107,250 (with a margin of error of +/− $18,509) and the median family income was $156,923 (+/− $18,294). Males had a median income of $106,250 (+/− $20,859) versus $76,477 (+/− $25,432) for females. The per capita income for the borough was $56,962 (+/− $6,372). About 6.2% of families and 6.0% of the population were below the poverty line, including 11.2% of those under age 18 and 2.9% of those age 65 or over.

=== 2000 census ===
As of the 2000 United States census there were 2,696 people, 1,013 households, and 761 families residing in the borough. The population density was 2,801.0 inhabitants per square mile (1,081.5/km^{2}). There were 1,040 housing units at an average density of 1,080.5 per square mile (417.2/km^{2}). The racial makeup of the borough was 94.96% White, 2.63% African American, 1.00% Asian, 0.41% from other races, and 1.00% from two or more races. Hispanic or Latino of any race were 1.19% of the population.

There were 1,013 households, out of which 40.8% had children under the age of 18 living with them, 66.2% were married couples living together, 7.1% had a female householder with no husband present, and 24.8% were non-families. 22.0% of all households were made up of individuals, and 12.4% had someone living alone who was 65 years of age or older. The average household size was 2.66 and the average family size was 3.14.

In the borough the population was spread out, with 28.7% under the age of 18, 4.9% from 18 to 24, 23.6% from 25 to 44, 27.9% from 45 to 64, and 15.0% who were 65 years of age or older. The median age was 41 years. For every 100 females, there were 92.2 males. For every 100 females age 18 and over, there were 85.0 males.

The median income for a household in the borough was $90,366, and the median income for a family was $107,089. Males had a median income of $84,912 versus $43,068 for females. The per capita income for the borough was $45,843. About 0.7% of families and 2.4% of the population were below the poverty line, including 1.4% of those under age 18 and 4.1% of those age 65 or over.

== Arts and culture ==
Pennington Day, typically in the middle of May, is an annual event where local organizations and businesses set up booths in a street-fair style on Main Street. The event, with origins back to 1980, features local music and a parade early in the day and festivities continuing into the afternoon.

== Government ==
=== Local government ===
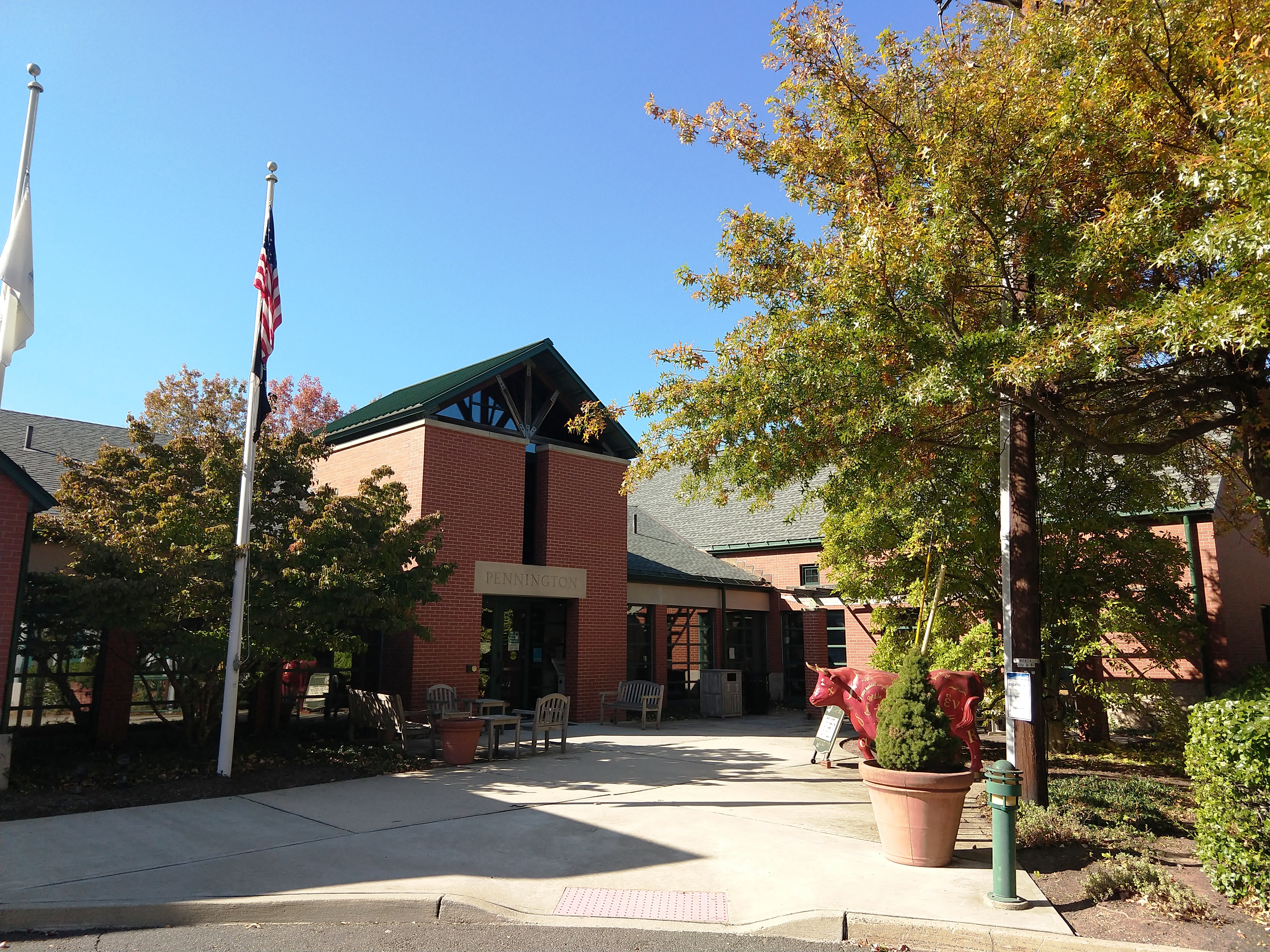
Pennington Borough Hall and Public Library

Pennington is governed under the borough form of New Jersey municipal government, which is used in 218 municipalities (of the 564) statewide, making it the most common form of government in New Jersey. The governing body is comprised of a mayor and a borough council, with all positions elected at-large on a partisan basis as part of the November general election. A mayor is elected directly by the voters to a four-year term of office. The borough council includes six members, who are elected to serve three-year terms on a staggered basis, with two seats coming up for election each year in a three-year cycle. The borough form of government used by Pennington is a "weak mayor / strong council" government in which council members act as the legislative body with the mayor presiding at meetings and voting only in the event of a tie. The mayor can veto ordinances subject to an override by a two-thirds majority vote of the council. The mayor makes committee and liaison assignments for council members, and most appointments are made by the mayor with the advice and consent of the council. The borough council has the option to designate an administrator or assign executive responsibilities to the administrator. The council may also adopt an administrative code which describes how the Council performs its duties.

As of 2023, the mayor of Pennington is Democrat James Davy, who was elected to serve an unexpired term of office ending December 31, 2023. Members of the Borough Council are Council President Catherine M. "Kit" Chandler (D, 2023), Katrina Angarone (D, 2025), Deborah L. Gnatt (D, 2024), Charles "Chico" Marciante (D, 2025), Nadine Stern (D, 2024) and John Valenza (D, 2023; appointed to serve an unexpired term).

In February 2023, the council selected John Valenza to fill the seat that had been held by Ken Gross expiring in December 2023 that became vacant when he resigned.

Katrina Angarone was selected in February 2022 from a list of three names submitted by the Democratic municipal committee to fill the seat expiring in December 2022 that had been held by Beverly Mills until her resignation from office the previous month.

In June 2021, the borough council appointed former councilmember James Davy to fill the mayoral seat expiring in December 2023 that became vacant following the resignation of Joseph Lawver earlier that month. Davy served on an interim basis until the November 2021 general election, when he was elected to serve the remainder of the term of office.

In January 2019, Joseph Lawver was appointed to fill the mayoral seat expiring in December 2019 that was vacated by Anthony Persichilli, the borough's longest-serving mayor, when he resigned from office the previous month. Former mayor Persichilli was first elected on November 7, 2006, to fill the vacancy left by the resignation of James Loper. Returned to office at that same election were Democratic council members Joseph Lawver and Eileen Heinzel. James Loper, the previous elected mayor, had resigned from office effective February 1, 2006. The Pennington Republican Committee nominated three candidates to take his place and the council selected James Benton from the three candidates to fill the vacancy. That same procedure was repeated in December 2006, when the borough council selected Diane Zompa to fill the unexpired term left by Persichilli.

=== Federal, state and county representation ===
Pennington is located in the 12th Congressional District and is part of New Jersey's 15th state legislative district.

For the 119th United States Congress, New Jersey's 12th congressional district is represented by Bonnie Watson Coleman (D, Ewing Township). New Jersey is represented in the United States Senate by Democrats Cory Booker (Newark, term ends 2027) and Andy Kim (Moorestown, term ends 2031).

For the 2026–2027 session, the 15th legislative district of the New Jersey Legislature is represented in the State Senate by Shirley Turner (D, Lawrence Township) and in the General Assembly by Verlina Reynolds-Jackson (D, Trenton) and Anthony Verrelli (D, Hopewell Township).

Mercer County is governed by a County Executive who oversees the day-to-day operations of the county and by a seven-member Board of County Commissioners that acts in a legislative capacity, setting policy. All officials are chosen at-large in partisan elections, with the executive serving a four-year term of office while the commissioners serve three-year terms of office on a staggered basis, with either two or three seats up for election each year as part of the November general election. As of 2025, the County Executive is Daniel R. Benson (D, Hamilton Township) whose term of office ends December 31, 2027. Mercer County's Commissioners are:

Lucylle R. S. Walter (D, Ewing Township, 2026), Chair John A. Cimino (D, Hamilton Township, 2026), Samuel T. Frisby Sr. (D, Trenton, 2027), Cathleen M. Lewis (D, Lawrence Township, 2025), Vice Chair Kristin L. McLaughlin (D, Hopewell Township, 2027), Nina D. Melker (D, Hamilton Township, 2025) and Terrance Stokes (D, Ewing Township, 2027).

Mercer County's constitutional officers are: Clerk Paula Sollami-Covello (D, Lawrence Township, 2025), Sheriff John A. Kemler (D, Hamilton Township, 2026) and Surrogate Diane Gerofsky (D, Lawrence Township, 2026).

=== Politics ===
As of March 2011, there were a total of 2,017 registered voters in Pennington, of which 828 (41.1%) were registered as Democrats, 467 (23.2%) were registered as Republicans and 720 (35.7%) were registered as Unaffiliated. There were 2 voters registered as either Libertarians or Greens.

United States presidential election results for Pennington
Year	Republican		Democratic		Third party(ies)	
Year	No.	%	No.	%	No.	%
2024	340	19.80%	1,353	78.80%	24	1.40%
2020	349	19.10%	1,453	79.53%	25	1.37%
2016	309	20.29%	1,149	75.44%	65	4.27%
2012	488	32.71%	985	66.02%	19	1.27%
2008	506	31.35%	1,090	67.53%	18	1.12%
2004	581	36.52%	999	62.79%	11	0.69%

In the 2012 presidential election, Democrat Barack Obama received 66.0% of the vote (985 cast), ahead of Republican Mitt Romney with 32.7% (488 votes), and other candidates with 1.3% (19 votes), among the 1,653 ballots cast by the borough's 2,115 registered voters (161 ballots were spoiled), for a turnout of 78.2%. In the 2008 presidential election, Democrat Barack Obama received 66.9% of the vote (1,090 cast), ahead of Republican John McCain with 31.0% (506 votes) and other candidates with 1.1% (18 votes), among the 1,630 ballots cast by the borough's 2,088 registered voters, for a turnout of 78.1%. In the 2004 presidential election, Democrat John Kerry received 61.7% of the vote (999 ballots cast), outpolling Republican George W. Bush with 35.9% (581 votes) and other candidates with 0.5% (11 votes), among the 1,619 ballots cast by the borough's 2,022 registered voters, for a turnout percentage of 80.1.

Gubernatorial election results for Pennington
Year	Republican		Democratic		Third party(ies)	
Year	No.	%	No.	%	No.	%
2025	308	20.45%	1,192	79.15%	6	0.40%
2021	290	23.93%	914	75.41%	8	0.66%
2017	296	28.33%	730	69.86%	19	1.82%
2013	496	49.65%	487	48.75%	16	1.60%
2009	425	36.05%	640	54.28%	114	9.67%
2005	460	40.24%	649	56.78%	34	2.97%

In the 2013 gubernatorial election, Republican Chris Christie received 49.6% of the vote (496 cast), ahead of Democrat Barbara Buono with 48.7% (487 votes), and other candidates with 1.6% (16 votes), among the 1,015 ballots cast by the borough's 2,067 registered voters (16 ballots were spoiled), for a turnout of 49.1%. In the 2009 gubernatorial election, Democrat Jon Corzine received 53.8% of the vote (640 ballots cast), ahead of Republican Chris Christie with 35.7% (425 votes), Independent Chris Daggett with 9.3% (111 votes) and other candidates with 0.3% (3 votes), among the 1,190 ballots cast by the borough's 2,057 registered voters, yielding a 57.9% turnout.

United States Senate election results for Pennington1
Year	Republican		Democratic		Third party(ies)	
Year	No.	%	No.	%	No.	%
2024	352	20.75%	1,323	78.01%	21	1.24%
2018	333	28.66%	777	66.87%	52	4.48%
2012	484	33.61%	929	64.51%	27	1.88%
2006	459	37.26%	744	60.39%	29	2.35%

United States Senate election results for Pennington2
Year	Republican		Democratic		Third party(ies)	
Year	No.	%	No.	%	No.	%
2020	413	22.97%	1,374	76.42%	11	0.61%
2014	298	32.15%	615	66.34%	14	1.51%
2013	206	28.73%	497	69.32%	14	1.95%
2008	609	39.67%	903	58.83%	23	1.50%

== Education ==
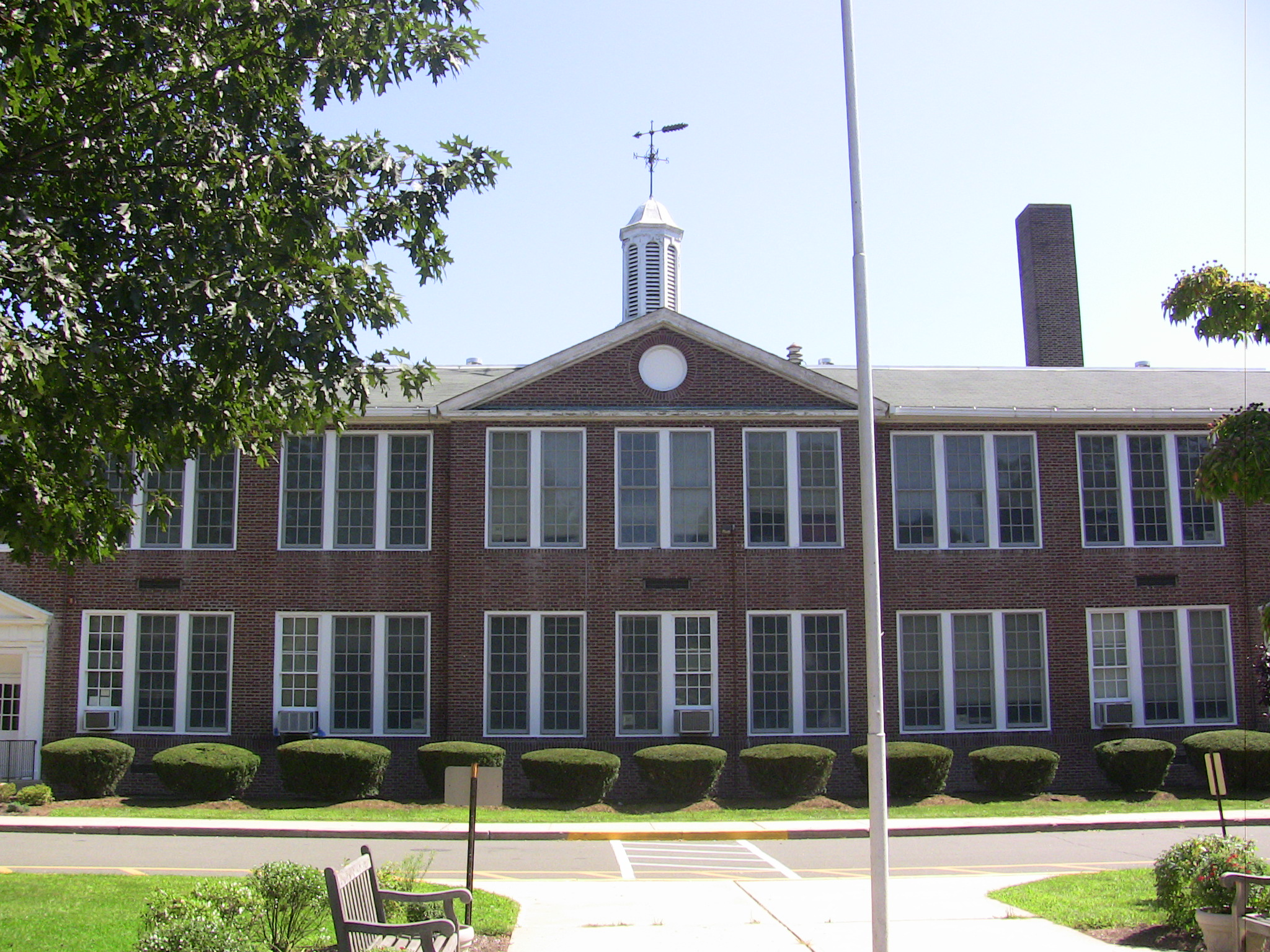
Toll Gate Grammar School

Public school students in pre-kindergarten through twelfth grade attend the Hopewell Valley Regional School District. The comprehensive regional public school district serves students from Hopewell Borough, Hopewell Township and Pennington Borough. As of the 2019–20 school year, the district, comprised of six schools, had an enrollment of 3,467 students and 351.1 classroom teachers (on an FTE basis), for a student–teacher ratio of 9.9:1. Schools in the district (with 2019–20 enrollment data from the National Center for Education Statistics) are Bear Tavern Elementary School with 397 students in grades Pre-K–5, Hopewell Elementary School with 400 students in grades Pre-K–5, Stony Brook Elementary School with 378 students in grades K–5, Toll Gate Grammar School with 306 students in grades K–5, Timberlane Middle School with 820 students in grades 6–8 and Hopewell Valley Central High School with 1,097 students in grades 9–12. The district's board of education is comprised of nine members allocated to each of the three municipalities based on population, with Pennington assigned a single seat.

Eighth grade students from all of Mercer County are eligible to apply to attend the high school programs offered by the Mercer County Technical Schools, a county-wide vocational school district that offers full-time career and technical education at its Health Sciences Academy, STEM Academy and Academy of Culinary Arts, with no tuition charged to students for attendance.

The Pennington School serves students in sixth through twelfth grades, having been founded in 1838 with a single teacher and three students.

== Transportation ==
=== Roads and highways ===
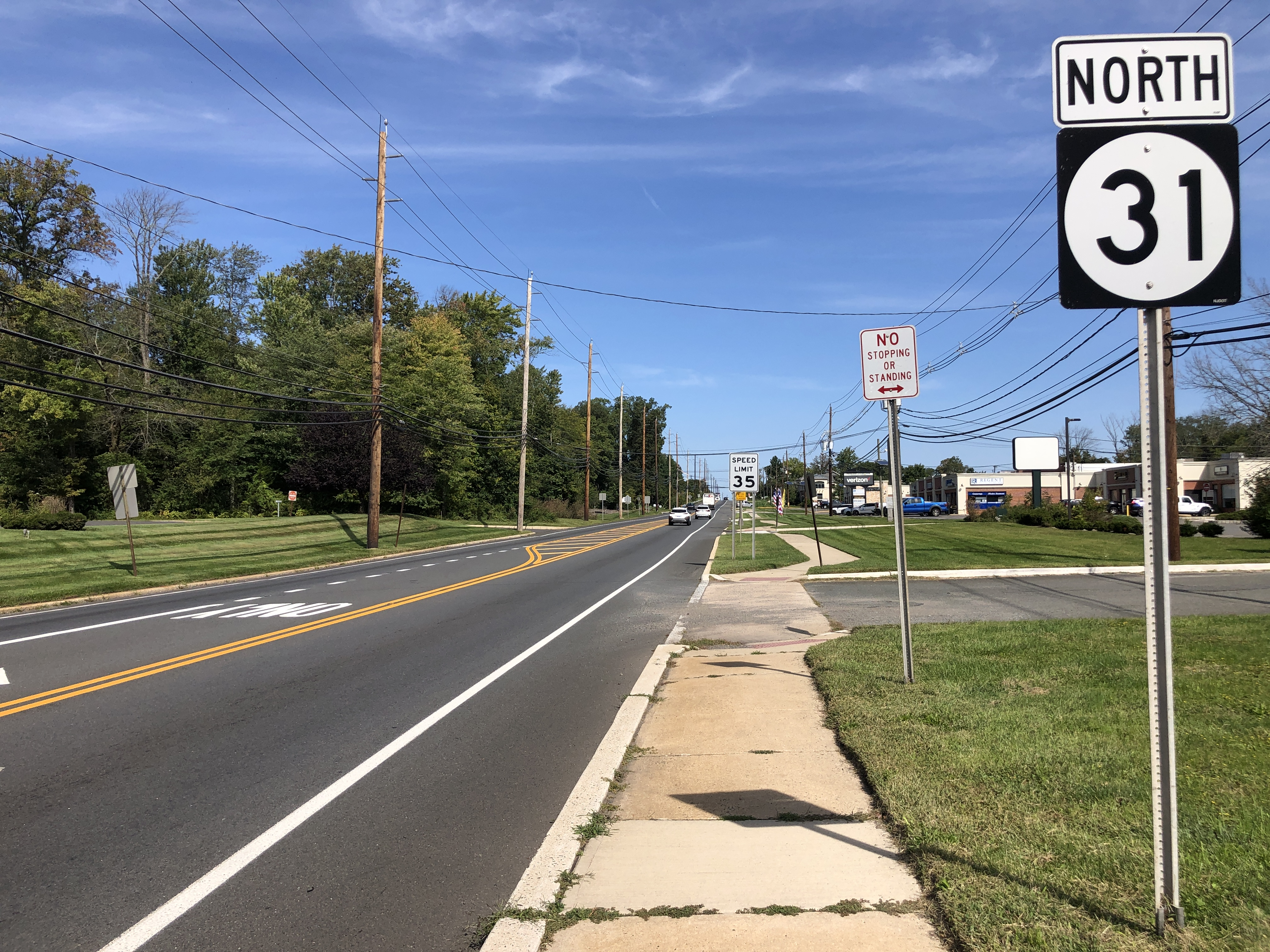
Route 31 is the primary state highway serving Pennington

As of May 2010, the borough had a total of 12.34 miles (19.86 km) of roadways, of which 8.57 miles (13.79 km) were maintained by the municipality, 3.17 miles (5.10 km) by Mercer County and 0.60 miles (0.97 km) by the New Jersey Department of Transportation.

Route 31 passes through Pennington, providing access to Interstate 295 at exit 72. Additionally, exit 73 along I-295 connects to Scotch Road North, which provides access to all of the surrounding Hopewell Township area.

=== Public transportation ===
NJ Transit provides bus service between the borough and Trenton on the 624 route.

== Climate ==
According to the Köppen climate classification system, Pennington Borough has a Hot-summer Humid continental climate (Dfa).

Climate data for Pennington Borough (40.2954, -74.7205), 1991-2020 normals, extremes 1981-2024
Month	Jan	Feb	Mar	Apr	May	Jun	Jul	Aug	Sep	Oct	Nov	Dec	Year
Record high °F (°C)	71.1 (21.7)	77.5 (25.3)	87.7 (30.9)	94.4 (34.7)	94.9 (34.9)	97.3 (36.3)	103.0 (39.4)	99.2 (37.3)	96.9 (36.1)	92.8 (33.8)	80.6 (27.0)	75.4 (24.1)	103.0 (39.4)
Mean daily maximum °F (°C)	39.7 (4.3)	42.2 (5.7)	50.2 (10.1)	62.4 (16.9)	71.9 (22.2)	81.0 (27.2)	85.8 (29.9)	84.0 (28.9)	77.5 (25.3)	65.5 (18.6)	54.7 (12.6)	44.6 (7.0)	63.4 (17.4)
Daily mean °F (°C)	31.2 (−0.4)	33.1 (0.6)	40.6 (4.8)	51.7 (10.9)	61.4 (16.3)	70.5 (21.4)	75.5 (24.2)	73.7 (23.2)	66.9 (19.4)	55.1 (12.8)	44.8 (7.1)	36.2 (2.3)	53.5 (11.9)
Mean daily minimum °F (°C)	22.6 (−5.2)	24.1 (−4.4)	31.0 (−0.6)	41.0 (5.0)	50.9 (10.5)	60.0 (15.6)	65.2 (18.4)	63.4 (17.4)	56.4 (13.6)	44.7 (7.1)	34.9 (1.6)	27.8 (−2.3)	43.6 (6.4)
Record low °F (°C)	−11.1 (−23.9)	−1.9 (−18.8)	4.0 (−15.6)	17.9 (−7.8)	32.2 (0.1)	41.7 (5.4)	48.4 (9.1)	41.9 (5.5)	36.5 (2.5)	24.6 (−4.1)	10.4 (−12.0)	0.0 (−17.8)	−11.1 (−23.9)
Average precipitation inches (mm)	3.60 (91)	2.83 (72)	4.21 (107)	3.75 (95)	4.11 (104)	4.50 (114)	4.93 (125)	4.49 (114)	4.23 (107)	4.18 (106)	3.38 (86)	4.43 (113)	48.64 (1,235)
Average snowfall inches (cm)	8.3 (21)	8.7 (22)	3.8 (9.7)	0.1 (0.25)	0.0 (0.0)	0.0 (0.0)	0.0 (0.0)	0.0 (0.0)	0.0 (0.0)	0.2 (0.51)	0.6 (1.5)	3.4 (8.6)	25.3 (64)
Average dew point °F (°C)	21.2 (−6.0)	21.7 (−5.7)	27.2 (−2.7)	36.9 (2.7)	48.9 (9.4)	59.2 (15.1)	63.9 (17.7)	63.2 (17.3)	57.2 (14.0)	45.8 (7.7)	34.4 (1.3)	26.8 (−2.9)	42.3 (5.7)
Source 1: PRISM
Source 2: NOHRSC (Snow, 2008/2009 - 2024/2025 normals)

== Ecology ==
According to the A. W. Kuchler U.S. potential natural vegetation types, Pennington would have a dominant vegetation type of Appalachian Oak (104) with a dominant vegetation form of Eastern Hardwood Forest (25).

== Points of interest ==
- Hopewell Valley Central High School
- Hopewell Valley Vineyards
- First Presbyterian Church
- Pennington Railroad Station – Constructed in 1882 by the Reading Railroad, the Victorian-style station is located along the West Trenton Line, on which NJ Transit has plans to offer commuter service, though not at this station. The structure was added to the National Register of Historic Places on December 31, 1974.
- The Pennington School
- Toll Gate Grammar school and the original Central High School. Both date to the 1920s
- Pennington Fire Company

== Notable people ==
People who were born in, residents of, or otherwise closely associated with Pennington include:

- Val Ackerman (born 1959), first president of the Women's National Basketball Association, serving from 1996 to 2005 The Central High School's old gymnasium is named after her father, G. Randall Ackerman
- Svetlana Alliluyeva (1926–2011), daughter of Joseph Stalin who became an international sensation when she defected to the United States in 1967
- Kwame Anthony Appiah (born 1954), philosopher
- Frank Baldwin (1880–1959), Rear admiral in the United States Navy
- Nicole Baxter (born 1994), professional soccer player who played midfielder for the National Women's Soccer League club Sky Blue FC
- Peter Benchley (1940–2006), author of the novel and film Jaws
- Wendy Benchley (born 1941), marine and environmental conservation advocate and former councilwoman from New Jersey who was the wife of author Peter Benchley
- Grant Billmeier (born 1984), former professional basketball player who has been head coach of the NJIT Highlanders men's basketball team
- Bob Bradley (born 1958), former Major League Soccer head coach, who was head coach of the United States national football team and Egypt national football team
- Michael Bradley (born 1987), son of former US Men's National Soccer Team coach Bob Bradley and professional soccer player who currently plays for Toronto F.C. in Major League Soccer
- Anne Canby, transportation official who served in the cabinet of Governor Brendan Byrne as the New Jersey Commissioner of Transportation from 1981 to 1982 and in the cabinet of Governor Thomas R. Carper as the Delaware Secretary of Transportation from 1993 to 2001
- Simon Carcagno (born 1976), rower who competed in lightweight rowing and won a gold medal in the eights at the 2008 World Rowing Championships
- George Councell (1949–2018), 11th bishop of the Episcopal Diocese of New Jersey, serving in the position from 2003 to 2013
- James Davy (born 1953), former New Jersey Commissioner of Human Services under Governors James McGreevey and Jon Corzine
- Lucille Davy, former commissioner of the New Jersey Department of Education
- Tony DeNicola (1927–2006), jazz drummer
- Sarah Corson Downs (1822–1891), temperance activist and social reformer
- Olga Gorelli (1920–2006), composer and pianist
- Jim Himes (born 1966), U.S. Representative from Connecticut's 4th congressional district
- Cassidy Hutchinson (born 1996), aide to White House Chief of Staff Mark Meadows during the firstTrump administration who testified at a hearing of the United States House Select Committee on the January 6 Attack
- Joan Mellen (1941–2025), writer and professor of English and creative writing
- Samuel Messick (1931–1998), psychologist who worked for the Educational Testing Service
- Liz Miele (born 1985), stand-up comedian and writer
- Kenneth G. Miller (born 1956), geologist at Rutgers University who has written and lectured on global warming and sea level change
- Elizabeth Maher Muoio, Treasurer of New Jersey, who had served in the New Jersey General Assembly and was a councilwoman from 1997 to 2001
- Cal Newport, nonfiction author and full-time professor of computer science at Georgetown University
- Sue Niederer, political activist
- Judith Persichilli (born 1949), nurse and health care executive who has served as the commissioner of the New Jersey Department of Health
- William E. Schluter (1927–2018), politician who served in the New Jersey General Assembly and State Senate
- John Tanguay (born 1998), rower who won a silver medal at the 2019 World Rowing Championships
- Karl Weidel (1923–1997), member of the New Jersey General Assembly
