= West Trenton Line (disambiguation) =

West Trenton Line may refer to the following commuter rail lines:

- West Trenton Line, formerly known as the R3, running between Ewing, New Jersey and Philadelphia, Pennsylvania
- West Trenton Line (NJ Transit), a proposed line between Ewing and Bridgewater, New Jersey

== See also ==
- Trenton Line (disambiguation)
