= Belle Mead, New Jersey =

Populated place in Somerset County, New Jersey, US

- Census-designated place
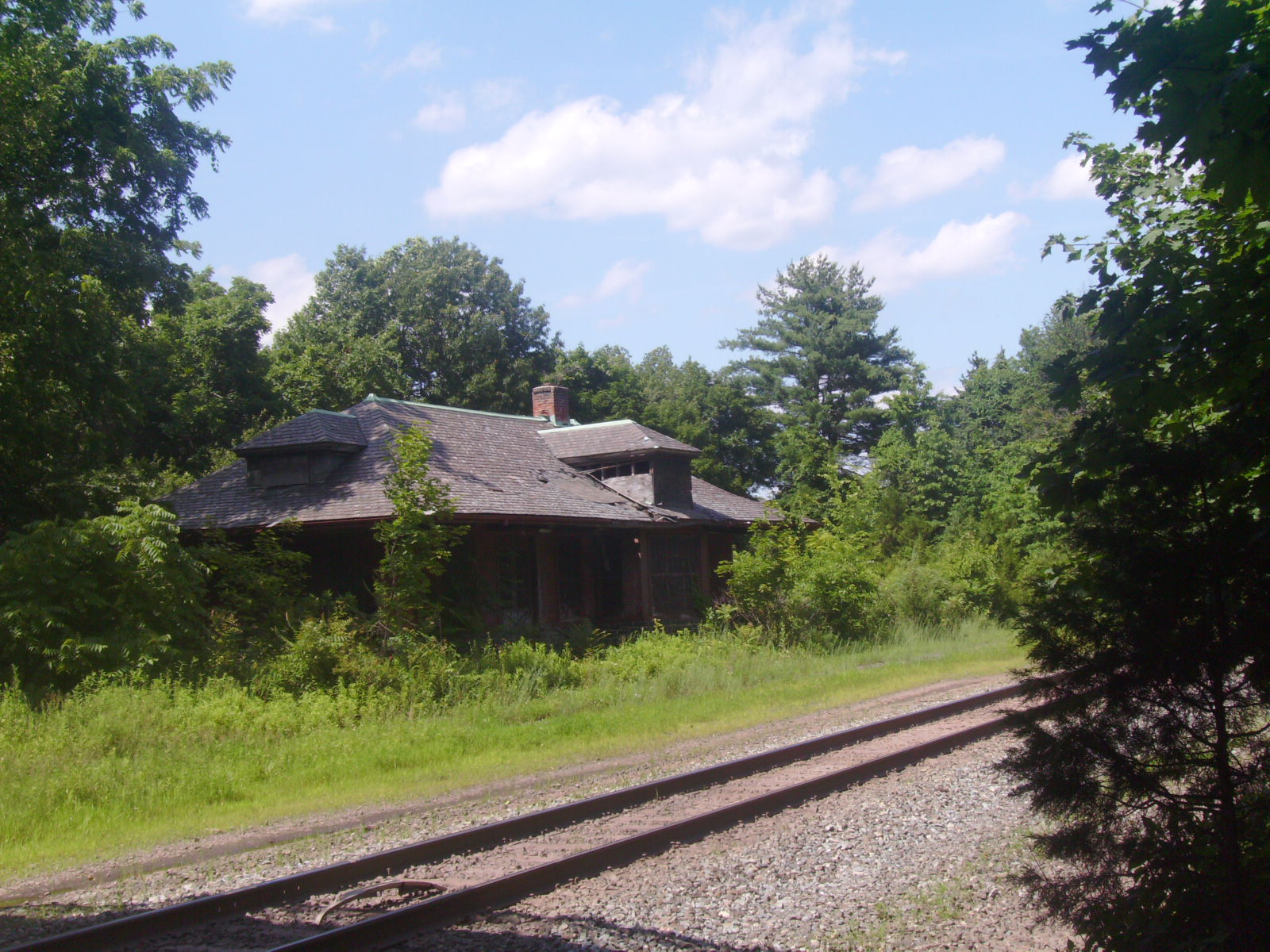
- The former Belle Mead railroad station located along the former Reading Railroad (as a part of the proposed West Trenton Line)

- Location in Somerset County Location in New Jersey Location in the United States
- Coordinates: 40.462445°N 74.6744°W
- Country: United States
- State: New Jersey
- County: Somerset
- Township: Montgomery

Area
  - Total: 4.03 sq mi (10.45 km^{2})
  - Land: 4.03 sq mi (10.44 km^{2})
  - Water: 0.0039 sq mi (0.01 km^{2}) 0.00%
- Elevation: 98 ft (30 m)

Population (2020)
  - Total: 5,569
  - Density: 1,381.6/sq mi (533.43/km^{2})
- Time zone: UTC−05:00 (Eastern (EST))
  - Summer (DST): UTC−04:00 (Eastern (EDT))
- ZIP Code: 08502
- Area code: 908
- FIPS code: 34-04630
- GNIS feature ID: 02583967

Belle Mead is an unincorporated community and census-designated place (CDP) located within Montgomery Township, in Somerset County, in the U.S. state of New Jersey. As of the 2020 United States census, the CDP's population was 5,569, reflecting an expansion of the CDP from 0.74 square miles (1.9 km^{2}) in 2010 to 4.03 square miles (10.4 km^{2}) in 2020.

== History ==
Up until about 1875, Belle Mead, then named Plainville, was considered to be part of the community of Harlingen. It was a quiet farming region when about that time a New York City contractor named Van Aken bought up all the local farms and set out to develop a city. He had the farms laid out into lots, some streets put through and named after the style of New York. He donated land for the railroad station that had a dining room underneath (the station was torn down in February, 1940). There is an abandoned train station in Belle Mead. When Van Aken went broke, the property was sold to a U.S. Senator, John R. McPherson, who changed the name from Vanaken to Belle Mead in honor of his daughter, Edna Belle Mead McPherson, according to one popular story.

Woods Tavern in Belle Mead was a popular stop for travelers for more than 100 years and played an important social and political role. Horace Greeley spoke there in 1872 as part of his campaign for President of the United States. The tavern burned down in 1932.

The Belle Mead Army Depot was the nation's largest military supply facility during WWII. The depot operated until 1991, and no buildings remain. Now a Superfund site, it is undergoing remediation and part is a county park. James Baldwin, the author and civil rights advocate, lived in Belle Mead in the early 1940s while working at the depot.

Dr. John Summerskill and his wife, Mimi LaFollette Summerskill established the LaFollette Vineyard in Belle Mead in the 1970s. President Bill Clinton and 14 Democratic governors met for a strategy session and press conference at the vineyard during the 1992 presidential campaign.

The abandoned train station was built by Reading Railroad in the 1930s, and was removed from service in 1984. Since then, restoration projects have been announced, but none have progressed any further than cleaning up tree debris and graffiti.

The Belle Mead section straddles the northern portion of Montgomery Township and the southern portion of Hillsborough Township. For many years residents of Belle Mead had been served by the Belle Mead Post Office located on Route 206 in Montgomery Township having ZIP code 08502. In the late 1990s, Hillsborough Township was granted its own post office serving all of its residents (ZIP code 08844), including that section of town formerly serving the Belle Mead area. Since that time the Belle Mead post office and its associated ZIP code (08502) serves only the remaining area of Belle Mead located in the northern section of Montgomery Township.

== Geography ==
According to the United States Census Bureau, Belle Mead had a total area of 0.740 square miles (1.917 km^{2}), all of which is land.

== Demographics ==
Historical population
Census	Pop.	Note	%±
2010	216		—
2020	5,569		2,478.2%
Population sources: 2010 2020

Bell Mead first appeared as a census designated place in the 2010 U.S. census.

Belle Mead is demographically notable for having the fastest-growing Asian population of any U.S. community as enumerated by the U.S. Census Bureau, increasing from four individuals in 2010 to a majority of its residents in 2020.

=== Racial and ethnic composition ===
Belle Mead CDP, New Jersey – Racial and ethnic composition Note: the US Census treats Hispanic/Latino as an ethnic category. This table excludes Latinos from the racial categories and assigns them to a separate category. Hispanics/Latinos may be of any race.
Race / Ethnicity (NH = Non-Hispanic)	Pop 2010	Pop 2020	% 2010	% 2020
White alone (NH)	191	1,584	88.43%	28.44%
Black or African American alone (NH)	2	309	0.93%	5.55%
Native American or Alaska Native alone (NH)	0	5	0.00%	0.09%
Asian alone (NH)	4	3,193	1.85%	57.34%
Native Hawaiian or Pacific Islander alone (NH)	0	3	0.00%	0.05%
Other race alone (NH)	0	24	0.00%	0.43%
Mixed race or Multiracial (NH)	1	133	0.46%	2.39%
Hispanic or Latino (any race)	18	318	8.33%	5.71%
Total	216	5,569	100.00%	100.00%

=== 2020 census ===
As of the 2020 census, Belle Mead had a population of 5,569. The median age was 39.1 years. 29.0% of residents were under the age of 18 and 7.9% of residents were 65 years of age or older. For every 100 females there were 95.7 males, and for every 100 females age 18 and over there were 91.2 males age 18 and over.

98.2% of residents lived in urban areas, while 1.8% lived in rural areas.

There were 1,841 households in Belle Mead, of which 49.8% had children under the age of 18 living in them. Of all households, 65.8% were married-couple households, 10.8% were households with a male householder and no spouse or partner present, and 20.4% were households with a female householder and no spouse or partner present. About 17.3% of all households were made up of individuals and 4.8% had someone living alone who was 65 years of age or older.

There were 1,926 housing units, of which 4.4% were vacant. The homeowner vacancy rate was 2.1% and the rental vacancy rate was 4.2%.

=== 2010 census ===
The 2010 United States census counted 216 people, 78 households, and 62 families in the CDP. The population density was 291.8 per square mile (112.7/km^{2}). There were 80 housing units at an average density of 108.1 per square mile (41.7/km^{2}). The racial makeup was 92.13% (199) White, 0.93% (2) Black or African American, 0.00% (0) Native American, 1.85% (4) Asian, 0.00% (0) Pacific Islander, 4.63% (10) from other races, and 0.46% (1) from two or more races. Hispanic or Latino of any race were 8.33% (18) of the population.

Of the 78 households, 39.7% had children under the age of 18; 71.8% were married couples living together; 5.1% had a female householder with no husband present and 20.5% were non-families. Of all households, 15.4% were made up of individuals and 7.7% had someone living alone who was 65 years of age or older. The average household size was 2.77 and the average family size was 3.03.

25.9% of the population were under the age of 18, 4.2% from 18 to 24, 25.9% from 25 to 44, 30.6% from 45 to 64, and 13.4% who were 65 years of age or older. The median age was 42.5 years. For every 100 females, the population had 100.0 males. For every 100 females ages 18 and older there were 102.5 males.

== Notable people ==
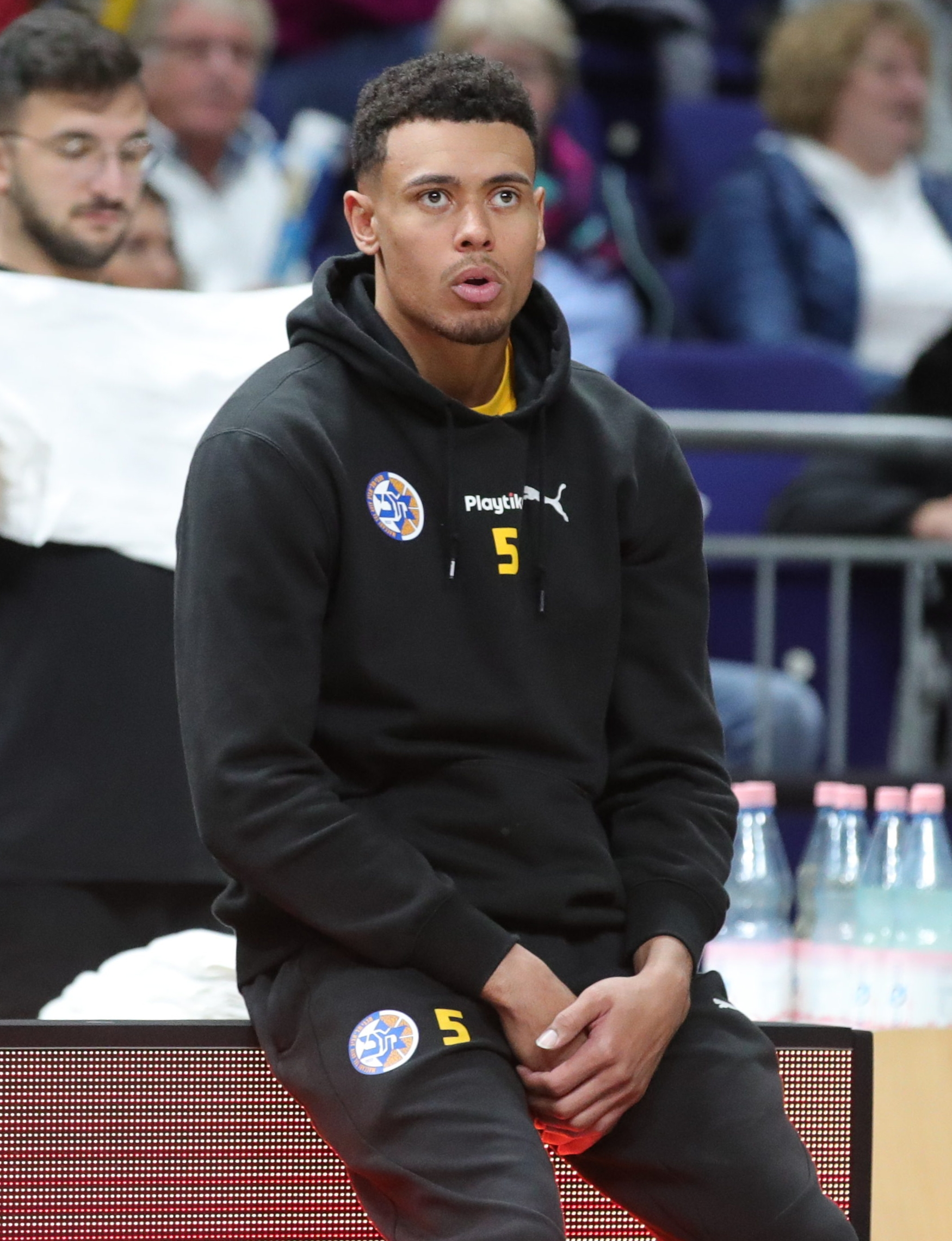
Wade Baldwin IV

People who were born in, residents of, or otherwise closely associated with Belle Mead include:

- Wade Baldwin IV (born 1996), basketball player for Maccabi Tel Aviv of the Israeli Basketball Premier League.
- Mike Ford (born 1992), first baseman for the Seattle Mariners.
- Brandon Grosso (born 2000), racecar driver in the ARCA Menards Series.
- Ricky Proehl (born 1968), wide receiver who played for 17 seasons in the NFL.
- Elliott F. Smith (1931–1987), politician who served in the New Jersey General Assembly from 1978 to 1984, representing the 16th Legislative District.
- Arlene White Lawrence (1916–1990), bishop and the third president and general superintendent of the Pillar of Fire Church.
