= Belle Mead station =

Railway station in Montgomery Township, US

Coordinates: 40.4675°N 74.6620°W

Belle Mead
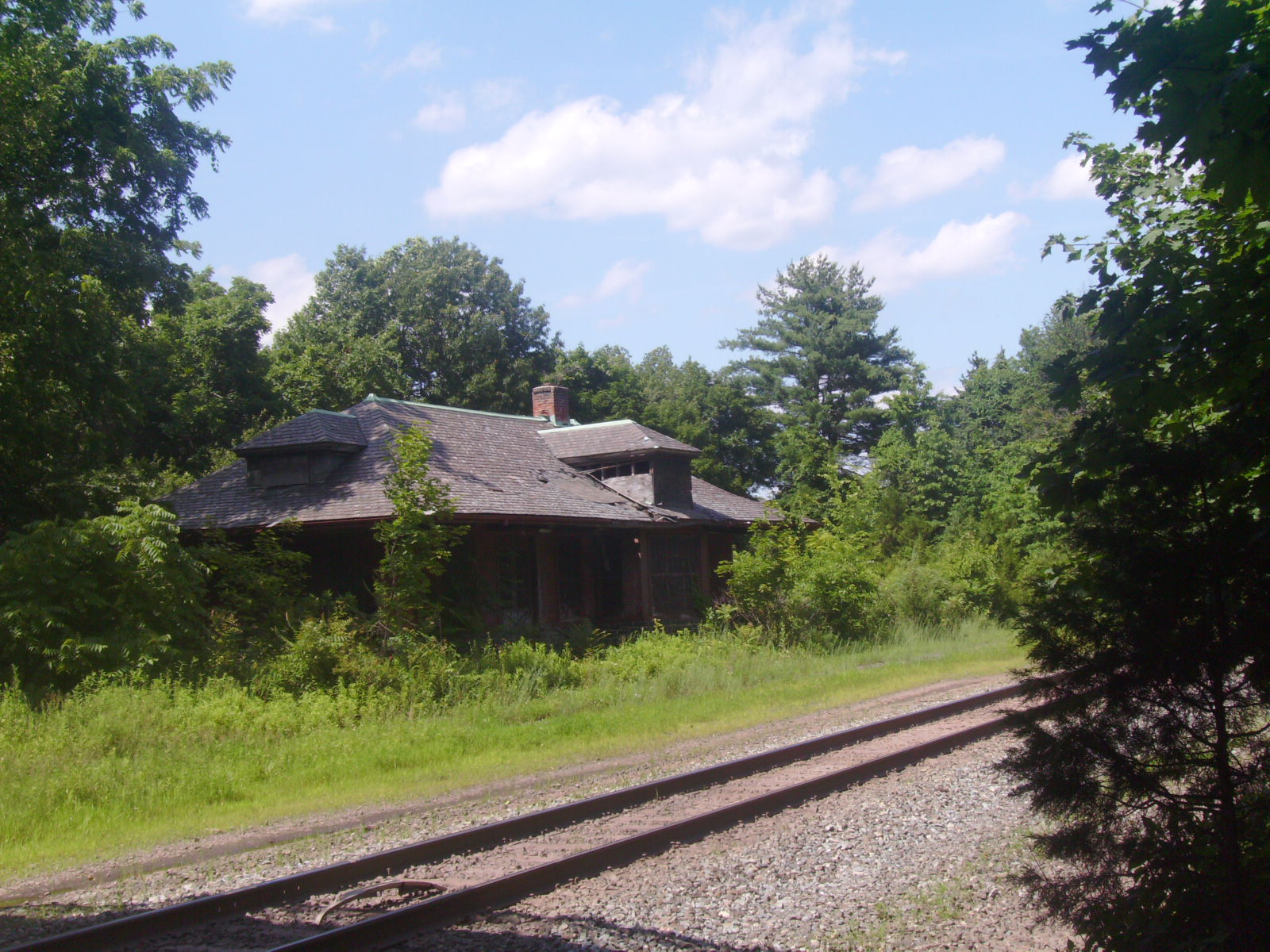
- The former Belle Mead Reading Railroad station.

History
- Closed: December 3, 1982
- Rebuilt: –December 8, 1919

Key dates
- October 1976: Station agent eliminated

Former services
Preceding station	Conrail	Following station
Hopewell toward Reading Terminal	Crusader and Wall Street 1976–1981	Bound Brook toward Newark
Hopewell toward West Trenton	West Trenton Line 1981–1982 (NJ Transit)	Bound Brook toward Newark
Preceding station	Reading Railroad	Following station
Harlingen toward Philadelphia	New York Branch	Hamilton toward Bound Brook
Location

Belle Mead station is a defunct commuter railroad station in the Belle Mead section of Montgomery Township, Somerset County, New Jersey. Located on U.S. Route 206 in Belle Mead, the station once served trains of the West Trenton Line, operated by Conrail. Prior to that, it served trains of the Reading Railroad, including the Crusader and Wall Street. Belle Mead station had two low-level side platforms with two station depots. The former station depots at Belle Mead remain, abandoned and derelict.

NJ Transit has proposed reviving service to Belle Mead via a reactivation of the West Trenton Line, which would connect West Trenton station and Bound Brook station, where it would join the Raritan Valley Line. The former line currently operates under CSX Transportation's Trenton Subdivision, which is freight only in New Jersey.

== History ==
The current station was built by the Reading Railroad, opening to the public on December 8, 1919. This replaced the older station which was built in the late 19th century. The current Belle Mead station was closed in 1981 and is still standing. New Jersey Transit may reopen the station as part of the proposed revival of the West Trenton Line. This station was expected to have the second largest ridership on the branch with 290 daily passengers. If the station were to be reopened, two small station buildings would be renovated. Commuter parking would possibly be located on the eastside of the right-of-way with access from Route 206 with 300 parking spaces. The intersection of Township Line Road and Route 206 would be improved along with replacement of the adjacent Route 206 bridge over the railroad.

Preservation New Jersey declared it one of the most endangered buildings in the state in 2019.
