= Admiral Baldwin =

Admiral Baldwin may refer to:

- Charles H. Baldwin (admiral) (1822–1888), U.S. Navy rear admiral
- Frank Baldwin (admiral) (1880–1959), U.S. Navy rear admiral
- John A. Baldwin Jr. (born 1933), U.S. Navy vice admiral
- Robert B. Baldwin (1923–2017), U.S. Navy vice admiral
