= Frank Baldwin (disambiguation) =

Frank Baldwin (1842–1923) was a U.S. Army general, twice recipient of the Medal of Honor.

Frank Baldwin may also refer to:

- Frank Baldwin (admiral) (1880–1959), American naval officer
- Frank Baldwin (baseball) (1928–2004), American baseball player
- Frank E. Baldwin (1866–1943), American politician
- Frank Stephen Baldwin (1838–1925), American inventor of a pinwheel calculator
- Frank "Frankie" Baldwin, a Coronation Street character
