= First Presbyterian Church (Pennington, New Jersey) =

Pennington Presbyterian Church
- First Presbyterian Church of Pennington
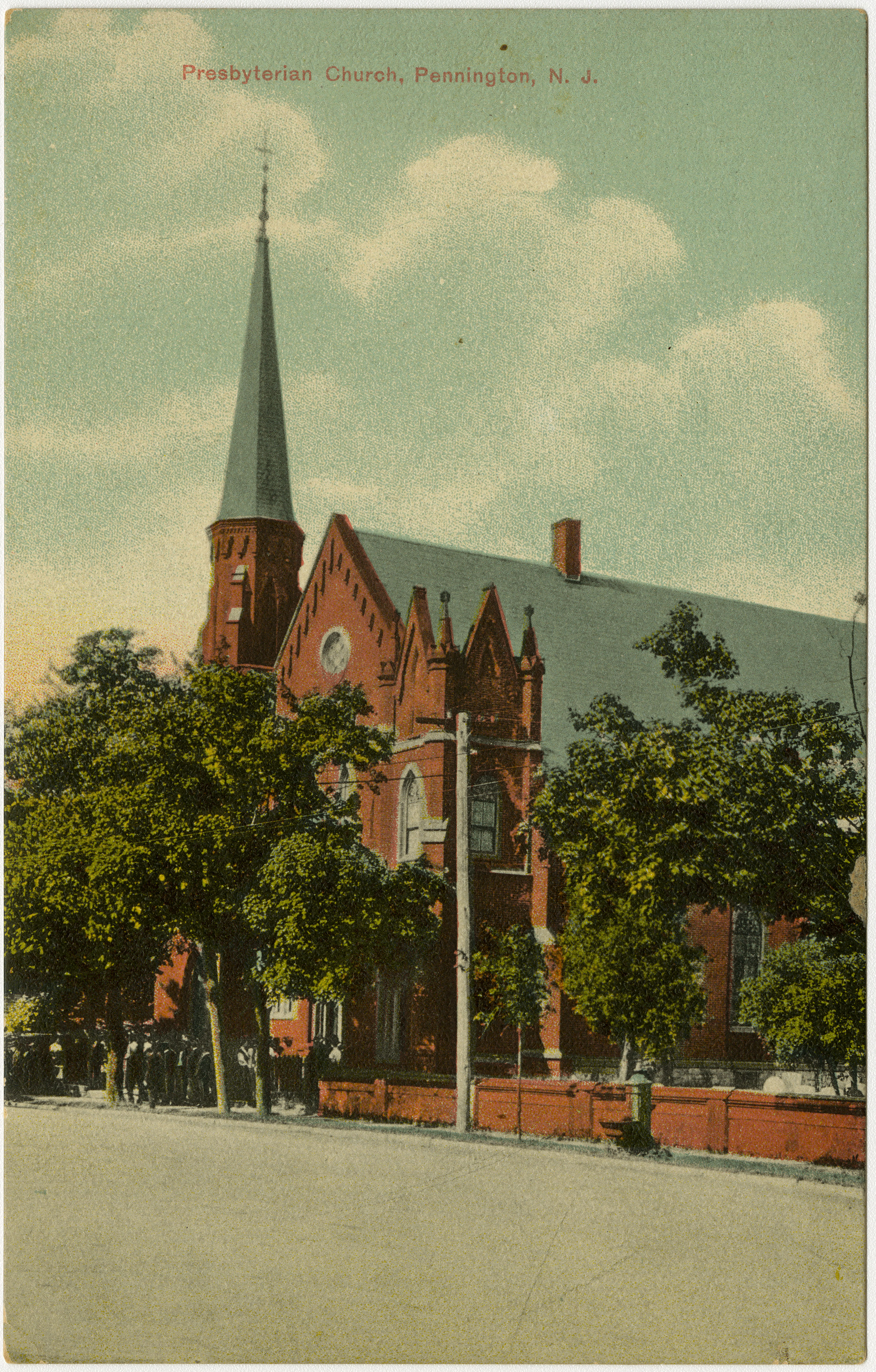
- A historic, pre-1923, postcard of Pennington Presbyterian Church
- Pennington Presbyterian Church
- Location: 13 South Main Street, Pennington, New Jersey
- Country: United States
- Denomination: Presbyterian Church (U.S.A.)
- Churchmanship: Mainline Protestant

History
- Founded: May, 1709
- Dedication: 1724 (original building), 1847 (second building), 1875 (current building)
- Events: British occupation (1776), Burned down (1874)

Specifications
- Materials: Associate Pastor. Rev. David Hallgren
- First Presbyterian Church of Pennington
- U.S. National Register of Historic Places
- New Jersey Register of Historic Places
- Location within Mercer County, New Jersey Location within New Jersey Location within the United States
- Coordinates: 40°19′38.9″N 74°47′26.2″W
- Architect: James Bird
- Architectural style: Victorian Gothic
- NRHP reference No.: 11000591
- NJRHP No.: 1727

Significant dates
- Added to NRHP: August 24, 2011
- Designated NJRHP: June 2, 2011

The First Presbyterian Church of Pennington, originally known as the Hopewell Presbyterian Church, is a historic congregation founded in 1709 in the borough of Pennington in Mercer County, New Jersey, United States. The current church building, located at 13 South Main Street, dates to 1875 after an 1847 Gothic structure burned down the previous year. It was added to the National Register of Historic Places on August 24, 2011 for its significance in architecture. The red brick building was designed by architect James Bird and features Victorian Gothic architecture. The listing also includes the cemetery on the south side of the church.

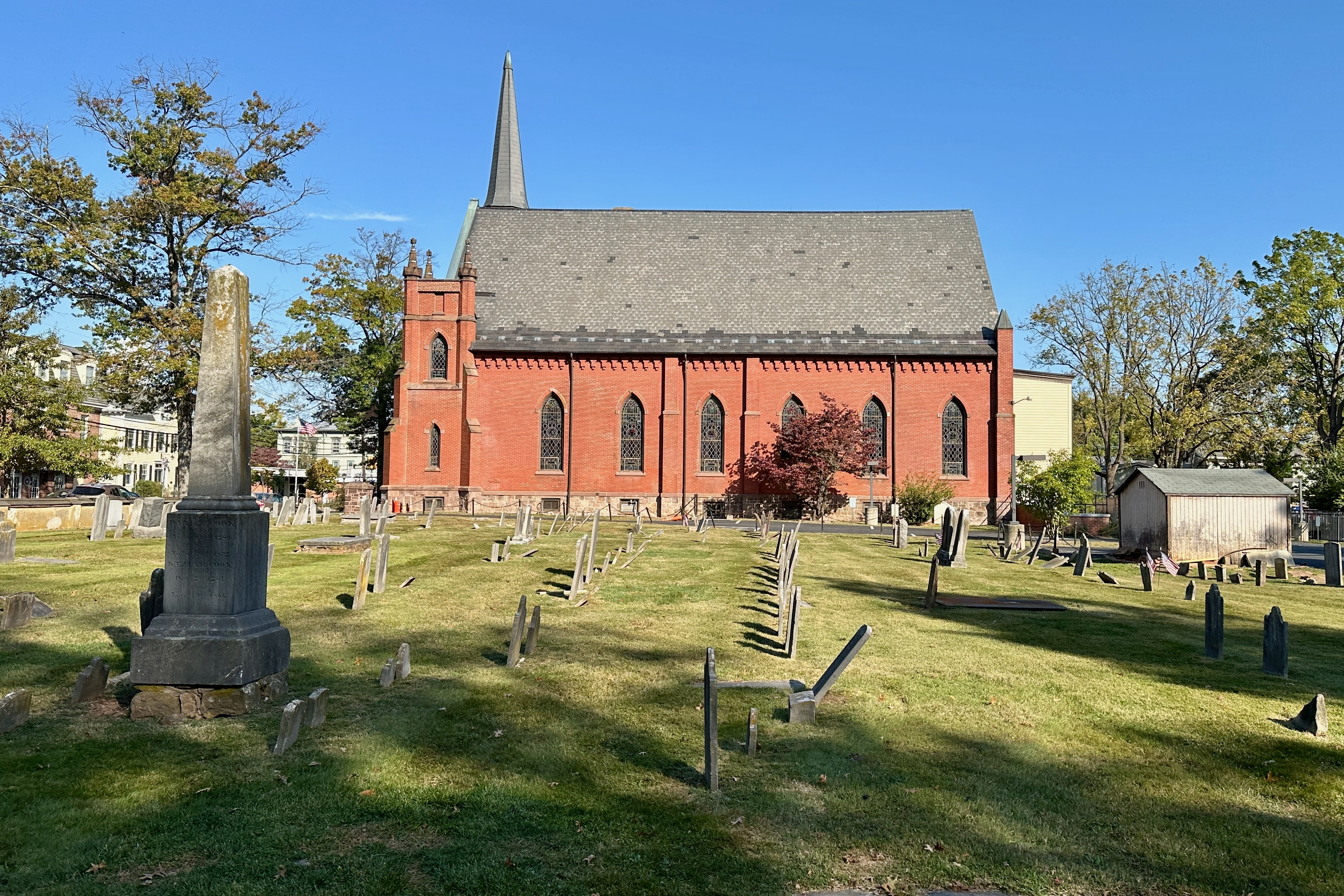
Church and cemetery in 2024

== See also ==
- National Register of Historic Places listings in Mercer County, New Jersey
