= Hopewell station =

Railway station in Hopewell, New Jersey, United States

Hopewell
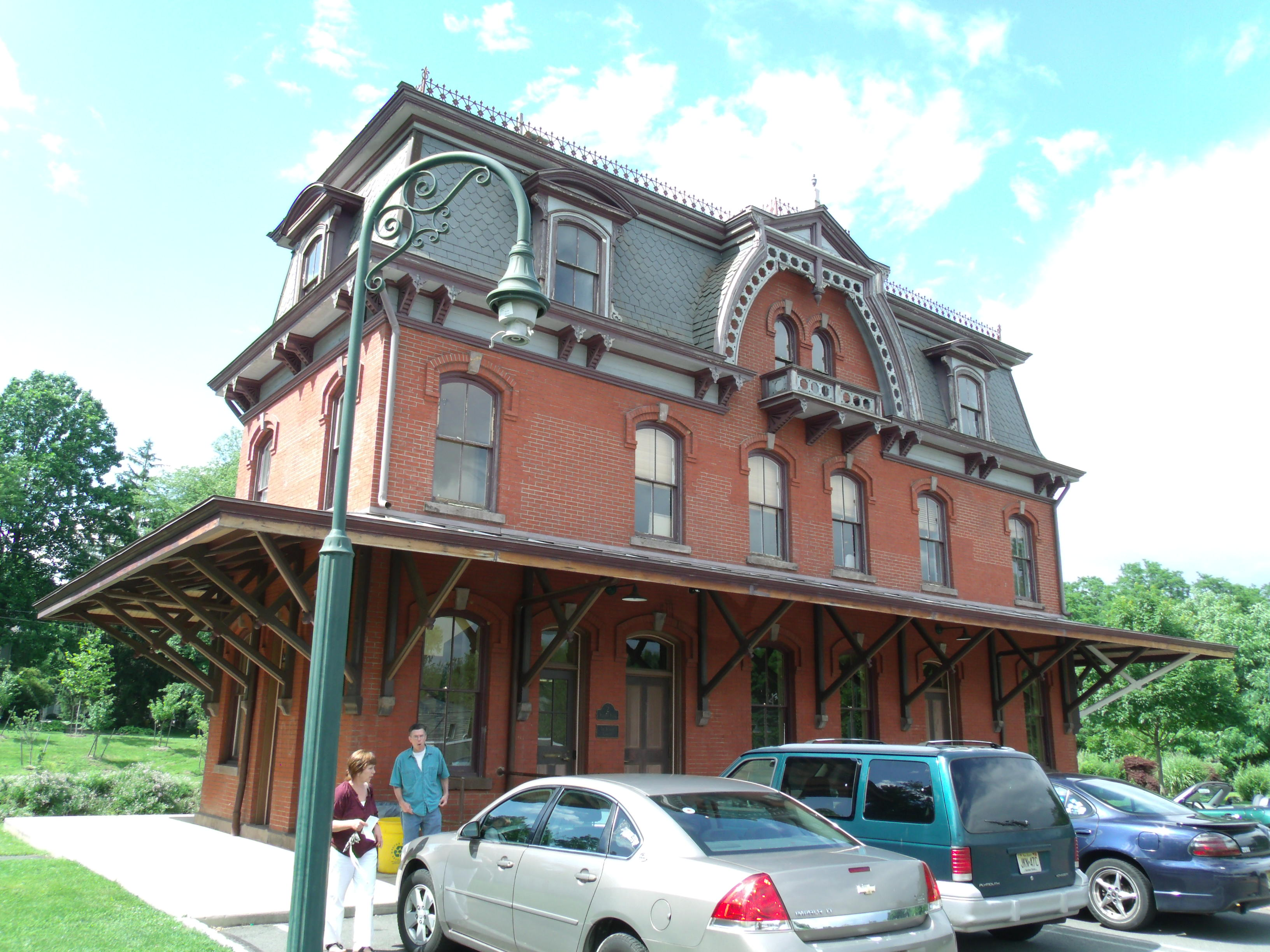
- Hopewell station in 2013.

General information
- Location: 2 Railroad Place, Hopewell, New Jersey

History
- Opened: April 27, 1876 (ceremonial service); May 1, 1876 (regular service)
- Closed: December 3, 1982

Key dates
- October 1976: Station agent eliminated

Former services
Preceding station	Conrail	Following station
West Trenton toward Reading Terminal	Crusader and Wall Street 1976–1981	Belle Mead toward Newark
West Trenton Terminus	West Trenton Line 1981–1982 (NJ Transit)	Belle Mead toward Newark
Preceding station	Reading Railroad	Following station
Glen Moore toward Philadelphia	New York Branch	Stoutsburg toward Bound Brook
- Hopewell Station
- U.S. National Register of Historic Places
- New Jersey Register of Historic Places
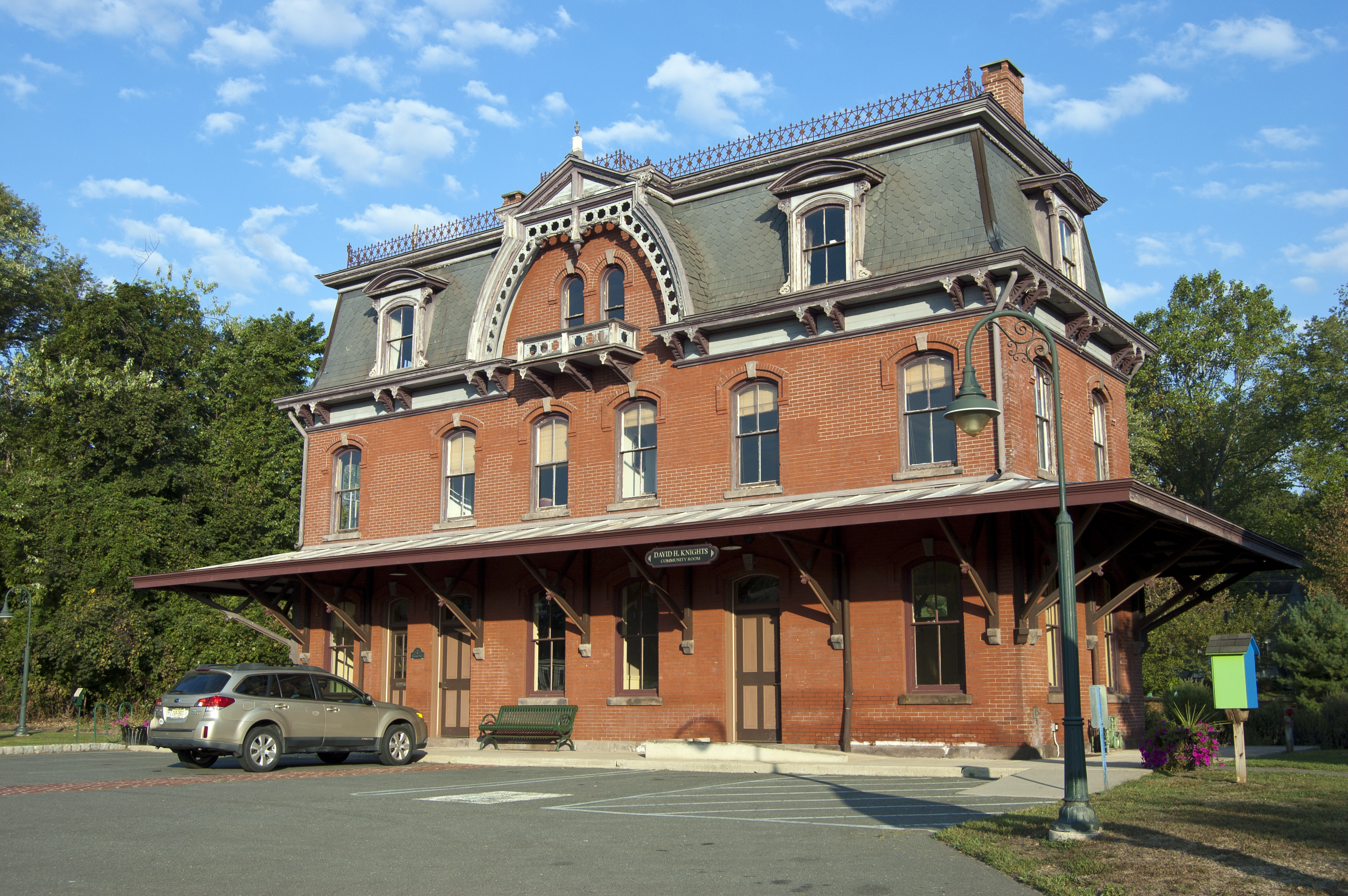
- Hopewell station in 2019
- Interactive map of Hopewell Station
- Location: Railroad Place, Hopewell, New Jersey
- Coordinates: 40.39167°N 74.76266°W
- Area: 0.3 acres (0.12 ha)
- Built: 1876
- Architectural style: Second Empire
- MPS: Operating Passenger Railroad Stations TR
- NRHP reference No.: 84002728
- NJRHP No.: 1673

Significant dates
- Added to NRHP: June 22, 1984
- Designated NJRHP: March 17, 1984
Location

Hopewell is a defunct commuter railroad station in the eponymous borough of Hopewell, Mercer County, New Jersey. Located on Railroad Place east of North Greenwood Avenue, the station served trains of Conrail's West Trenton Line between Newark Penn Station and West Trenton, New Jersey. Hopewell station serviced trains of the Reading Railroad, including the Crusader and Wall Street. The station had two low-level side platforms. The 1876-built railroad depot, which is on the state and national registers of Historic Places, stands on Railroad Place, overlooking the single track. The former passenger line currently serves freight trains as part of CSX Transportation's Trenton Subdivision.

Hopewell station opened on May 1, 1876 as part of the introduction of regular passenger service on the Delaware and Bound Brook Railroad. The station agent was eliminated in October 1976 as part of operational cuts by Conrail. Passenger service ended in its entirety on December 3, 1982. The railroad depot was added to the Historic Places registers in 1984 as part of the Operating Passenger Railroad Stations Thematic Resource. NJ Transit has proposed operating new railroad service between West Trenton and Newark Penn Station as part of a new West Trenton Line. This would include a new platform and station at Hopewell.

== History ==
The Delaware and Bound Brook Railroad built the station in 1876 as part of the planned National Railway route between New York City and Washington, D.C. The station was leased by the Philadelphia and Reading Railway in 1879. Train service to the station was terminated in 1982.

== Gallery ==
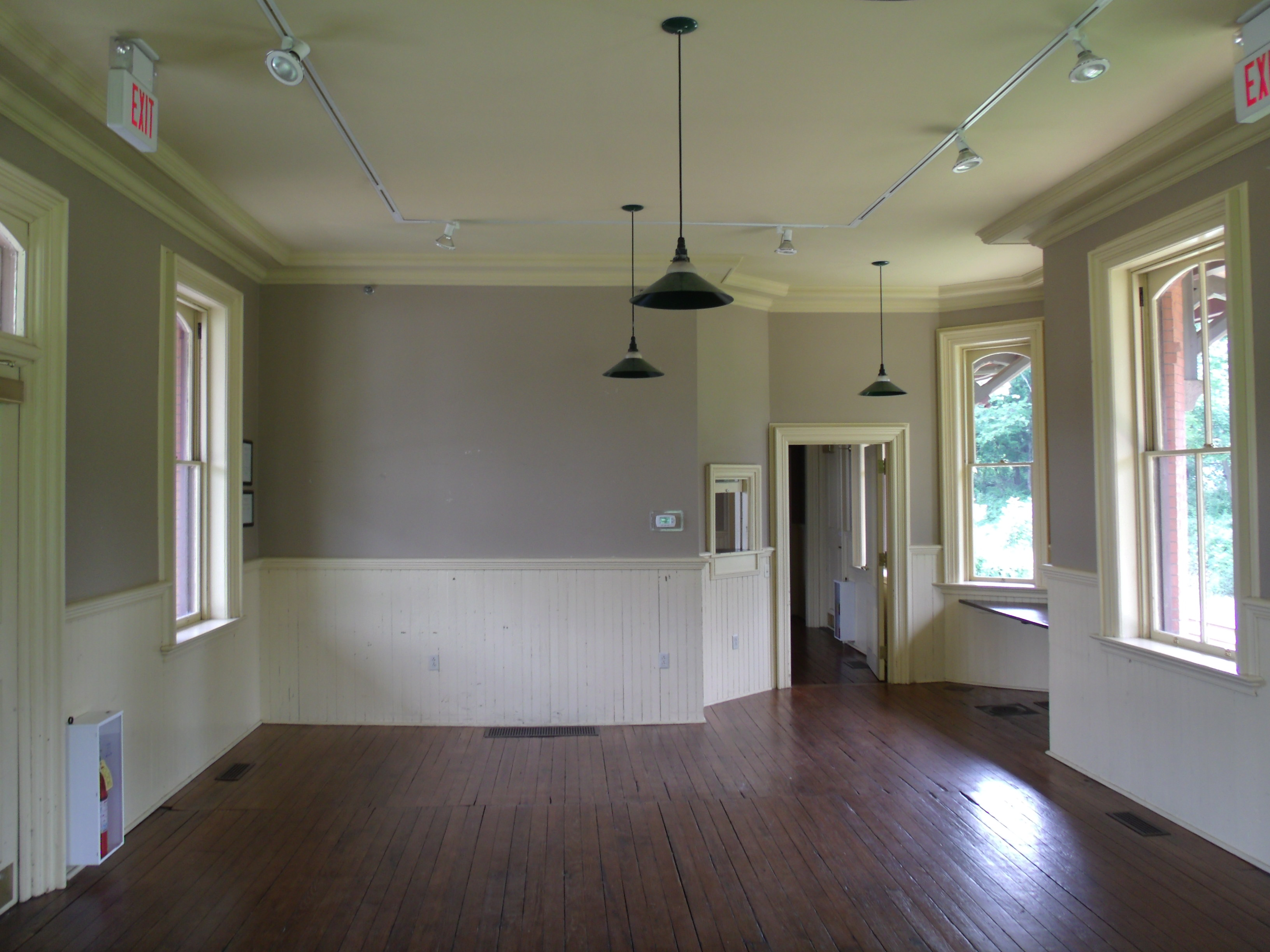
The main room of the Hopewell passenger station, at least part of which may have been the railroad office at one time.

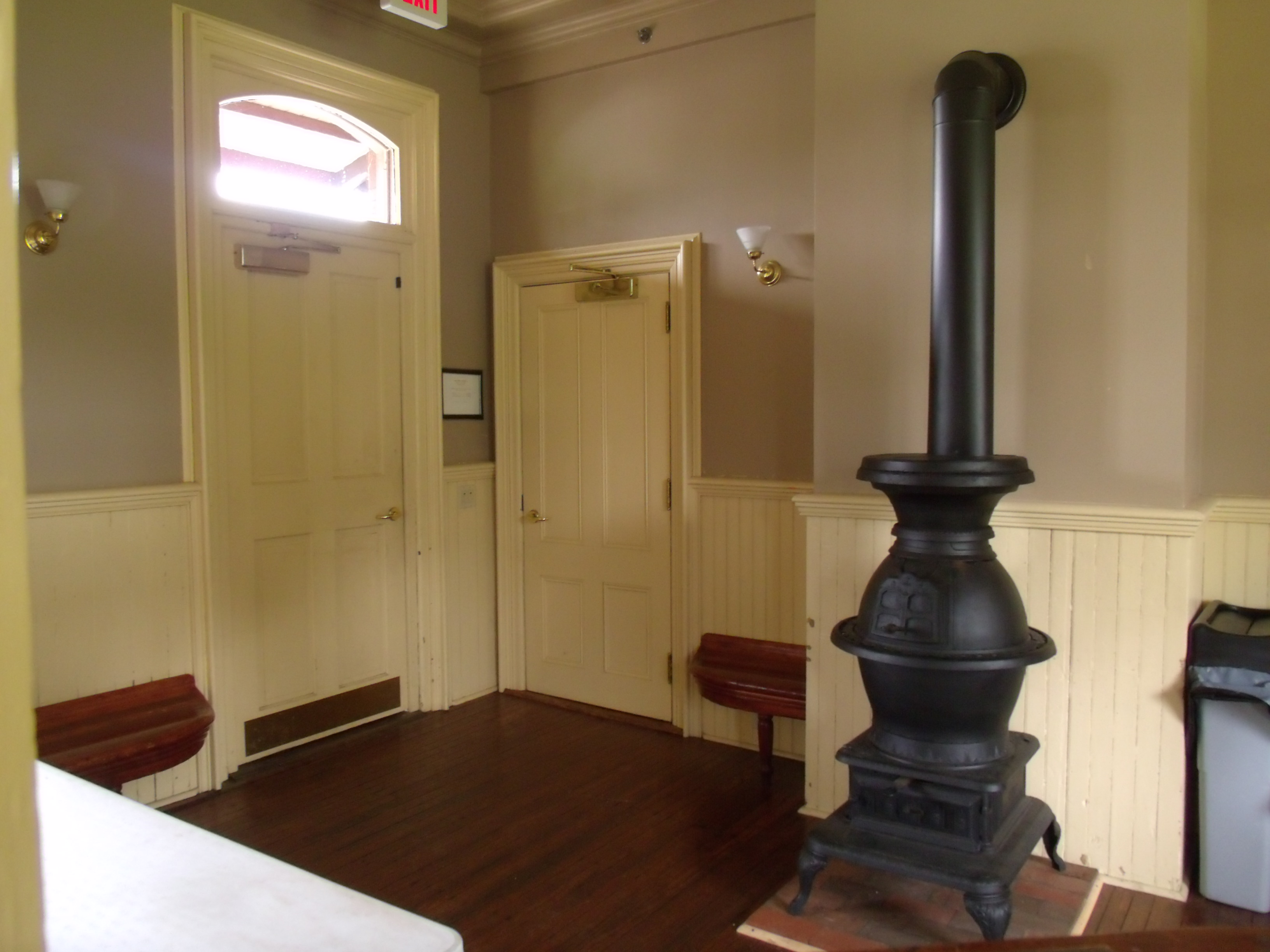
The waiting room of the Hopewell passenger station, complete with vintage stove.

== See also ==
- National Register of Historic Places listings in Mercer County, New Jersey
- List of New Jersey Transit stations

== Bibliography ==
- Poor, Henry Varnum (1865). Manual of the Railroads of the United States: Volume 27. H.V. & H.W. Poor.
