= Trenton Line (disambiguation) =

The Trenton Line is a SEPTA commuter rail line between Trenton, New Jersey and Philadelphia.

Trenton Line may also refer to:

- Trenton Subdivision (CSX Transportation), a rail line in Pennsylvania and New Jersey owned by CSX Transportation (SEPTA West Trenton Line)

== See also ==
- West Trenton Line (disambiguation)
