= Marcel Niederer =

Swiss entrepreneur and ice hockey player

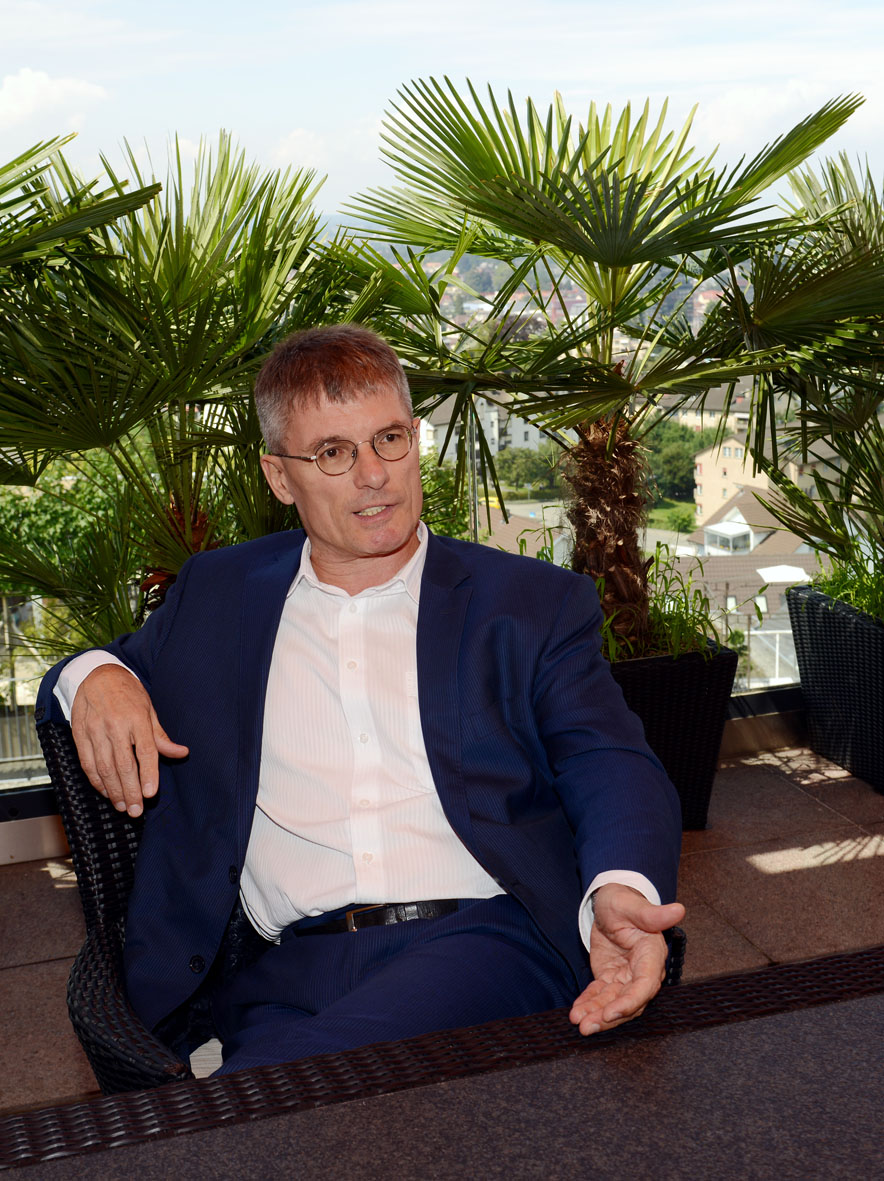
Marcel Niederer - Entrepreneur and Ice Hockey Player

Marcel Niederer (born 9 September 1960 in St. Gallen) is a Swiss entrepreneur and former ice hockey player. He mainly became famous by his sports career and the investment in Belinda Bencic.

== Life ==
=== Career ===
He is a host couple's son who was born in St. Gallen and spent his childhood in Uzwil. Soon he started helping out his parents in their hotel/restaurant. At the age of eight, Marcel Niederer joined the junior-teams of the Ice-Hockey-Team in Uzwil. At the age of 17, he made his debut in the first team of the EHC Uzwil, which then was playing in the National League B. Two years later he made the final leap into the Top Swiss Hockey League (National League A) team of Lausanne HC. Altogether, Marcel Niederer has been playing seven years in the National League A (Lausanne HC, ZSC Lions and EHC Biel). He became Swiss Champion twice (1981 and 1983 with EHC Biel). Marcel Niederer let his career fade away in the National League B and 1st League with EHC Uzwil.

In parallel with his sports career, Marcel Niederer received a commercial apprenticeship as a trustee and afterwards, he finished his studies in marketing and public administration at the university of applied sciences in Olten.

=== Entrepreneur ===
After his studies and his sports career, Marcel Niederer founded a trust company, which offered fiduciary services. Additionally, he was buying old buildings in order to renovate them. Since 1991, Marcel Niederer displaced his activities to Eastern Germany and Russia. A number of years following, Marcel Niederer was selling bananas and mandarins in Eastern Germany and subsequently instant coffee (Nescafé) and fashion (leather goods and clothing from MCM Modern Creation Munich) in Russia. Until 2021 Marcel Niederer was doing business in Russia. Since 2003 Marcel Niederer invested in Belinda Bencic's tennis career. He was also her manager. Since 2006, Marcel Niederer operates in building new apartment blocks in Eastern Switzerland. 2020 Marcel Niederer bought the land of the former Posthotel in Arosa and built the new suites hotel Postresidenz am See. The hotel is planned to open in November 2023.

Niederer is married with three daughters. His youngest child, Christina Niederer, is a former figure skater and dancer. After finishing her bachelor and master studies at the University of St. Gallen (HSG), Christina Niederer worked for several years in banking before joining the family business in the real estate and hospitality industry. Marcel Niederer lives with his family in Switzerland.
