= Christina Niederer =

Swiss figure skater and dancer

Christina Viktoria Niederer
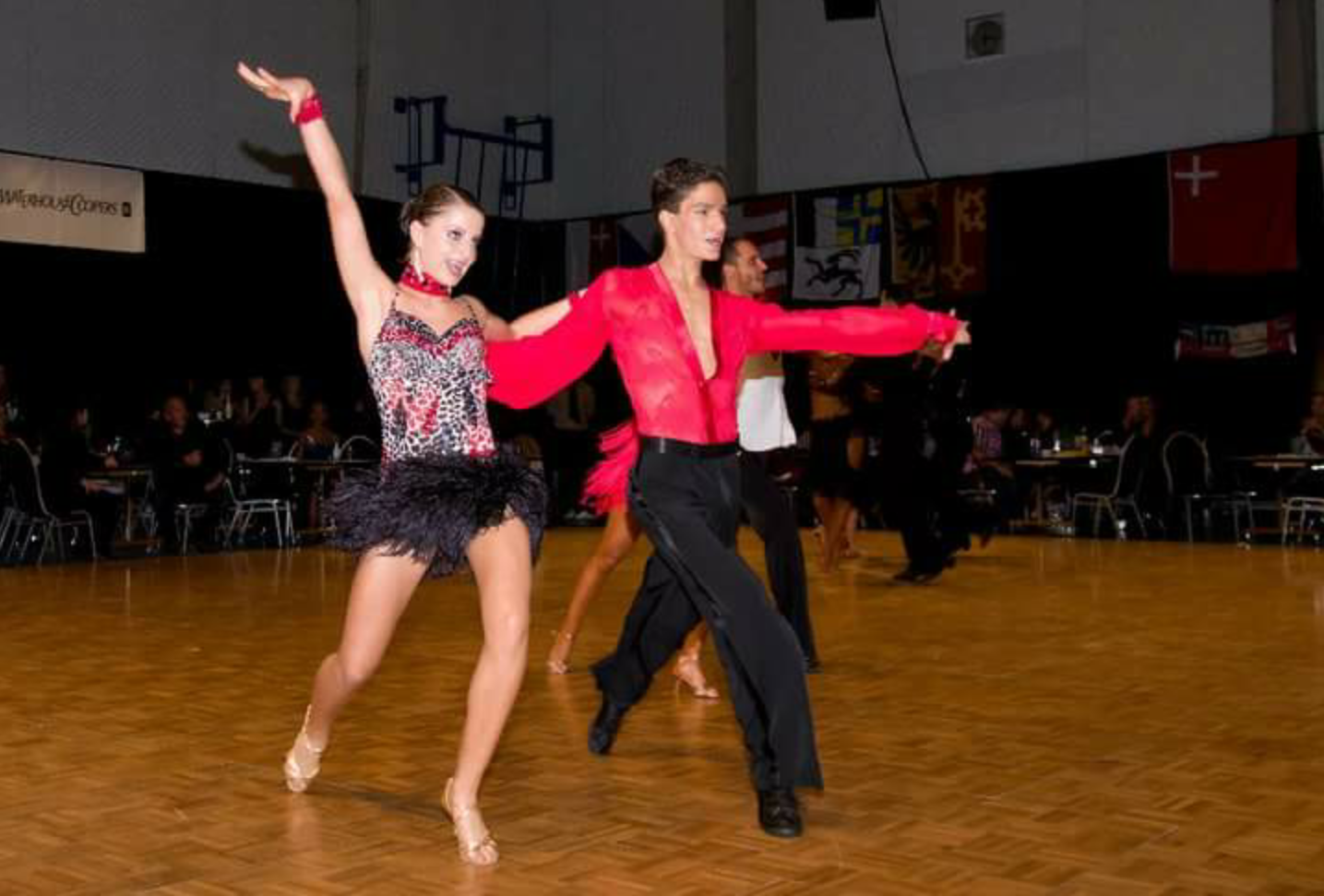

Personal information
- Native name: Кристина Виктория Нидерер (Russian)
- Other names: Christina Viktoria Niederer
- Born: September 15, 1996 (age 29) St. Gallen
- Height: 170 cm (5 ft 7 in)

Figure skating career
- Country: Switzerland
- Partner: David Buechel
- Coach: Martinas Kura, Daniel Steinmann
- Retired: October, 2010
Medal record
Swiss National Championships
Dancesport – Latin Dance and Ballroom Dancing
Representing Switzerland
Swiss National Championship
Gold medal – first place	2007	Ballroom Dancing
Gold medal – first place	2007	Latin Dance
Gold medal – first place	2008	Ballroom Dancing
Silver medal – second place	2008	Latin Dance
Bronze medal – third place	2009	Ten Dances
Silver medal – second place	2010	Ten Dances

Christina Viktoria Niederer (born 15 September 1996 in St. Gallen) is a former Swiss figure skater and dancer with Russian roots. She is the 2007 and 2008 Swiss Junior Champion, the Bronze Medallist of 2009 and the Vice Swiss Champion of 2010 in Latin Dance and Ballroom Dancing. Christina Niederer was a member of the Swiss Olympic Team in Figure Skating. Furthermore, she has the Russian citizenship. After her sports career, Christina Niederer studied business administration in her bachelor's degree and business innovation in her master's degree and graduated from the University of St. Gallen (HSG). After having worked for several years in private banking in Zurich, Christina Niederer joined the family business in the real estate and hospitality industry (Postresidenz am See in Arosa) in the 2022.

== Career ==
=== Family ===
Niederer is Marcel Niederer's daughter, who played ice hockey. Her mother is a native-born Russian. Niederer has two sisters lives with her family near St. Gallen, Switzerland.

=== Dancesport and Figure Skating ===
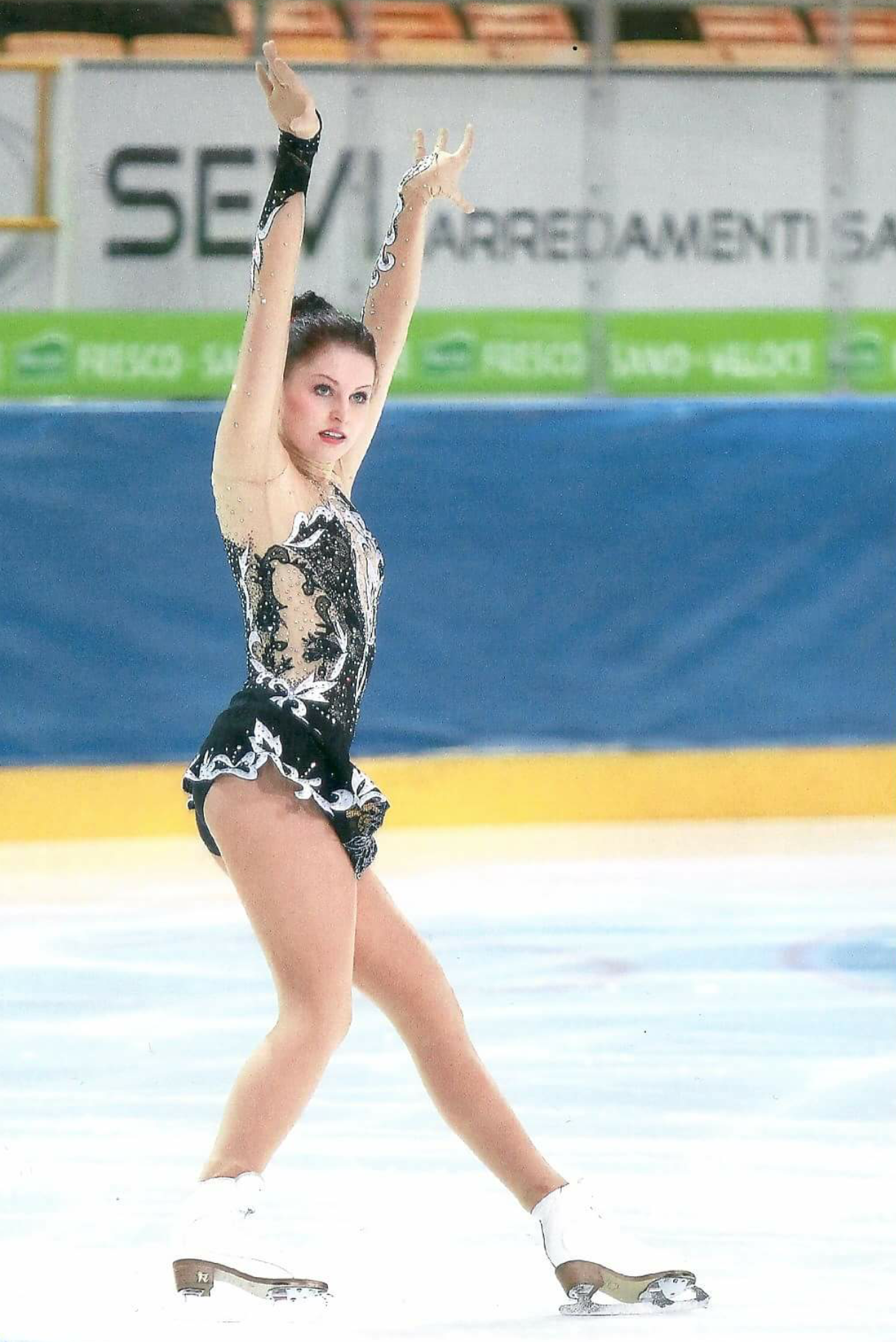
Christina Niederer Short Program

Niederer started her dancing career at the age of 7. Simultaneously, Christina Niederer made a start on figure skating. At the age of 9, Christina Niederer started practicing professionally. Her first coaches were Daniel Steinmann and Martinas Kura in Latin Dance / Ballroom Dancing and Claudia Aebischer in Figure Skating. At the age of 11, Niederer has already won her first Latin Dance and Ballroom Dancing Swiss Champion titles in Juniors with her dancing partner, David Buechel. 2008 they defended their two titles. At the same time, Christina Niederer participated in the Swiss Championships in Figure Skating. Shortly after Niederer won the silver medal at the Swiss Championship of 2010 in Latin Dance and Ballroom Dancing, she decided to stop her dancing career and focus on figure skating. Aged 15, Christina Niederer switched to Elena Romanova and trained at summertime with the famous Russian figure skating coach, Viktor Kudriavtsev. At the age of only 15 years, Christina Niederer passed the highest possible test to reach (Gold Test) thus qualified for the Swiss National Championships. She passed through all the categories and took part in every Swiss National Championship from 2009 to 2015. 2014, Christina Niederer changed her environment and switched to the Figure Skating Club of Zurich (Eissportclub Zuerich-Oerlikon) and trained with Gheorghe Chiper. Due to a hip injury, Christina Niederer decided to change her discipline to Ice Dancing. With her former Ukrainian partner, Niederer moved in spring 2015 to Moscow in order to train with the former partner of Anna Semenovich, Denis Samokhin, and aspire to an internationally successful season. In August 2015, Christina Niederer fell hard while a difficult lift and suffered a concussion. As a consequence of her injury, she decided to stop her athletic career and began studies. Christina Niederer holds two degrees from the University of St. Gallen (HSG) (Bachelor of Arts in Business Administration and Master of Arts in Business Innovation). After having worked for several years in private banking in Zurich, Christina Niederer joined the family business in the real estate and hospitality industry (Postresidenz am See in Arosa) in the 2022.

== Results ==
Championships	2006	2007	2008	2009	2010	2011	2012	2013	2014	2015
Swiss National Championship (Dancing) (Ballroom Dancing, Latin Dance und Ten Dances)	2.S Ballroom 3.S Latin	1.J Ballroom 1.J Latin	1.J Ballroom 2.J.Latin	3. Ten Dances	2. Ten Dances	-	-	-	-	-
VM Figure Skating	7.	2.	2.	-	1.	1.	1.	1.	-	-
Championship of Zurich in Figure Skating	-	-	-	-	-	-	-	-	1.	-
Eastern Swiss National Championship in Figure Skating	-	-	-	-	3.N	1.N	1.N	2.J	1.	-
Trophée Romand, Compétition Internationale, Figure Skating	-	-	-	-	-	-	3.J	-	2.	-
Swiss National Championships in Figure Skating	-	-	-	24.M	11.J	10.N*	5.N	-	10.J	14.
Swiss Cup Zurich in Figure Skating	1.S	-	9.M	5.N	-	-	-	3.J	1.	-
European Criterium in Figure Skating	-	-	-	-	-	2.N	2.J		-	-
Swiss Cup Chur in Figure Skating	-	-	-	3.N	1.N	3.N	2.J	-	-	-
Alpenpokal in Figure Skating	-	-	-	-	-	-	-	6.J.	4.	-

S = Schüler, N = Nachwuchs, J = Junioren *only short program skated
