= Sue Niederer =

American political activist

Sue Sapir-Niederer is an American political activist.

Niederer's son was Second Lieutenant Seth Dvorin, a 24-year-old U.S. Army soldier in the 10th Mountain Division who was killed on February 3, 2004, during the occupation of Iraq. Dvorin, who had just returned to Iraq after spending two weeks with his family, was killed after locating an improvised explosive device. After Dvorin's death, Niederer campaigned against the re-election of George W. Bush and continued American military presence in Iraq. Niederer came to national prominence after she was arrested for disrupting a speech by First Lady Laura Bush in September 2004. Later criminal charges of "defiant trespass" against Niederer were dropped.

Niederer lives in Pennington, New Jersey. She entered a Bush-Cheney rally of about 700 at a firehouse in Hamilton Township on September 16, 2004. Niederer had a ticket to the rally, as required, and carried a T-shirt in her purse which read "President Bush You Killed My Son," with a picture of her son. During Bush's speech, Niederer shouted "Why did my son have to die?" and "When are yours going to serve?" (a reference to Bush's children).

Bush supporters began a loud chant of "Four more years," quickly drowning Niederer out. Reports indicated that such a response to disruption was planned; one campaign volunteers was quoted as saying, "If anybody acts up, I just start chanting, 'Four more years!'" Some Bush supporters directly confronted Niederer, including one audience member who yelled, "Your son chose to fight in that war."

Niederer was forcibly removed by local police and Secret Service, who handcuffed her and placed her in the back of a police van. Even though videotape of the incident appears to show Niederer resisting arrest, she was never criminally charged with resisting arrest.

Mercer County Prosecutor Joseph L. Bocchini Jr. issued a statement defending the police for stopping Niederer from heckling the First Lady, but some free speech advocates felt the charge was unwarranted.

"It is our determination that the police officers had more than enough probable cause to arrest Ms. Sapir-Niederer and were justified in their actions," said Bocchini. "Taking all factors into consideration, including the recent loss of her son while serving in the armed forces in Iraq, I believe that the continued prosecution of the this [sic] matter would serve no useful purpose."
