= Crusader (train) =

Reading Railroad train between Philadelphia and Jersey City

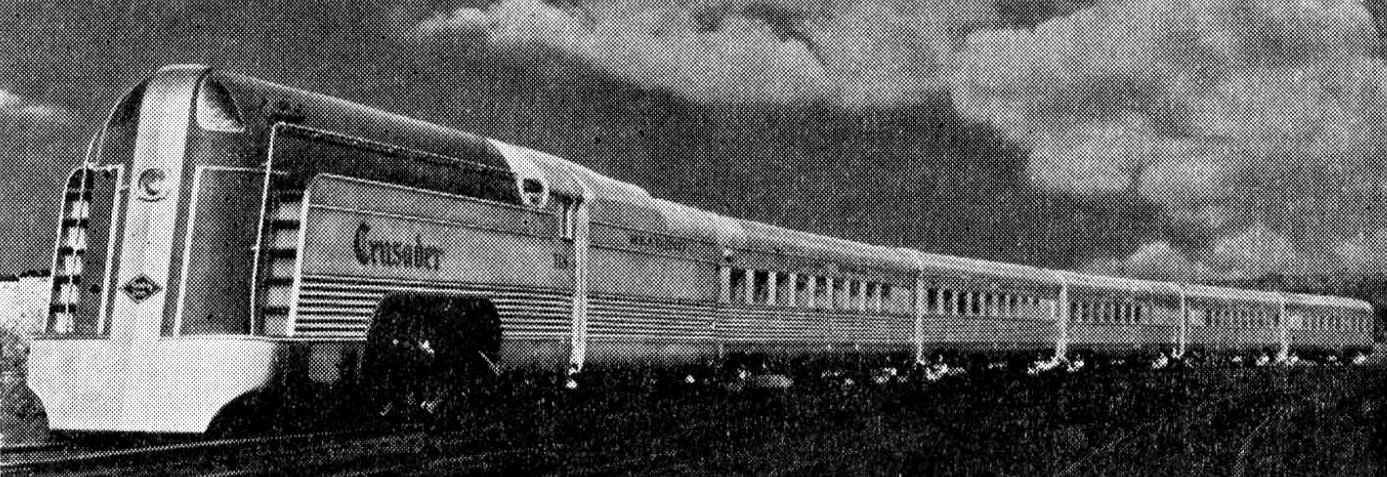
- The 1937-built Crusader trainset

Overview
- Service type: Inter-city rail
- Status: Discontinued (partially replaced by the West Trenton Line)
- Locale: Northeastern United States
- First service: December 13, 1937
- Last service: July 30, 1981
- Former operators: Reading Railroad; Conrail (1976–1981)

Route
- Termini: Reading Terminal; Communipaw Terminal
- Distance travelled: 90.2 miles (145.2 km)
- Average journey time: 1 hr 38 min
- Service frequency: 2 daily round trips (6 days per week)

On-board services
- Seating arrangements: coach
- Catering facilities: dining car with cocktail lounge
- Observation facilities: observation car

The Crusader was a 5 car stainless steel streamlined express train that ran on a 90.3-mile (145.3 km) route from Philadelphia's Reading Terminal to Jersey City's Communipaw Terminal, with a ferry connection to Lower Manhattan at Liberty Street. The Reading Railroad provided this service in partnership with the Central Railroad of New Jersey (CNJ), in which it was the majority owner of capital stock. Trains including the Crusader ran on Reading Railroad tracks from Reading Terminal in Philadelphia to Bound Brook, NJ, where they continued on CNJ tracks to Communipaw Terminal in Jersey City. Passengers then left the train and walked aboard the ferry or boarded buses that loaded onto the ferry. Introduced in 1937, the Crusader service declined during the 1960s, and the name was ultimately dropped in 1981.

== History ==
=== Creation ===
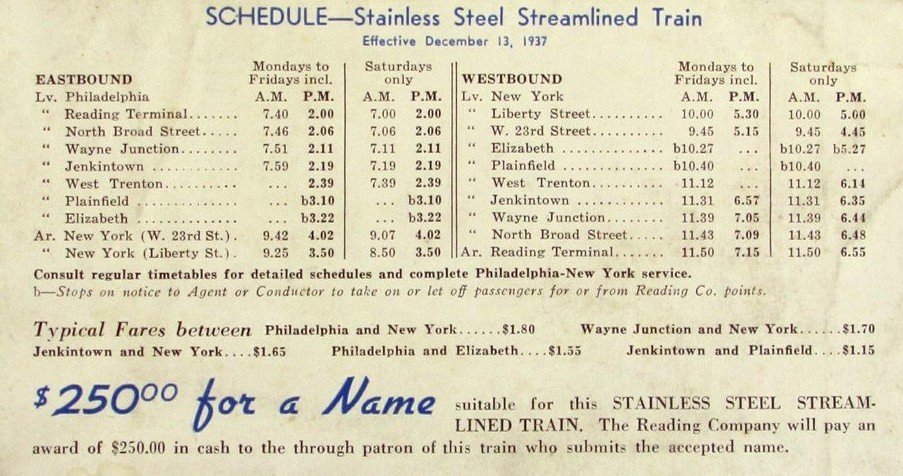
The train's first schedule and the contest to name it.

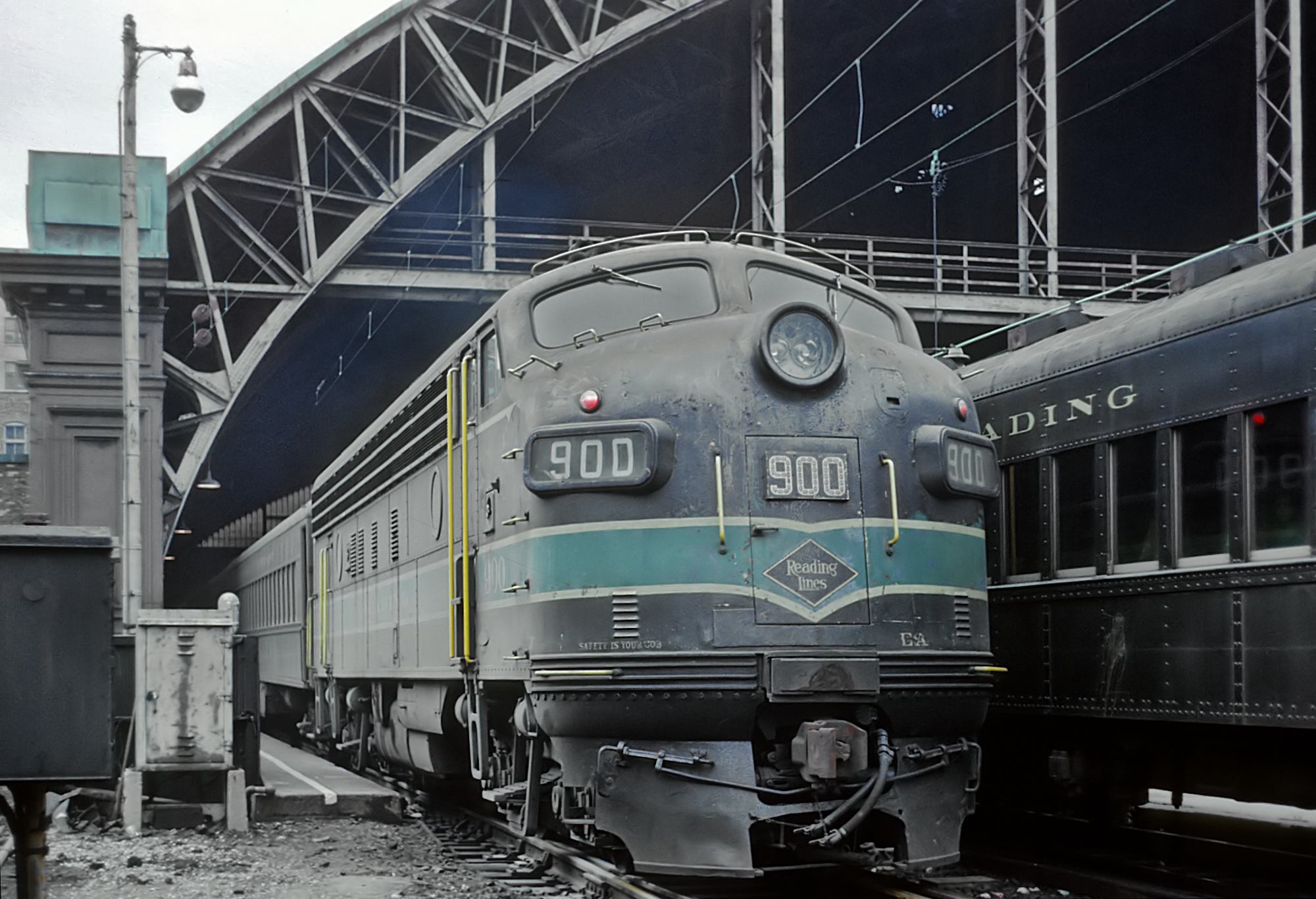
The Crusader at Reading Terminal in 1968, shortly before the train began operating with Rail Diesel Cars

By the 1930s, the Reading Company offered hourly expresses from Reading Terminal to the Central Railroad of New Jersey's Jersey City Communipaw Terminal via the Reading's New York Branch to Bound Brook where it connected with the CNJ. In order to better compete for passenger business from Philadelphia to New York with its rival Pennsylvania Railroad and attract more riders, in 1937 the railroad introduced its new Crusader premier service. Built by the Budd Company of Philadelphia, this dedicated train consisted of five stainless steel streamlined cars pulled by a stainless steel shrouded streamlined Pacific class (4-6-2) steam locomotive. The train consisted of two stainless-steel coaches, two observation cars, and a tavern-dining car. A round-end observation car was at each end, a coach adjacent, and the tavern car in the middle. With this configuration, the railroad eliminated the need to turn the entire train around at the "stub end" terminals at both Jersey City and Philadelphia. Only the locomotive had to be reversed at the completion of each trip. Each locomotive had a specially-built tender (carrying the coal and water for locomotive operation) that wrapped around the observation car directly behind it.

=== Naming ===
A contest was held to find a name for the new train, offering a $250 cash prize (equivalent to $5,468 in 2024) to the winner. The Crusader, the entry of Mr. P. W. Silzer of Plainfield, New Jersey, won the prize, selected by a committee of 29 railroad officials from among 6,086 suggestions. The Crusader's first regular run was on December 13, 1937. The train was scheduled to make two round trips six days a week; Sundays were reserved for maintenance work.

=== Decline ===
In the early 1950s, the streamlined steam locomotives were replaced by General Motors EMD FP7 diesel electric locomotives. Passenger business was declining for the Reading as it was for all railroads at the time. For cost saving, in 1962 the stainless steel Crusader trainset was sold to the Canadian National Railway. The Crusader then began operating with the smooth-sided cars originally made for the Reading's other upscale Philadelphia–Jersey City train, the Wall Street. By the mid-1960s, the Crusader and Wall Street were the only Reading Railroad trains operating beyond West Trenton north to Bound Brook.

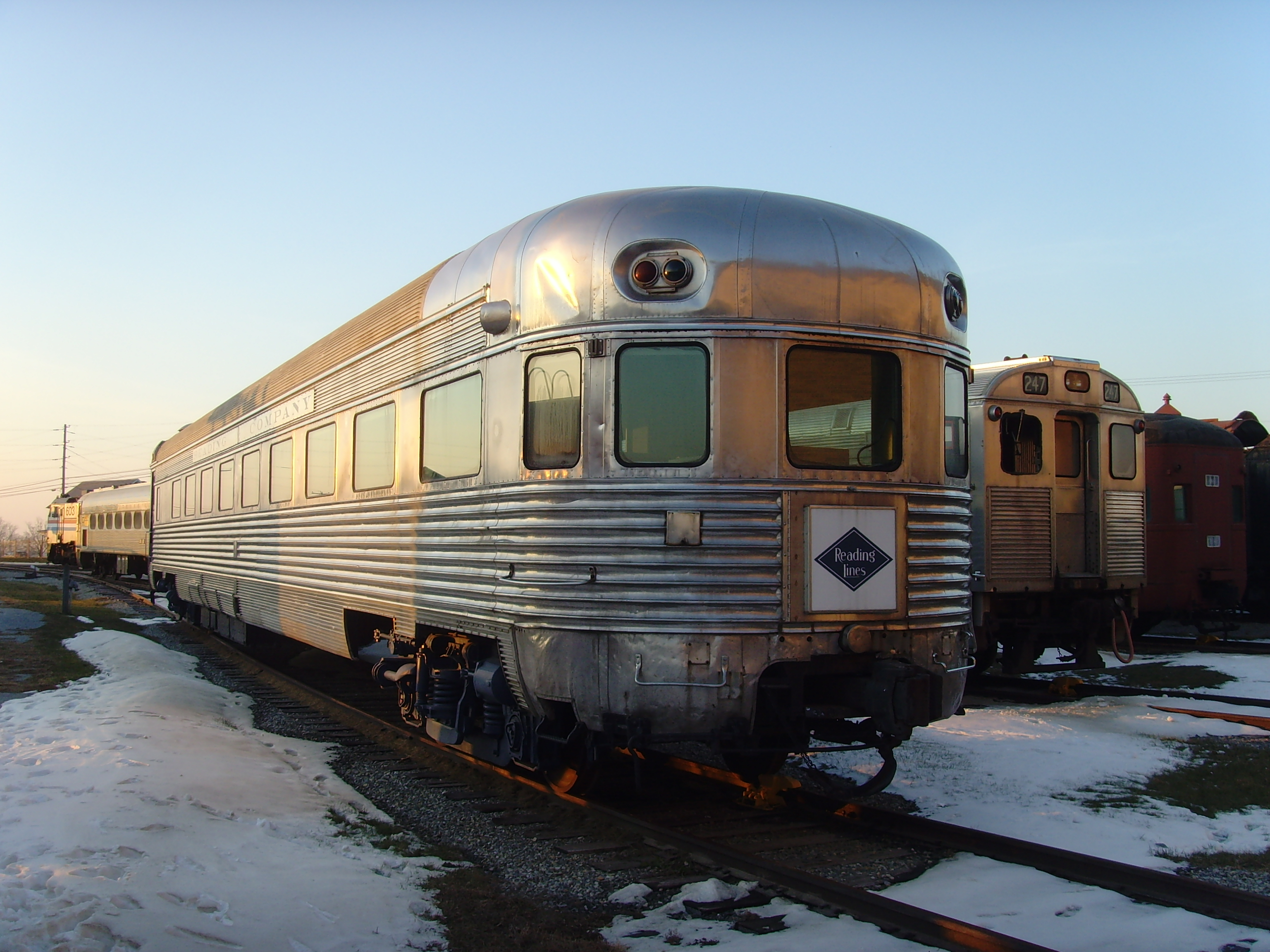
The Crusader observation car at the Railroad Museum of Pennsylvania

In May 1967, the Aldene Plan went into effect; this closed the Jersey City Communipaw Terminal and diverted trains to Newark Penn Station, thus adding 13 minutes to the commuter going to Wall Street. The trains could not go beyond Newark Penn Station to New York Penn Station because diesel-powered trains were not permitted in the Pennsylvania Railroad's Hudson North River Tunnels. Locomotive-hauled service soon ended and was replaced by two self propelled Budd Rail Diesel Cars. Deteriorating track and additional stops to the prior Crusader schedule caused the length of the Philadelphia-Newark trip to increase from its 90 minutes to 110 minutes.

This passenger service, like many former Reading and CNJ lines, was eventually subsidized by SEPTA and New Jersey Transit. In the early 1980s, SEPTA began cutting back its diesel-powered lines in preparation for the opening of the electric-only Philadelphia Center City Commuter Connection that tied together the former Reading Terminal and the Pennsylvania Railroads Suburban Station tracks. Through service from Philadelphia to Newark ended on July 30, 1981; SEPTA continued hourly commuter trains on its electric West Trenton Line, with a connection to a once-daily, weekday-only diesel powered West Trenton to Newark shuttle. This service ended on December 3, 1982, when the NJ Transit shuttle made its final trip due to poor ridership and a budget deficit. The trip served 290 daily passengers and cost $319,000 annually to run. NJT has explored restoring the service as its own West Trenton Line.

Two of the train's original five cars survive. An observation car is in the collection of the Railroad Museum of Pennsylvania at Strasburg, Pennsylvania. The other observation car was in service as part of the Spirit of Washington Dinner Train in Washington state until 2007, and is now part of the passenger car fleet of Iowa Pacific Holdings.
