= Frank Baldwin (admiral) =

American naval officer (1880–1959)

- Born: November 19, 1880; Pennington, New Jersey, US
- Died: October 19, 1959 (aged 78)
- Burial place: Arlington National Cemetery
- Military career
- Allegiance: United States
- Branch: United States Navy
- Service years: 1906–1950
- Rank: Rear Admiral
- Unit: U.S. Naval Railway Batteries
- Commands: Naval Cost Inspection Service
- Wars: World War I World War II

Frank Baldwin (November 19, 1880 – October 19, 1959) was an American naval officer from Pennington, New Jersey.

== Military career ==
Baldwin was commissioned into the Supply Corps in 1906. During the First World War, Baldwin served with the U.S. Navy's railway batteries, with which he saw service in the Aisne-Marne and Meuse-Argonne offensives. During the Meuse-Argonne offensive, all but one of the U.S. Navy's railway batteries was dedicated to bombarding German communication lines.

In 1937, Baldwin graduated from the Naval War College, and in August 1941 he went on to command the Naval Cost Inspection Service. In 1942, Baldwin was promoted to rear admiral, before retiring in 1944. He was immediately recalled to active duty as director of the Cost Inspection Service, a position he would hold until 1950, when he retired once more.

== Civilian life ==
During his retirement, Baldwin was heavily involved in the Navy Mutual Aid Association (NMAA), where he filled the role of chairman of the finance committee multiple times and that of second vice-president for the association in 1955.

Frank Baldwin died on 19 October 1959, aged 78. He is buried at Arlington National Cemetery.
