= West Trenton Line (NJ Transit) =

Proposed NJ Transit rail line

Overview
- Status: Proposed
- Owner: CSX Transportation
- Termini: Newark Penn Station; West Trenton station (SEPTA)
- Stations: 8

Service
- Type: Commuter
- System: CSX Trenton Subdivision
- Operator(s): New Jersey Transit

History
- Proposed: 2007

The West Trenton Line is a proposed NJ Transit (NJT) commuter rail service that would be operated mostly on the CSX Transportation Trenton Subdivision, connecting West Trenton Station in Ewing Township, New Jersey with Newark Penn Station in Newark, New Jersey. The route would connect with the Raritan Valley Line at Bridgewater and the SEPTA West Trenton Line at West Trenton. As of 2007, NJT's estimate of the cost of creating a passenger line to West Trenton was $219 million. The project is still on the books, but no funding for the proposal has been secured to this date.

== Former service ==
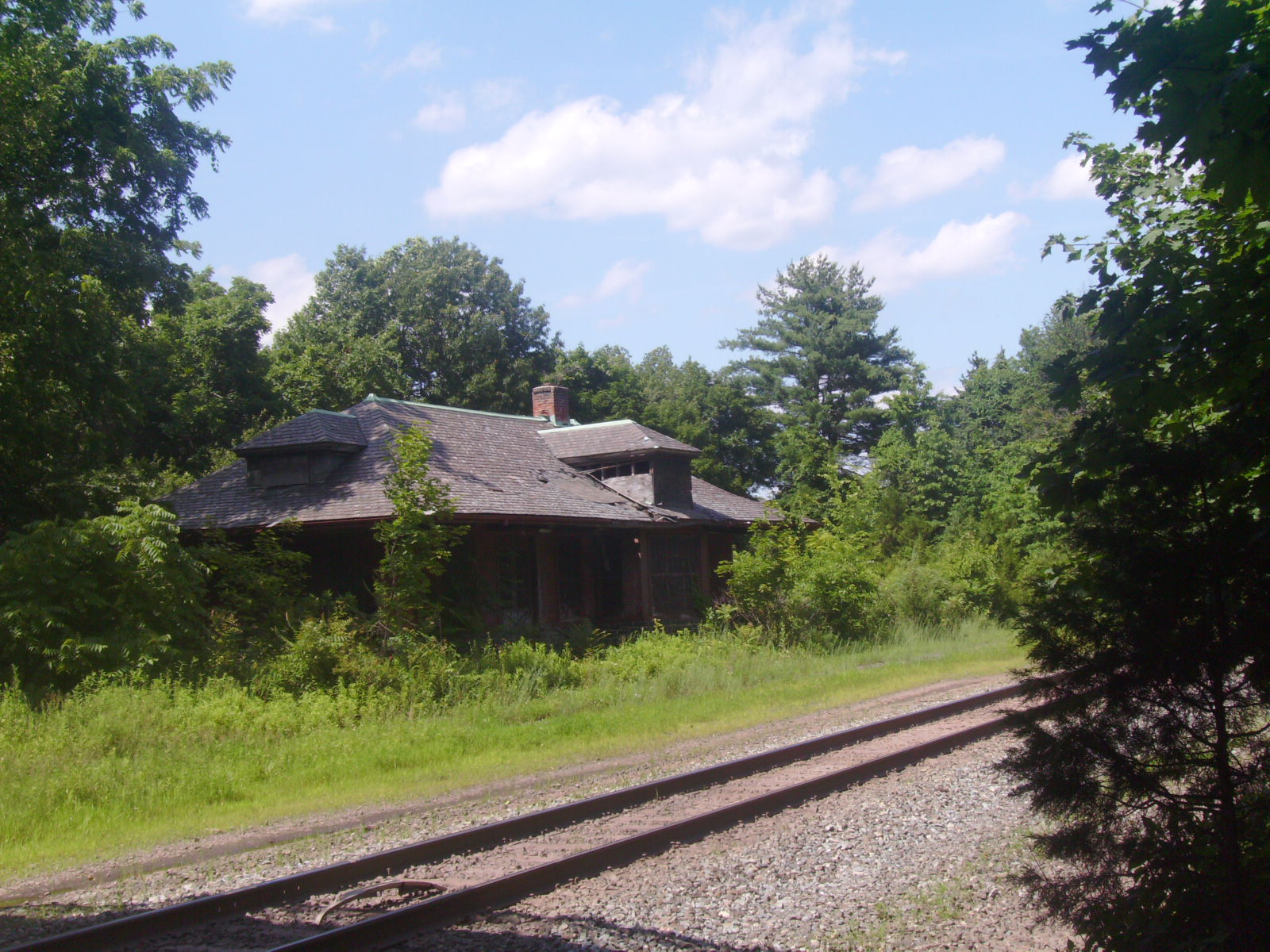
The Reading Company's Belle Mead station, which saw service until 1982

Historically, this was a property of the Reading Company. This line carried the Reading's Crusader and Wall Street trains, which originally operated as through service from Reading Terminal in Philadelphia to Communipaw Terminal in Jersey City (after 1965, to Newark). Until 1958, Baltimore and Ohio Railroad long distance trains such as the Royal Blue to Washington, D.C., Capitol Limited (B&O train) to Chicago and the National Limited to St. Louis traveled on this line as well.

The Philadelphia-Newark service, like many former Reading and CNJ lines, was eventually subsidized by SEPTA and New Jersey Transit. In the early 1980s, SEPTA began cutting back its diesel-powered lines in preparation for the opening of the electric-only Center City Commuter Connection. Through service from Philadelphia to Newark ended on July 30, 1981; SEPTA continued service on its electric West Trenton Line, with a connection to a once-daily, weekday-only West Trenton-Newark shuttle using Budd Rail Diesel Cars. This service ended on December 3, 1982, consequent to significant reductions in federal funding for mass transit enacted by the Reagan administration in the prior year. The trip served 290 daily passengers and cost $319,000 annually to operate. The three stops discontinued were Belle Mead, Hopewell and West Trenton. New Jersey Transit retained operating rights over the line.

== Proposal ==
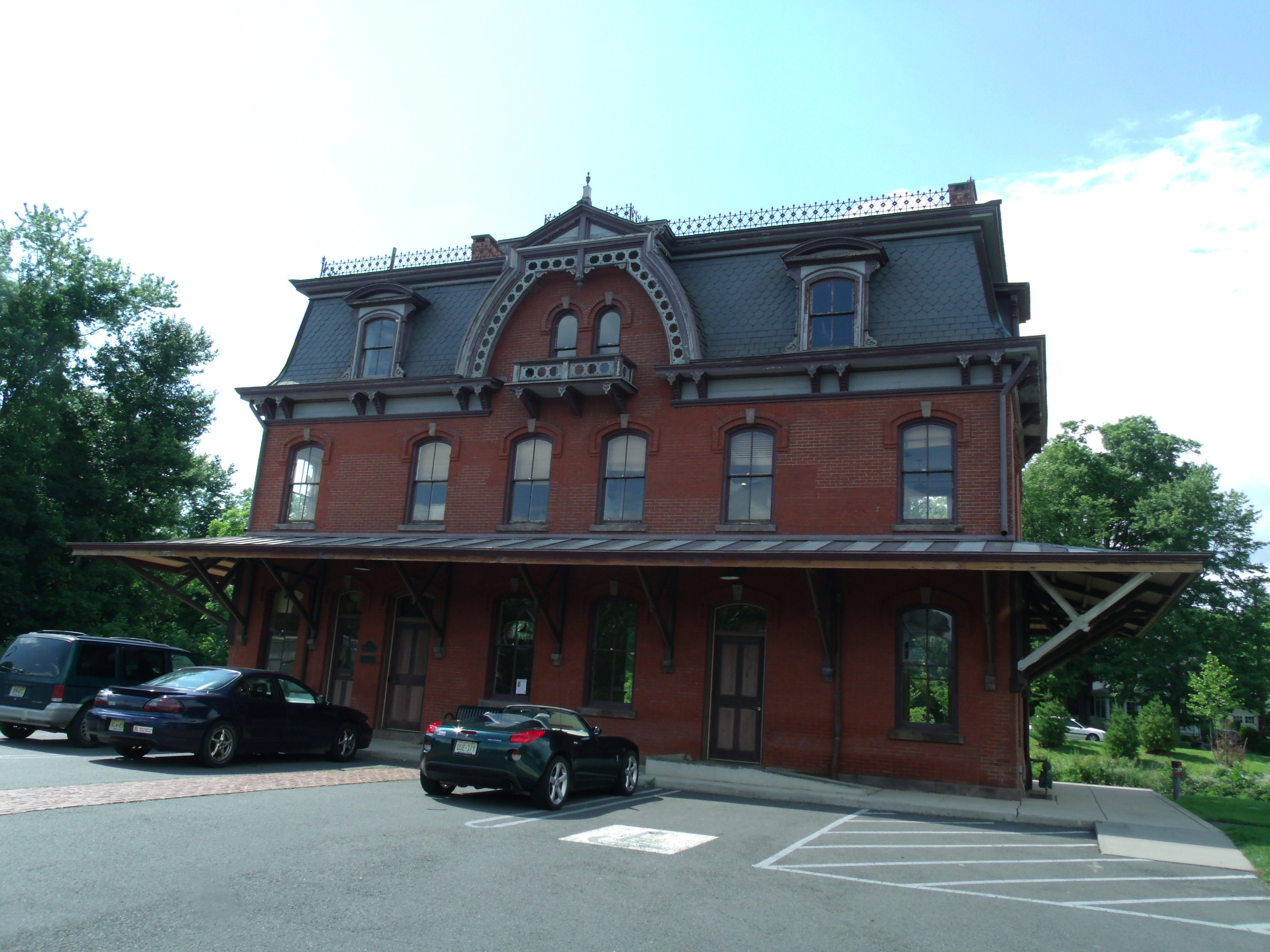
Hopewell station, served until 1981, would be served again under the proposal

Presently, the route is owned by CSX Transportation; all station platforms have been removed except at West Trenton, which is currently used by the West Trenton Line, a SEPTA commuter service to Philadelphia which also operates on the Trenton Subdivision.

Additional track would be added to the existing right-of-way as part of the plan. A second track would be installed between the Sunnymeade Road grade crossing and Port Reading Junction, where the West Trenton Line diverges from the Lehigh Line, for a distance of 2.8 miles. A second track would also be installed between Pennington – Hopewell Road Bridge and the Belle Mead station for a distance of 10 miles. Track would also be restored on the Reading Connector, an abandoned railroad right-of-way that ran between Port Reading Junction and the Raritan Valley Line. According to a 2007 plan, there would be 14 daily trains, five peak trains in each direction, one morning outbound train to West Trenton, one evening inbound train to Newark, and one midday train in each direction. Travel time would be 80 minutes from West Trenton to Newark. There would be an estimated 2,660 daily trips on the restored line. 13.1 acres of land would be acquired for a West Trenton rail yard.

Communities along the rail line, such as Hopewell Township, have supported the planned restoration of the line.

== Proposed new stations ==
- West Trenton (Connection with SEPTA West Trenton Line service)
- I-295 / Hopewell (Township)
- Hopewell (Borough)
- Belle Mead
- Hillsborough

Trains would continue along the Raritan Valley Line from Bridgewater to Newark Penn Station.
