= Philmont station =

Railway station in Huntingdon Valley, Pennsylvania

Philmont
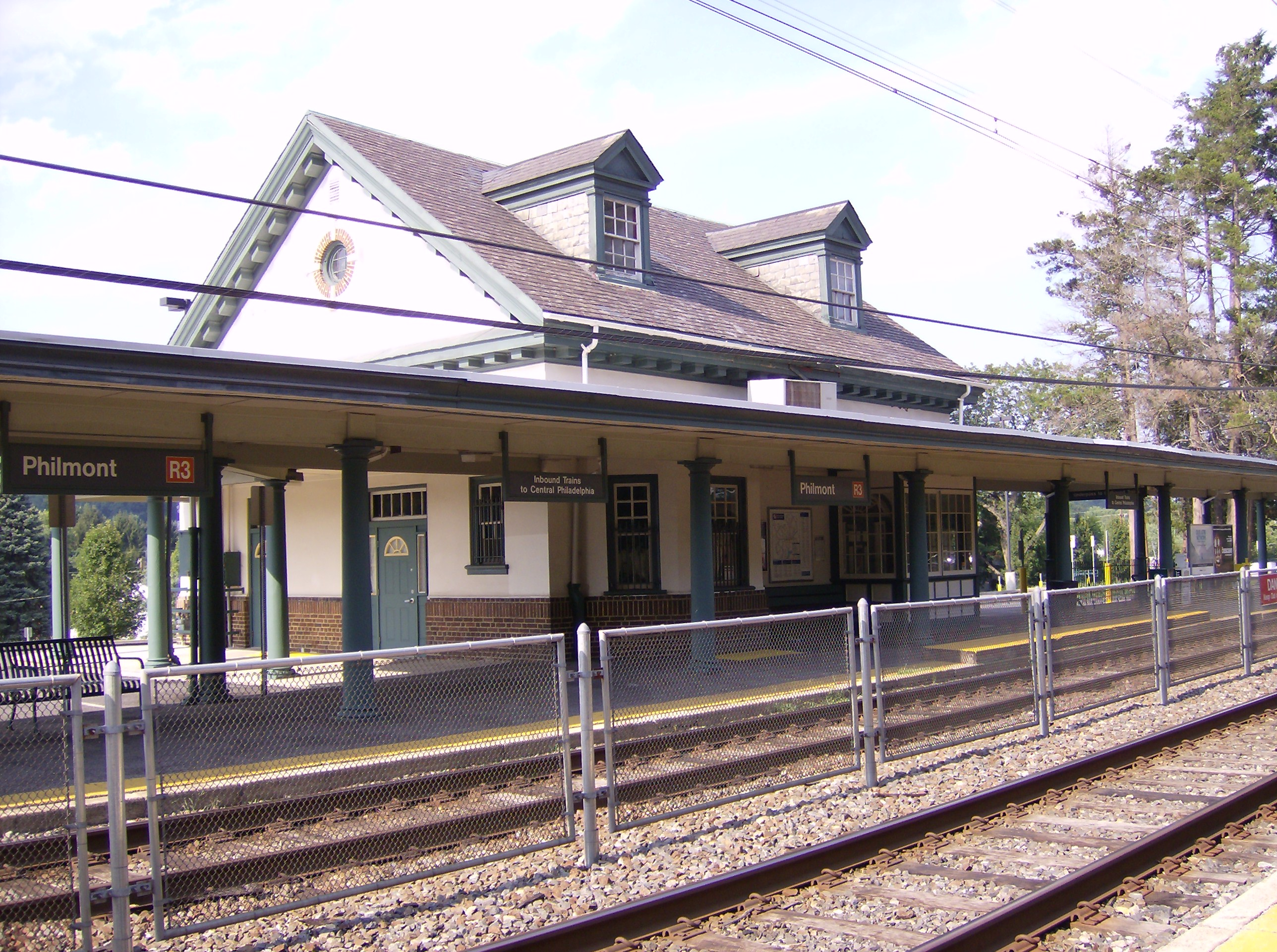
- Philmont station in August 2006

General information
- Location: Tomlinson Road and Philmont Avenue; Huntingdon Valley, Pennsylvania 19006
- Coordinates: 40.1220°N 75.0438°W
- Owner: SEPTA
- Line: Neshaminy Line
- Platforms: 2 side platforms
- Tracks: 2

Construction
- Parking: 250 spaces (164 with permit)
- Accessible: yes

Other information
- Fare zone: 3

History
- Rebuilt: 1913
- Electrified: July 26, 1931

Key dates
- March 17, 1913: Station depot burns

Passengers
- 2017: 595 boardings 614 alightings (weekday average)
- Rank: 39 of 146

Services
Preceding station	SEPTA	Following station
Bethayres toward Penn Medicine Station	West Trenton Line	Forest Hills toward West Trenton
Former services
Preceding station	Reading Railroad	Following station
Bethayres toward Philadelphia	New York Branch	Forest Hills toward Bound Brook
Location

Philmont station is a station along the SEPTA West Trenton Line to Ewing, New Jersey. It is located at Tomlinson Road & Philmont Avenue in Lower Moreland Township, Pennsylvania. In FY 2013, Philmont station had a weekday average of 633 boardings and 574 alightings. The station has off-street parking and a ticket office. Philmont station was built in 1913 by the Reading Railroad after the previous depot caught fire on March 17 of that year.

== Station layout ==
Philmont has two low-level side platforms with a mini high-level platform.
