= Bryn Athyn-Lower Moreland Bridge =

- U.S. National Register of Historic Places
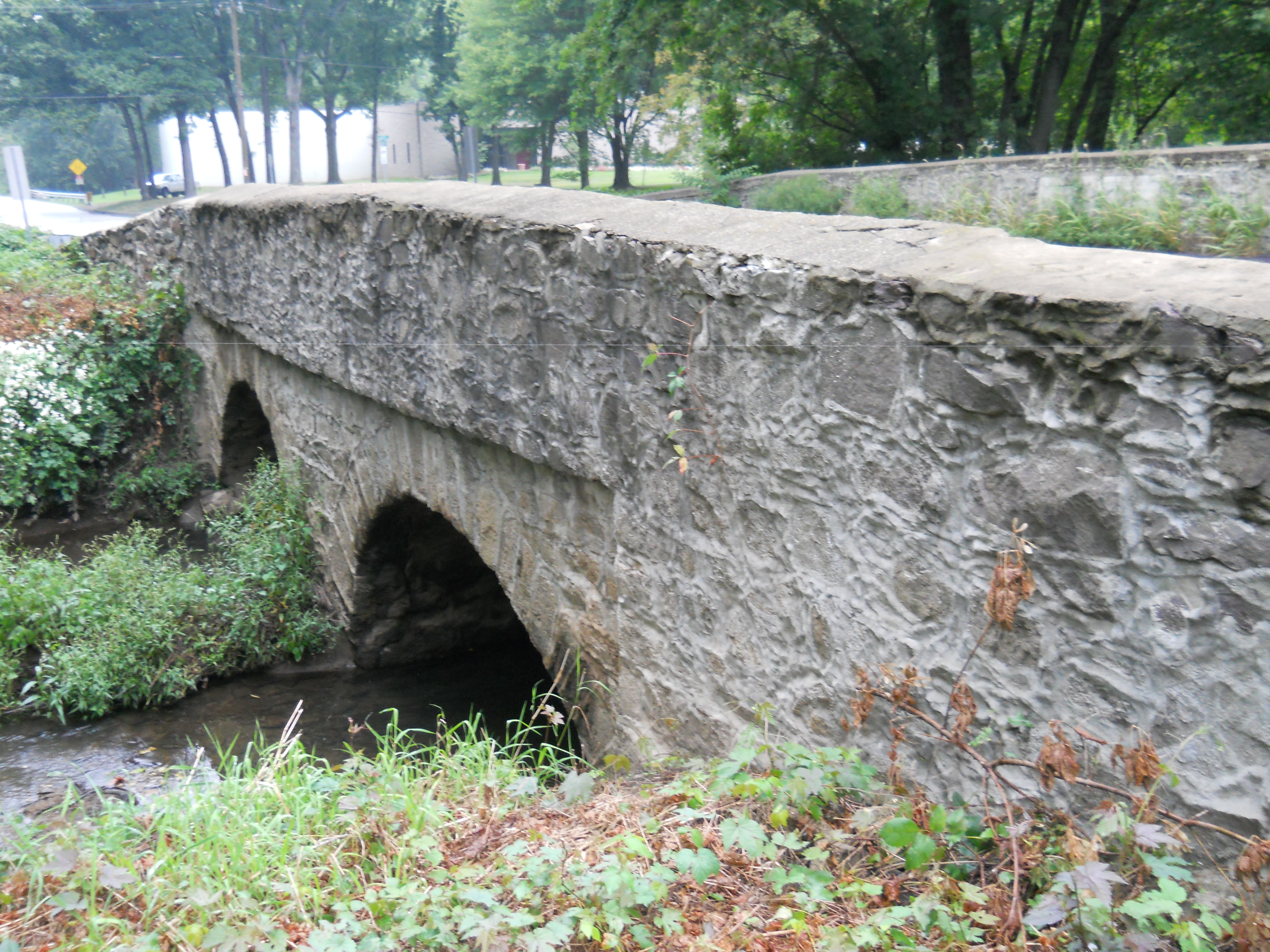

- Location within Pennsylvania Location within the United States
- Location: Byberry Road over a branch of Pennypack Creek, between Bryn Athyn and Lower Moreland Township, Pennsylvania
- Coordinates: 40°9′31″N 75°4′30″W
- Area: less than one acre
- Built: 1828, 1858
- Architectural style: Multi-span stone arch
- MPS: Highway Bridges Owned by the Commonwealth of Pennsylvania, Department of Transportation TR
- NRHP reference No.: 88000831
- Added to NRHP: June 22, 1988

Bryn Athyn-Lower Moreland Bridge is a historic stone arch bridge located between Bryn Athyn and Lower Moreland Township, Montgomery County, Pennsylvania. The bridge was built in 1828 and in 1858. It has two 12-foot-long (3.7 m), semi-circular spans with an overall length of 75-foot (23 m). The bridge crosses a branch of Pennypack Creek.

It was listed on the National Register of Historic Places in 1988.
