= Mickey Charles =

- Born: Charles Tucker; November 1935; Bronx, New York, U.S.
- Died: December 28, 2018 (aged 83); Huntingdon Valley, Pennsylvania, U.S.
- Education: Columbia University; Kalamazoo College (B.A.); Brooklyn Law School (L.L.B.)

Mickey Charles (born Charles Tucker; November 1935 – December 28, 2018) was an American businessman and sports radio personality, who founded Dial Sports "976" scorephone network, one of the earliest pay-per-call services that provided frequent score updates on games. Additionally, he founded The Sports Network, an international wire service providing sports information. One of the first voices for sports gambling, Charles also wrote a gambling column for The Philadelphia Inquirer and hosted a gambling-oriented sports talk show on the weekends on WCAU and ESPN.

== Early life ==
Mickey Charles (born as Charles Tucker) was born in November 1935 and raised in the Bronx, New York. Charles graduated high school at 15-years-old and attended Columbia University where he played on the basketball team. After two years, he transferred to Division III Kalamazoo College and was the captain of their basketball team during his senior season in 1956. Charles then received a law degree from Brooklyn Law School.

== Career ==
After graduating from law school, Charles worked as a stock broker and then as a divorce lawyer. However, he did not believe he was destined to work in either industry. In the early 1960s, Charles attempted to work as a standup comedian. He moved to Philadelphia to be an English professor at St. Joseph's University and to write as a columnist for The Philadelphia Inquirer.

Beginning in the late 1970s, Charles hosted a sports-gambling oriented show on WCAU. He would frequently feature Las Vegas-based sportsbook executives and handicappers on his show. The show ran for four hours on Saturdays and three hours on Sundays. As the show grew in popularity, it was eventually sponsored by Caesars Atlantic City and produced in Atlantic City as a variety show. After two years on the radio, the show was moved to Las Vegas and produced as a television show and broadcast on ESPN. However, the commute from Philadelphia to Las Vegas became taxing for Charles and he gave up the show after about a year.

In 1983, Charles founded Dial Sports "976" scorephone network. Dial Sports was one of the earliest pay-per-call services in the nation and provided score updates to sporting events almost entirely to gamblers. At its peak, Dial Sports was receiving 20 million phone calls a month. Dial Sports' operation was run out of Charles' garage at his home in Huntingdon Valley, Pennsylvania. In the mid-1980s, Dial Sports expanded to include multiple regional locations.

With the advent of the internet, Dial Sports evolved into the Computer Information Network and eventually The Sports Network, an international wire service providing sports information. The Sports Network was sold to STATS in 2015.

In 1987, Charles and The Sports Network created the FCS Awards - including the Eddie Robinson Award and Jerry Rice Award - given to the best players in the NCAA Division I Football Championship Subdivision. The Sports Network also published a weekly Top 25 poll of FCS teams. The Mickey Charles Award, given to an FCS athlete for excellence on the field and in the classroom, was established in 2014.
