= Bethayres, Pennsylvania =

Unincorporated community in Pennsylvania, US

Bethayres
- Unincorporated community
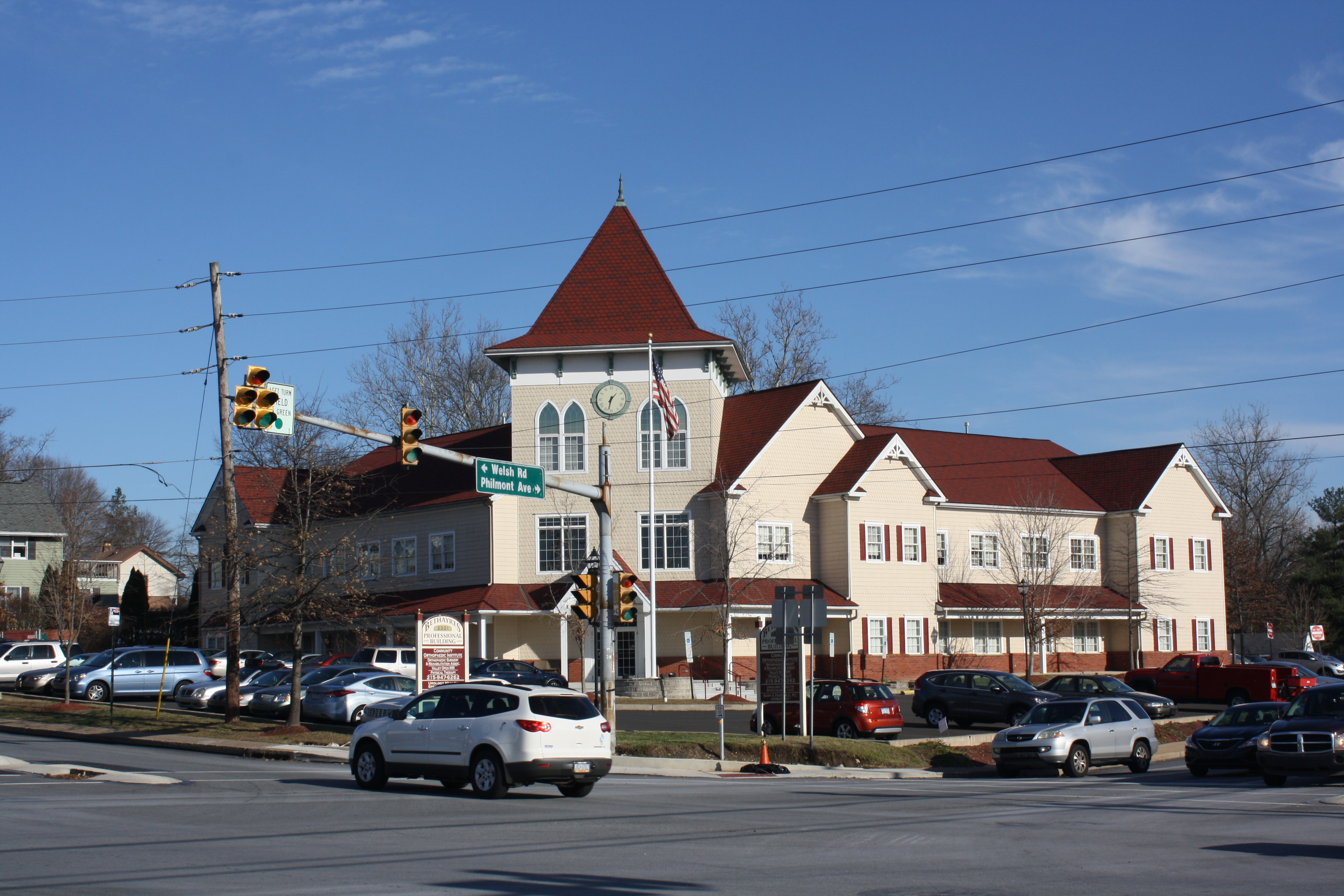
- Corner of Huntingdon Pk. and Philmont Ave.

- Location of Bethayres in Pennsylvania Bethayres (the United States)
- Coordinates: 40°06′50″N 75°04′16″W
- Country: United States
- State: Pennsylvania
- County: Montgomery
- Township: Lower Moreland
- Elevation: 144 ft (44 m)
- Time zone: UTC-5 (EST)
  - Summer (DST): UTC-4 (EDT)
- Area codes: 215, 267 and 445

Bethayres is an unincorporated community in Lower Moreland Township, Montgomery County, Pennsylvania, United States. It is named for Elizabeth Ayres, who lived at 2410 Huntingdon Pike, in a house now owned by Huntingdon Valley Presbyterian Church. As an unincorporated place, it is served by the Huntingdon Valley post office; for this reason, it is often said to be a section of Huntingdon Valley.

Bethayres has a station on the SEPTA West Trenton Regional Rail line, providing access to Philadelphia and New Jersey.

== History ==
The community got its name when the railroad came to the area in the 1870s. Elizabeth Ayres, a local woman, had a son who worked for Reading Railroad. He named the station after his mother, and the community around the station and around the intersection of Welsh Rd and Huntingdon Pike became known as Bethayres. Bethayres and its northern neighbor, Huntingdon Valley had separate post offices until they became one post office. Until the name was changed to solely Huntingdon Valley Post Office, Huntingdon Valley-Bethayres was the longest postal name in the United States.

On January 3, 1989, the community made headlines when Bucks County resident Glen Alton Barhight stole a SEPTA bus, and began a series of events which resulted in the injury of 15 people, the damage or destruction of 15 cars, and a police chase through five municipalities which ended when the bus crashed into a tree in Bethayres.

== Gallery ==
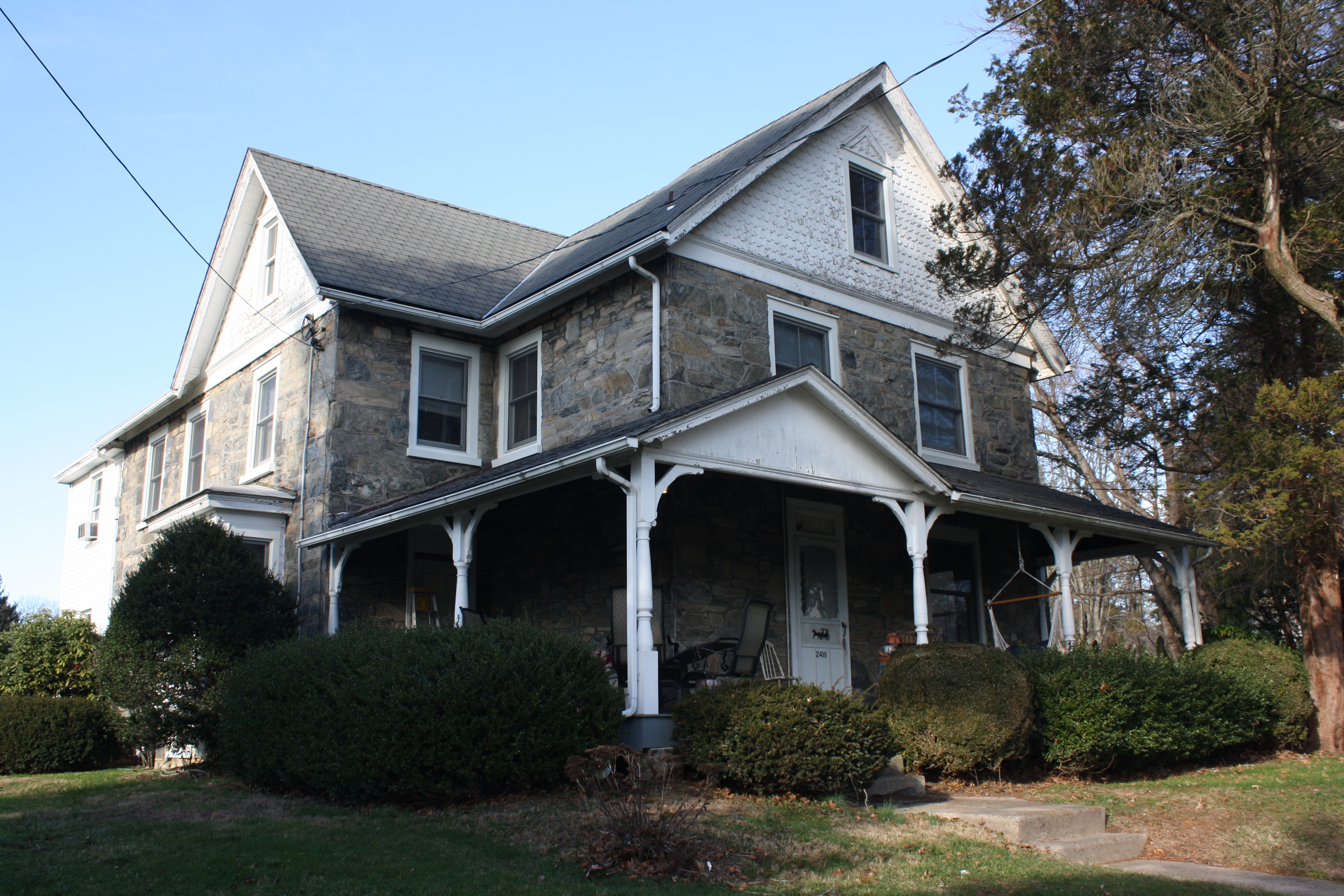
Elizabeth Ayres House.

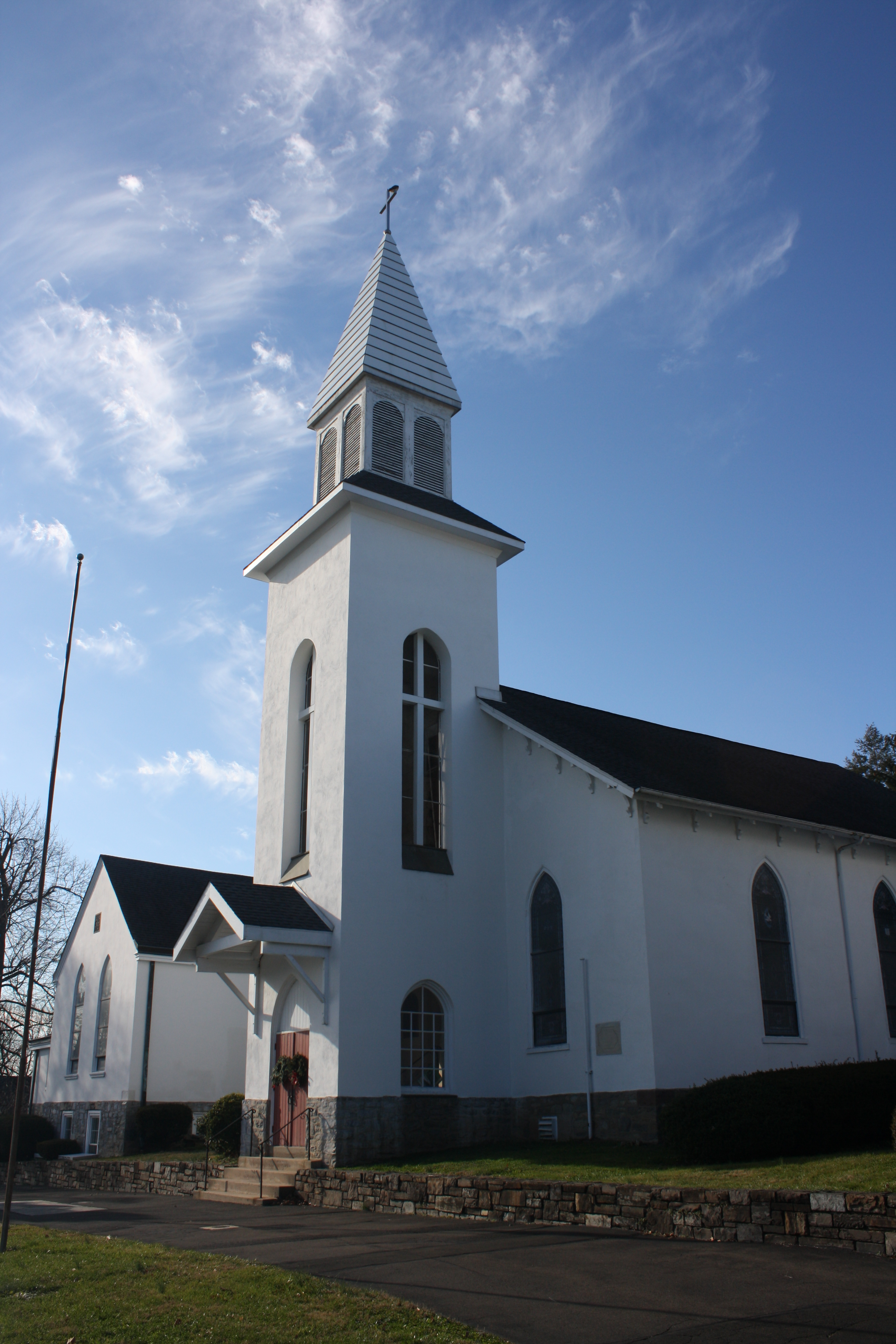
Huntingdon Valley Presbyterian Church.

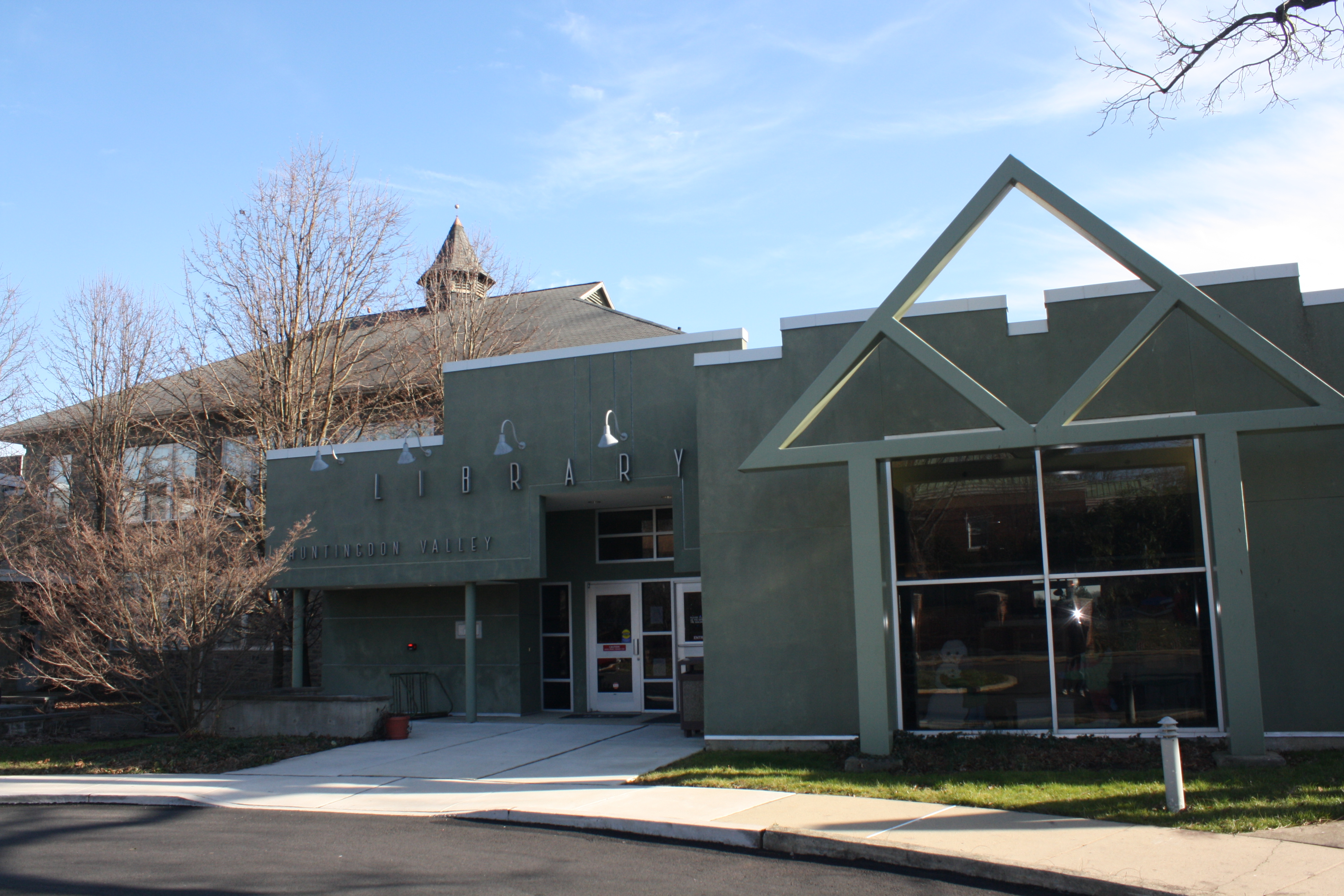
Huntingdon Valley Library.

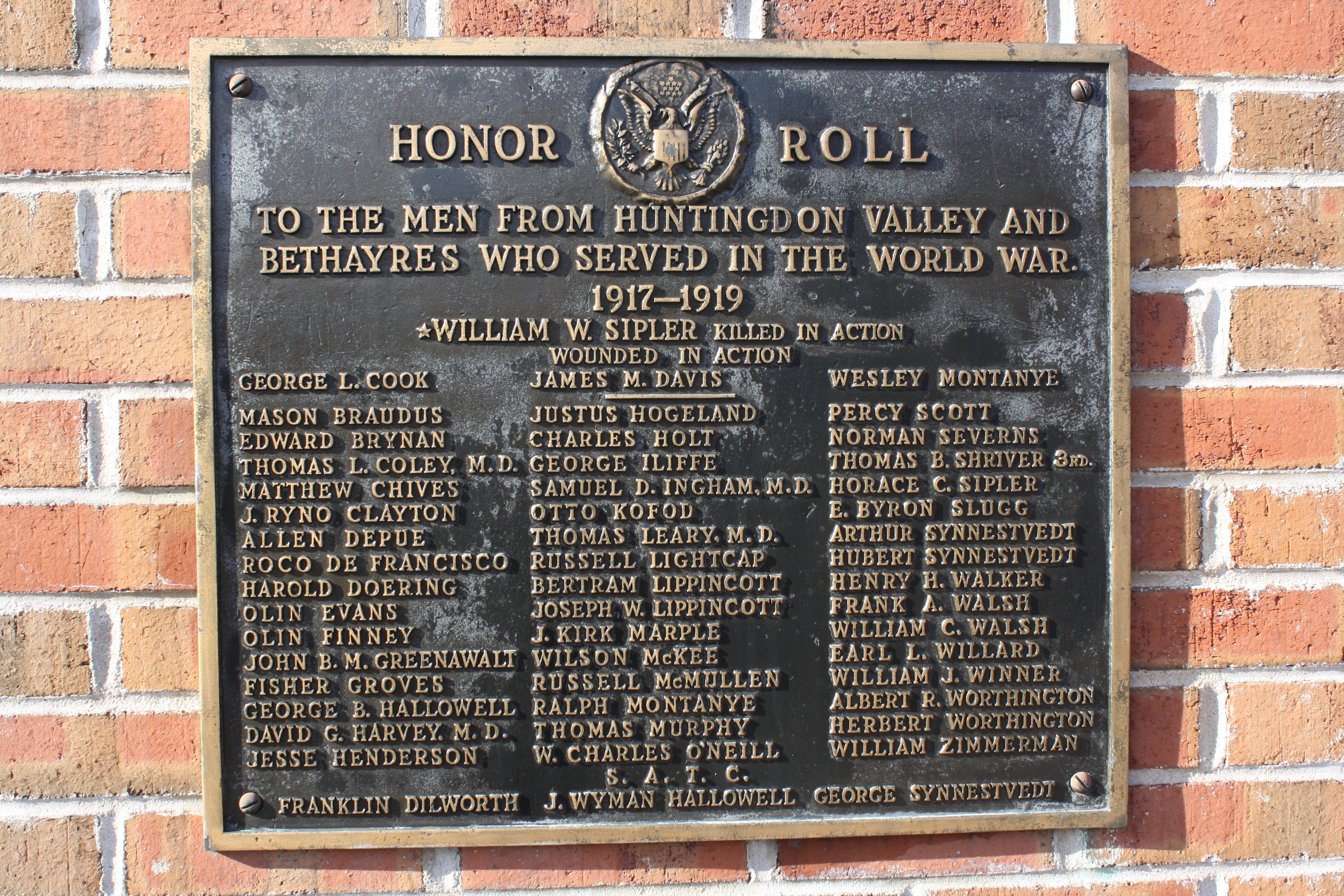
Honor Roll (near Huntingdon Valley Library).

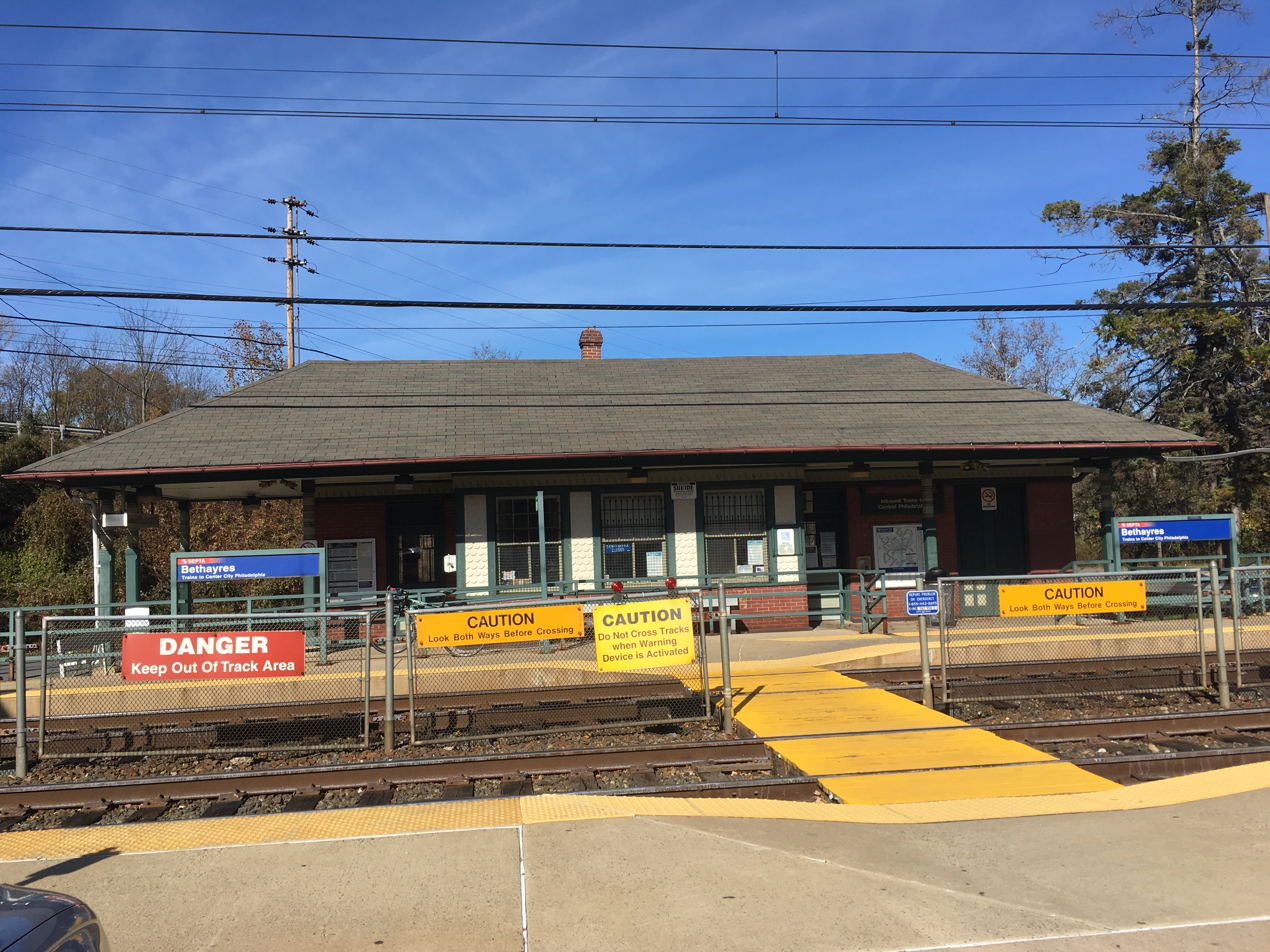
Bethayres Station.
