= Noble, Pennsylvania =

Unincorporated community in Pennsylvania, US

- Unincorporated community
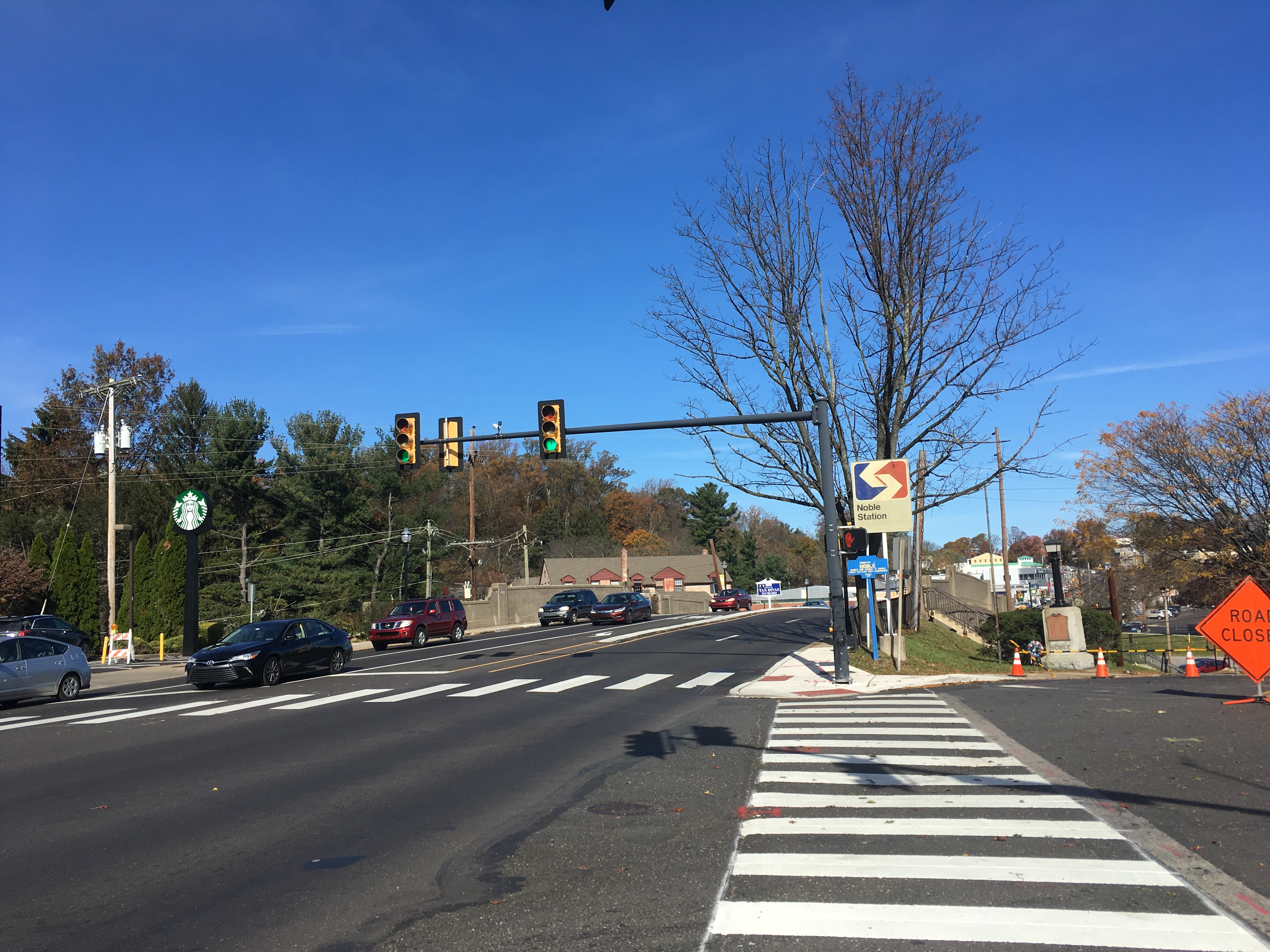
- Old York Road (PA 611) in Noble

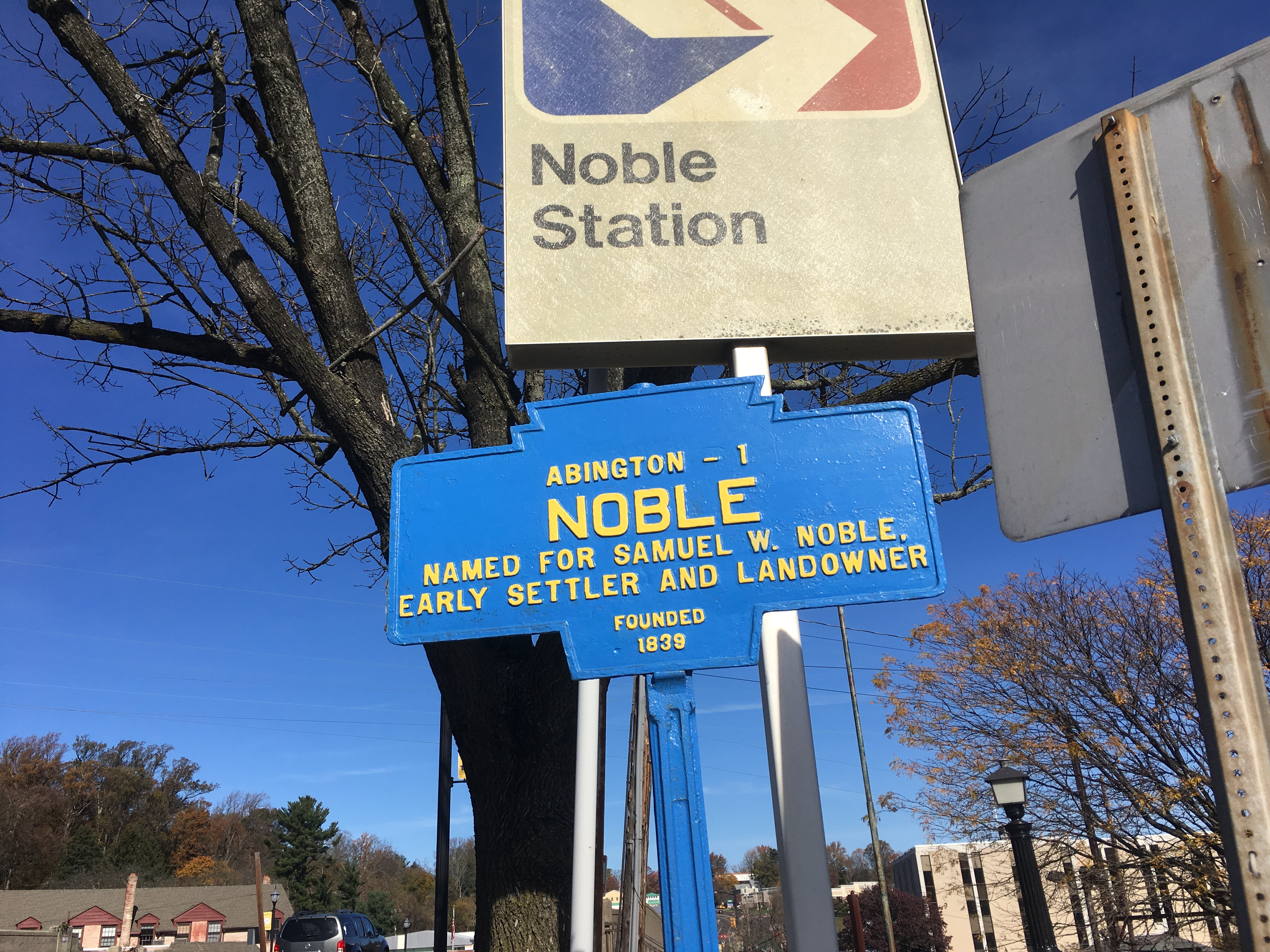
- Keystone Marker

- Location within Pennsylvania Location within the United States
- Coordinates: 40°06′20″N 75°07′30″W
- Country: United States
- State: Pennsylvania
- County: Montgomery
- Township: Abington
- Elevation: 220 ft (67 m)
- Time zone: UTC-5 (Eastern (EST))
  - Summer (DST): UTC-4 (EDT)
- ZIP code: 19046
- Area codes: 215, 267 and 445
- GNIS feature ID: 1193029

Noble is an unincorporated community in Abington Township in Montgomery County, Pennsylvania, United States. Noble is located at the intersection of Pennsylvania Route 611 (Old York Road) and Baeder Road, north of Jenkintown. The community is served by the Noble station along SEPTA Regional Rail's West Trenton Line. Noble uses the Jenkintown ZIP code of 19046.
