= Pennypack Creek =

River in Pennsylvania, United States

Coordinates: 40.07501°N 75.06056°W

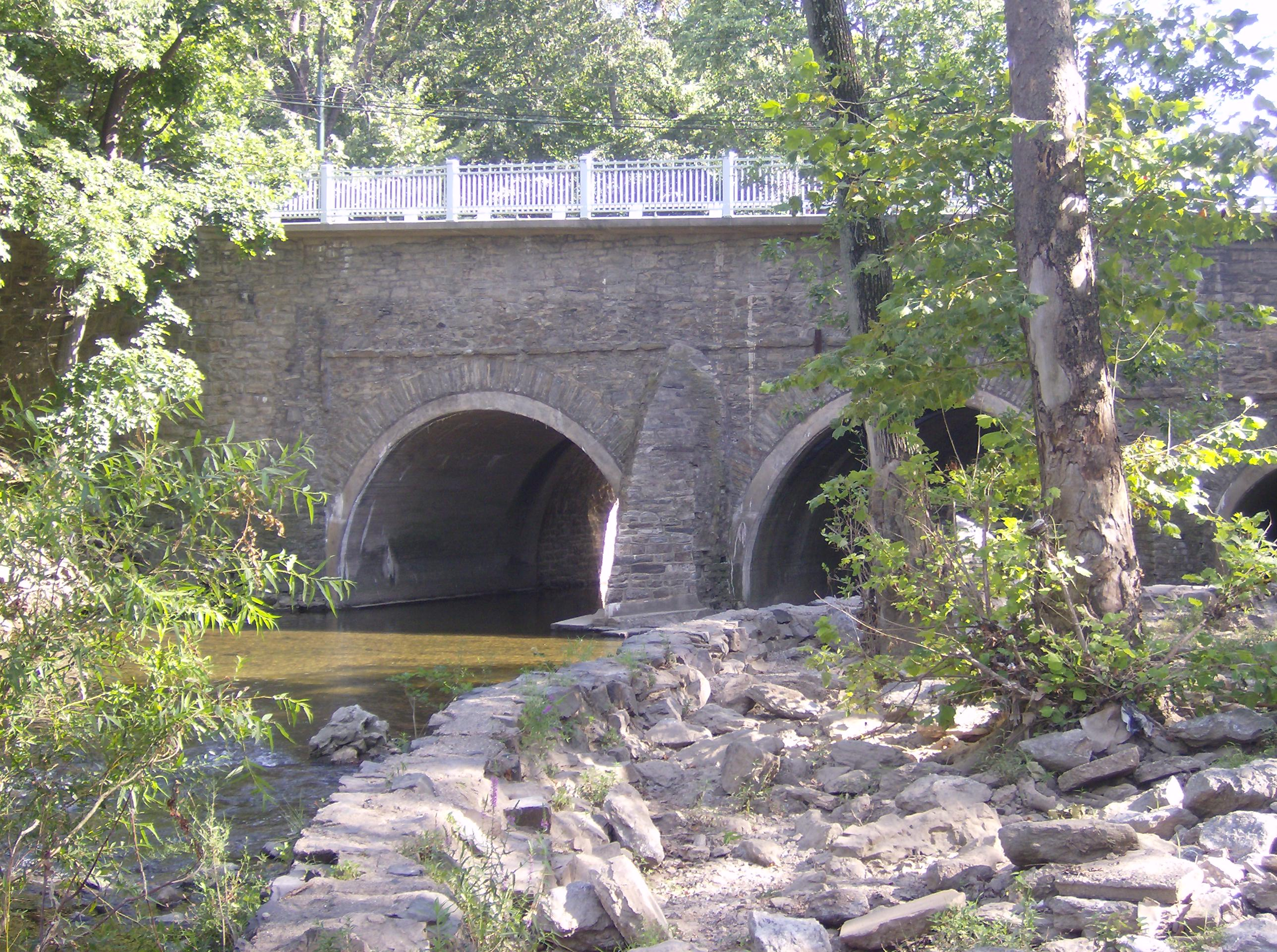
Historic Frankford Avenue Bridge over the Pennypack in Holmesburg

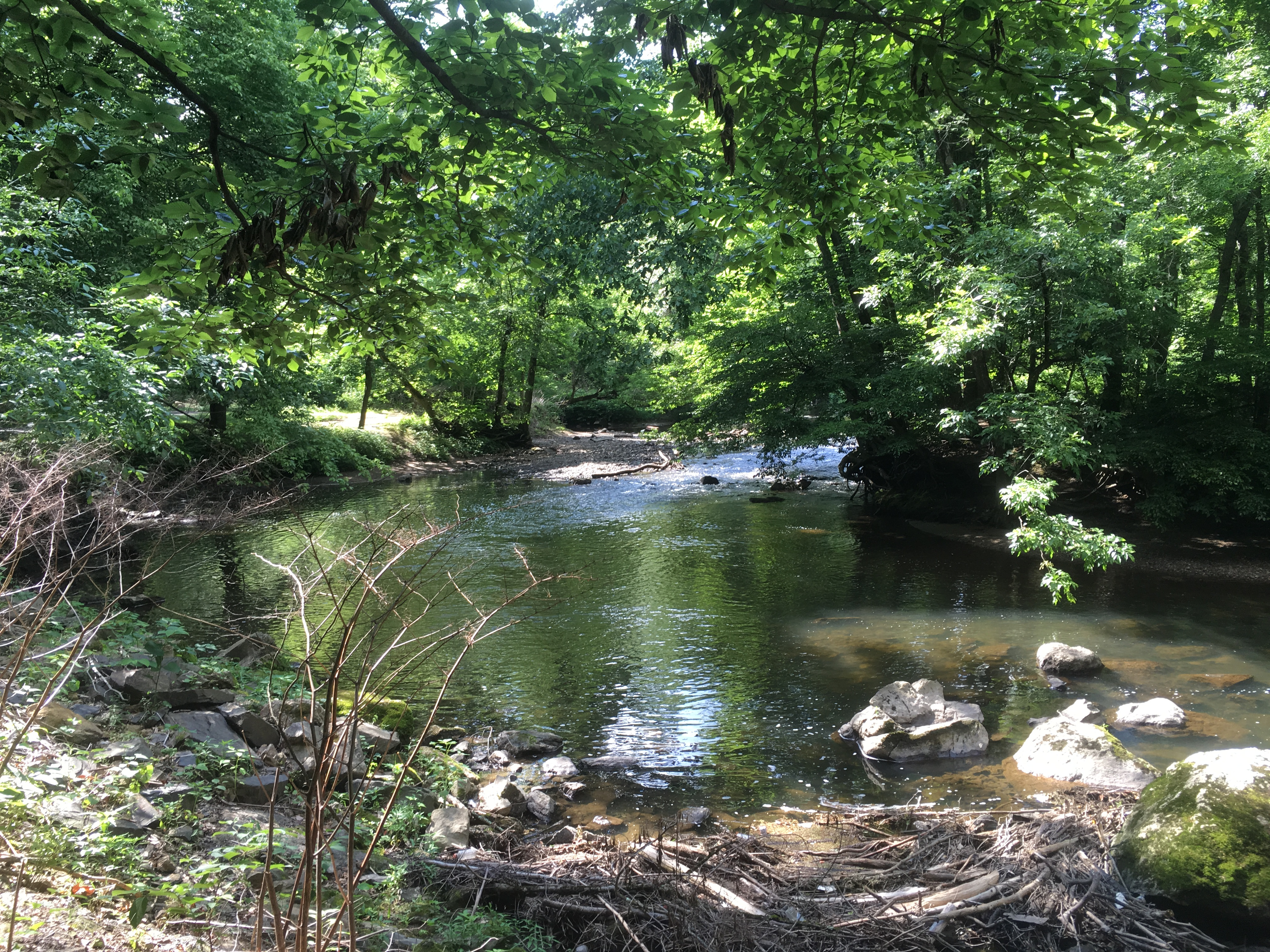
The Pennypack Creek in Pennypack Park in Northeast Philadelphia

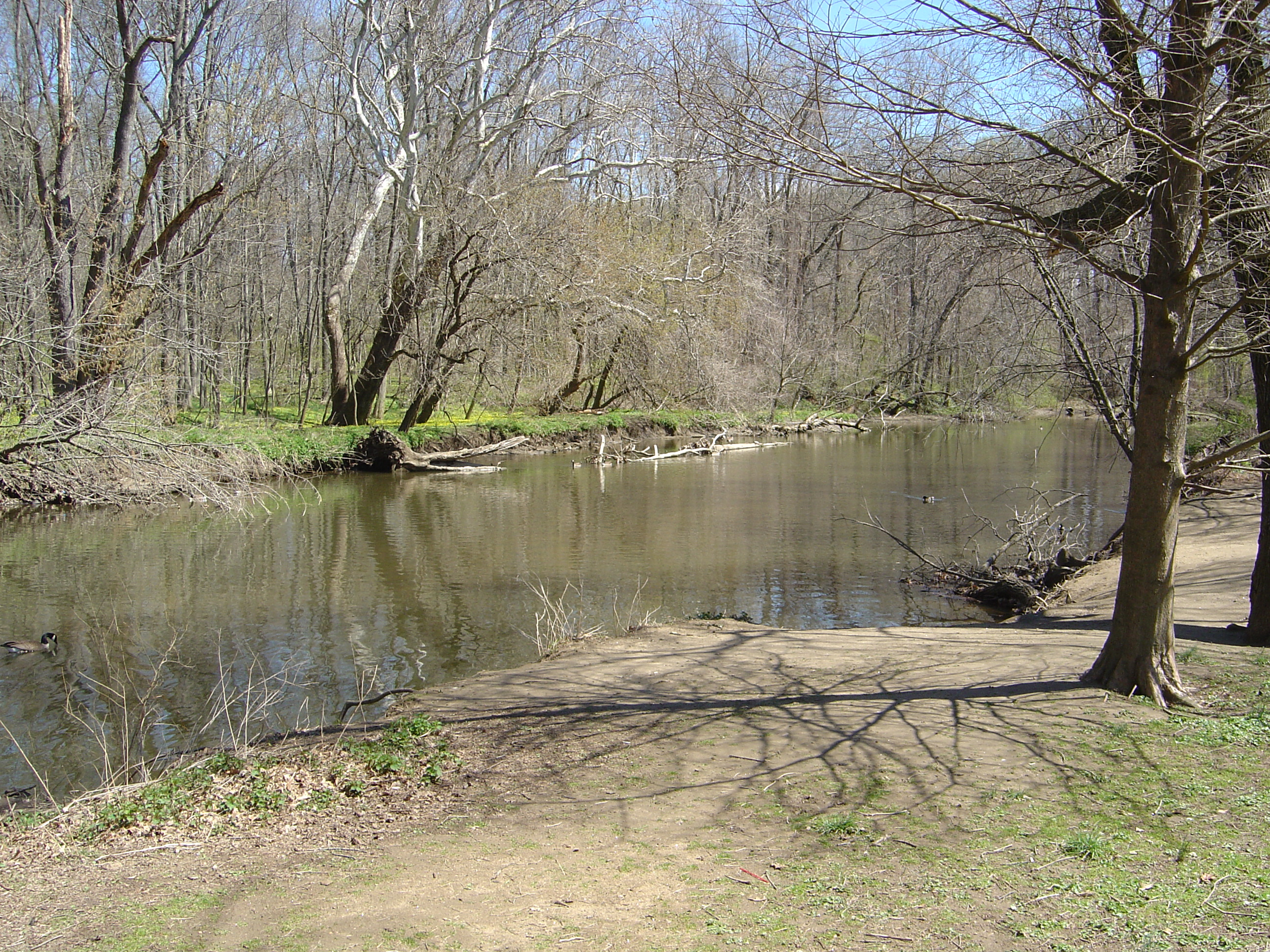
Pennypack Creek near Pine Road in Fox Chase

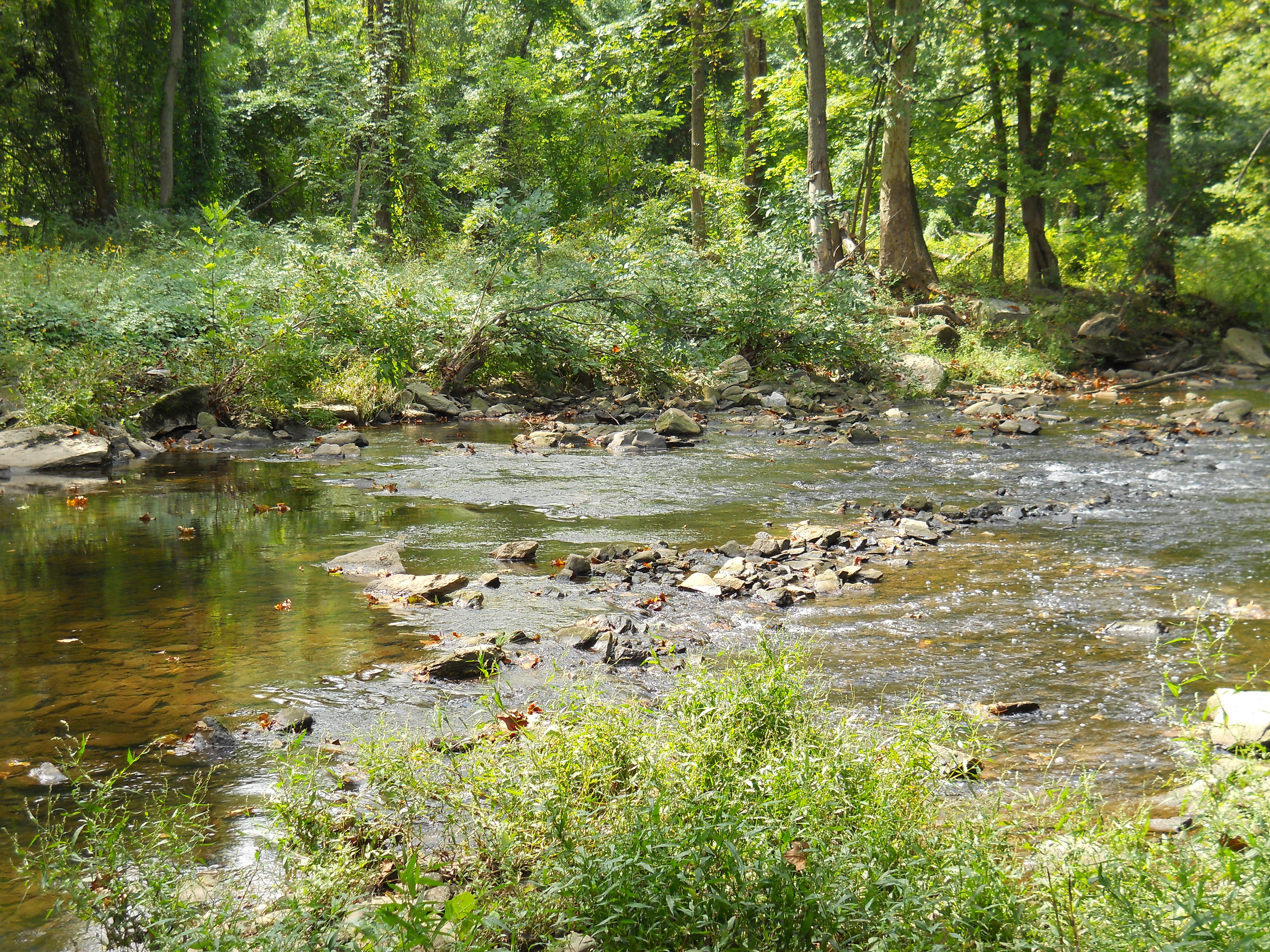
Pennypack Creek near Fetter's Mill.

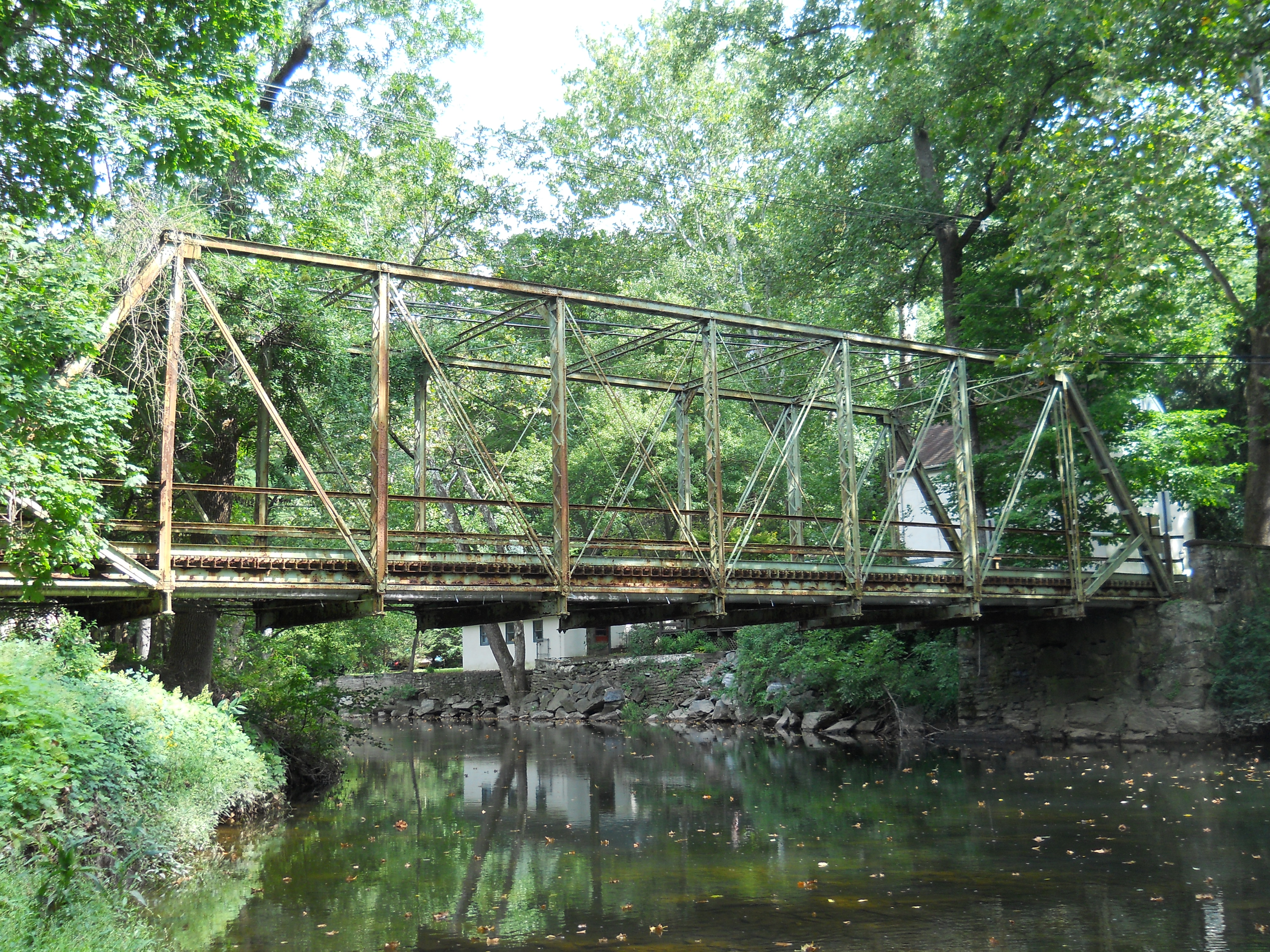
Fetters Mill Road Bridge in Fetter's Mill Village Historic District.

Pennypack Creek is a 22.6-mile-long (36.4 km) creek in southeastern Pennsylvania in the United States. It runs southeast through lower Bucks County, eastern Montgomery County and the northeast section of Philadelphia, before emptying into the Delaware River.

== Name ==
The creek draws its name from the Lenape word pënëpèkw meaning "downward-flowing water" or "deep, dead water; water without much current." Early cartographers gave various spellings for the name, including Pennishpaska, La Riviere de Pennicpacka, and Pennishpacha Kyl. In early Swedish patents it was called Pemipacka. Thomas Holme called it Dublin Creek, while in later maps it is called Pennypack and Pennepack.

== Course ==
The Pennypack creek was first surveyed by Thomas Holme in 1687. The creek begins in two branches, one in Horsham, the other in Warminster, joining in Bryn Athyn. The creek then flows through Lower Moreland, Abington and Northeast Philadelphia.

== Early use as an industrial waterway ==
Pennypack Creek was once the site of several mills. When William Penn founded the province of Pennsylvania in 1682, the Pennypack valley was occupied by Swedish colonists, who continued to live as English settlement began. Penn ordered the first bridge built across the creek along the King's Highway (now Frankford Avenue) in 1697; the bridge still stands. Despite the lack of navigability beyond the Fall Line (near the Frankford Avenue bridge), several early settlers built mills along the Pennypack, including Penn's "Pemmapecka Mill," built in 1701. The mills contributed to the growth of Holmesburg, the neighborhood near the mouth of the creek, and provided local farmers a place to sell their grain that was nearer than the city of Philadelphia. Fetter's Mill was added to the National Register of Historic Places in 1999.

== Conversion to parkland ==
With the development of steam power in the Industrial Revolution, water power's influence on industry declined. As a result, many of the mills on the Pennypack closed, and by 1905 the land around it was acquired by the city for parkland. The creek now runs through Pennypack Park in Philadelphia and Lorimer Park in Montgomery County.

Segments of park trail help form the East Coast Greenway, a 3,000 mile long trail system connecting Maine to Florida.

== Historic bridges ==
Several historic bridges cross Pennypack Creek and its tributaries.

- The Frankford Avenue Bridge, a triple-span stone-arch bridge built in 1697, carries Frankford Avenue. It is the oldest stone bridge in the United States still in use.
- The Fetters Mill Road Bridge, a Pratt through-truss bridge built in 1883, has been closed to traffic since the early 2010s. It is still open to pedestrian and bicycle traffic.
- The Krewstown Road Bridge, a stone arch bridge built in 1800 and rehabilitated 1907, is still in use.
- The Holme Avenue Bridge, a closed-spandrel concrete arch bridge built in 1918, is still in use.
- The Roosevelt Boulevard Bridge, a closed-spandrel concrete arch bridge built in 1920, is still in use.
- The Holme Avenue Bridge, a closed-spandrel concrete arch bridge across Wooden Bridge Run built in 1921, is still in use.
- The Ryan Avenue Bridge, a closed-spandrel concrete arch bridge over Sandy Run built in 1929, is still in use.
- The Rhawn Street Bridges, two closed-spandrel concrete arches bridge built in 1930, are still in use.

== See also ==
- List of Pennsylvania rivers
