= Rydal station =

Pennsylvania SEPTA station

Rydal
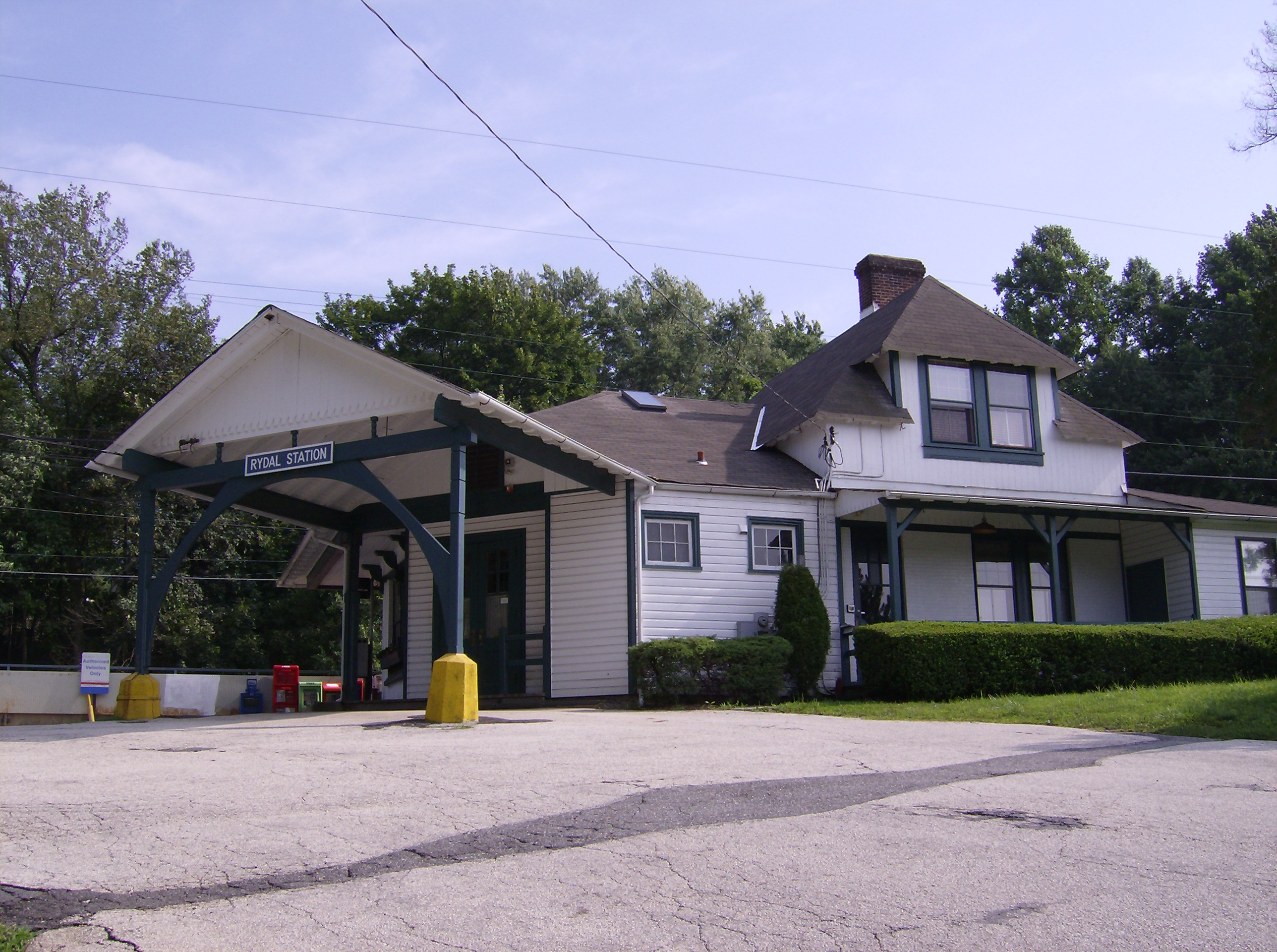

General information
- Location: Susquehanna Road and Washington Lane; Abington Township, Pennsylvania 19006
- Coordinates: 40.1075°N 75.1107°W
- Owner: SEPTA
- Line: Neshaminy Line
- Platforms: 2 side platforms
- Tracks: 2

Construction
- Parking: 43
- Accessible: No

Other information
- Fare zone: 3

History
- Opened: 1888
- Electrified: July 26, 1931

Services
Preceding station	SEPTA	Following station
Noble toward Penn Medicine Station	West Trenton Line	Meadowbrook toward West Trenton
Former services
Preceding station	Reading Railroad	Following station
Noble toward Philadelphia	New York Branch	Meadowbrook toward Bound Brook
Location

Rydal station is a station along the SEPTA West Trenton Line to Ewing, New Jersey. It is located at Susquehanna Road and Old Valley Road in the Rydal neighborhood of Abington Township, Pennsylvania. In FY 2013, Rydal station had a weekday average of 147 boardings and 138 alightings. The station has off-street parking and now houses a post office.

Rydal station was originally built in 1888 by the Reading Railroad, and is located on the north side of the tracks off of Susquehanna Road. An open sheltered shed can be found on Washington Lane, and the intersection of Washington Lane and Susquehanna Road can be found east of the shed beneath an 11'6" bridge under the tracks.

== Station layout ==
Rydal has two low-level side platforms.
