= Fetter's Mill =

Historic grist mill in Pennsylvania

- U.S. National Register of Historic Places
- U.S. Historic district – Contributing property
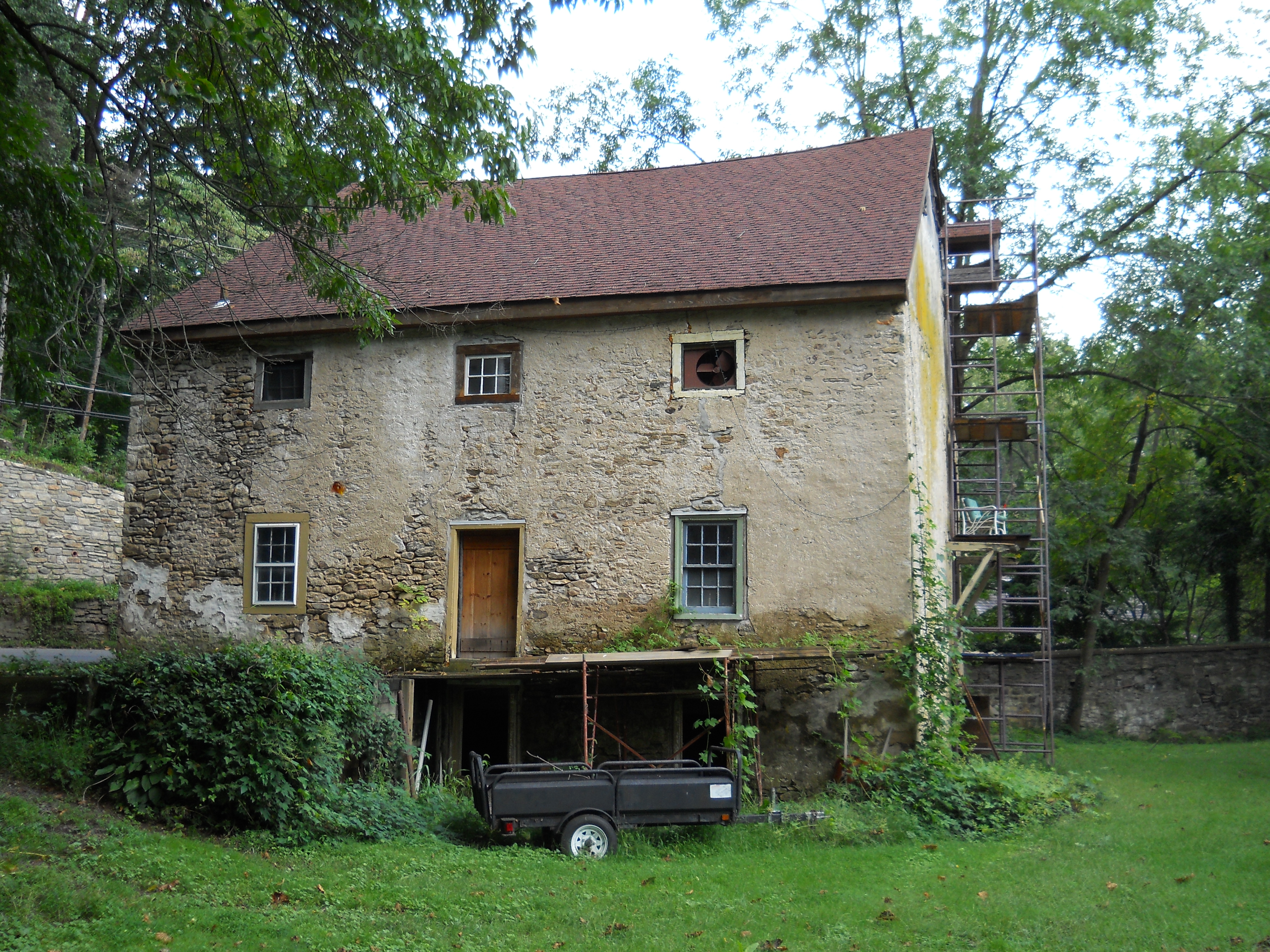
- Fetter's Mill, September 2012

- Location within Pennsylvania Location within the United States
- Location: 2543 Fetter's Mill Dr., Bryn Athyn, Lower Moreland Township, Pennsylvania
- Coordinates: 40°7′47″N 75°4′20″W
- Area: less than one acre
- Built: 1860
- Built by: Amos Addis, Gerald Glenn, Louis Ewald
- NRHP reference No.: 99000647
- Added to NRHP: May 27, 1999

Fetter's Mill, also known as Louis Ewald Studio—Residence, is a historic grist mill located on Pennypack Creek at Bryn Athyn in Lower Moreland Township, Montgomery County, Pennsylvania. It was built in the 1740s, and is a five level, stucco over stone building of post and beam construction. It has an end gabled roof. It was enlarged about 1860, and in 1920 was converted to a residence and studio for decorative artist Louis Ewald. Adjacent to the mill is the contributing tail race.

== History ==
The parcel of land Fetter's Mill is on was once owned by William Penn until it was sold to Nicholas More on January 5, 1681/1682 when it became known as the "Manor of Moreland". In 1711 after More's death, the land was bought by Richard Hill, who upon his death in 1729 left the land to his niece who married Samuel Preston. The estate became known as "Hills Highland" and a mill was constructed between 1739 and 1750 on the land.

Ownership of the land transferred to Jonathan Paxson in 1786 and then to Thomas Longstroth in 1794. In 1860, George Fetter bought the mill and enlarged it. At the end of the century, the mill ceased operations after the water level in Pennypack Creek dropped, making continuous mill operation impossible. Artist Louis Ewald began renting the mill in 1920 to use as a studio and home, occupying it for 55 years.

It was added to the National Register of Historic Places in 1999 for its historically significant association with the early milling industry and as the studio of Louis Ewald. It is located in the Fetter's Mill Village Historic District.
