= Huntingdon Valley, Pennsylvania =

Unincorporated community in Pennsylvania, US

Huntingdon Valley
- Village
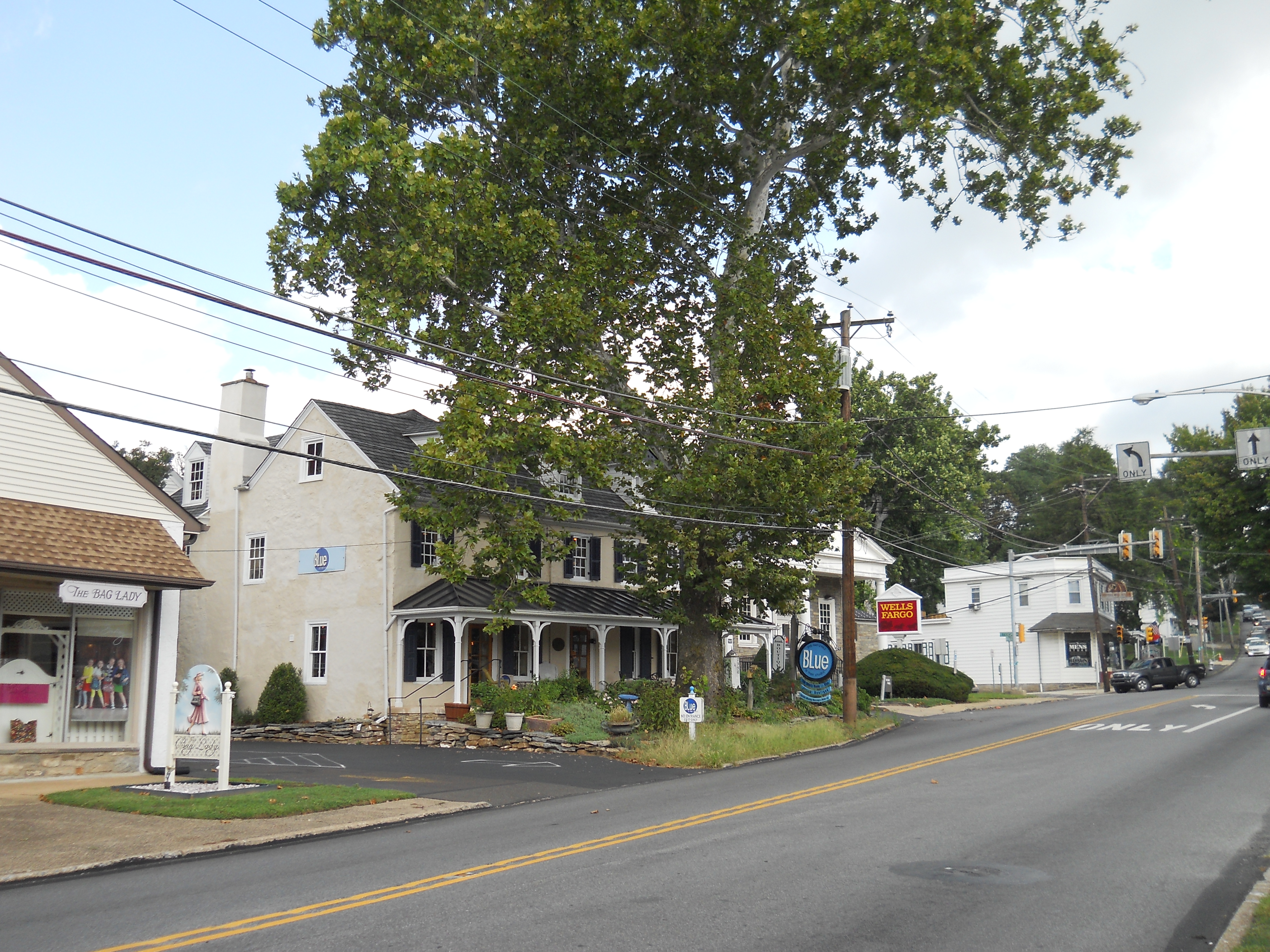
- Lady Washington Inn on Huntingdon Pike

- Location of Huntingdon Valley in Pennsylvania Huntingdon Valley (the United States)
- Coordinates: 40°07′00″N 75°02′59″W
- Country: United States
- State: Pennsylvania
- County: Montgomery, Bucks
- Elevation: 223 ft (68 m)
- Time zone: UTC-5 (EST)
  - Summer (DST): UTC-4 (EDT)
- ZIP Code: 19006
- Area codes: 215, 267 and 445

Huntingdon Valley is a village, as well as a suburban mailing address located in Lower Moreland Township, Upper Moreland Township and Abington Township all in Montgomery County, and in small sections of Upper Southampton Township and Lower Southampton Township in Bucks County, Pennsylvania, United States, bordering the Fox Chase, Bustleton, and Somerton sections of Philadelphia.

== History ==
Huntingdon Valley was originally formed from the land given by John Boutcher to his son upon his death.The village of Huntingdon Valley is located along Huntingdon Pike (Pennsylvania Route 232). The Lady Washington Inn was added to the National Register of Historic Places in 1982. The inn is believed to have held first lady Martha Washington while George Washington was at Valley Forge. The region saw early settlements and mills along the Pennypack Creek. The Fetter's Mill Village Historic District is located in the valley through which the Pennypack Creek flows. The area surrounding the original village was very rural up until the latter half of the 20th century.

== Living standards ==
Originally referred to as Goosetown, Huntingdon Valley boasts some of the highest standards of living in the Greater Philadelphia area with 90% of the Township being single-dwelling homes and having one of the highest per capita incomes in Montgomery County, Pennsylvania.

Huntingdon Valley (ZIP 19006), Pennsylvania, sales tax rate is 6.00%. Income tax is 3.07%. The income per capita is $45,125, which includes all adults and children. The median household income is $94,961.

== Lorimer Park ==
Located within Huntingdon Valley is Lorimer Park, 213 acres (0.86 km^{2}) of woods and meadows connected to Pennypack Park of the Fox Chase section of Philadelphia County. The park borders Fox Chase Farm, one of the two remaining active farms in Philadelphia County.

== School districts ==
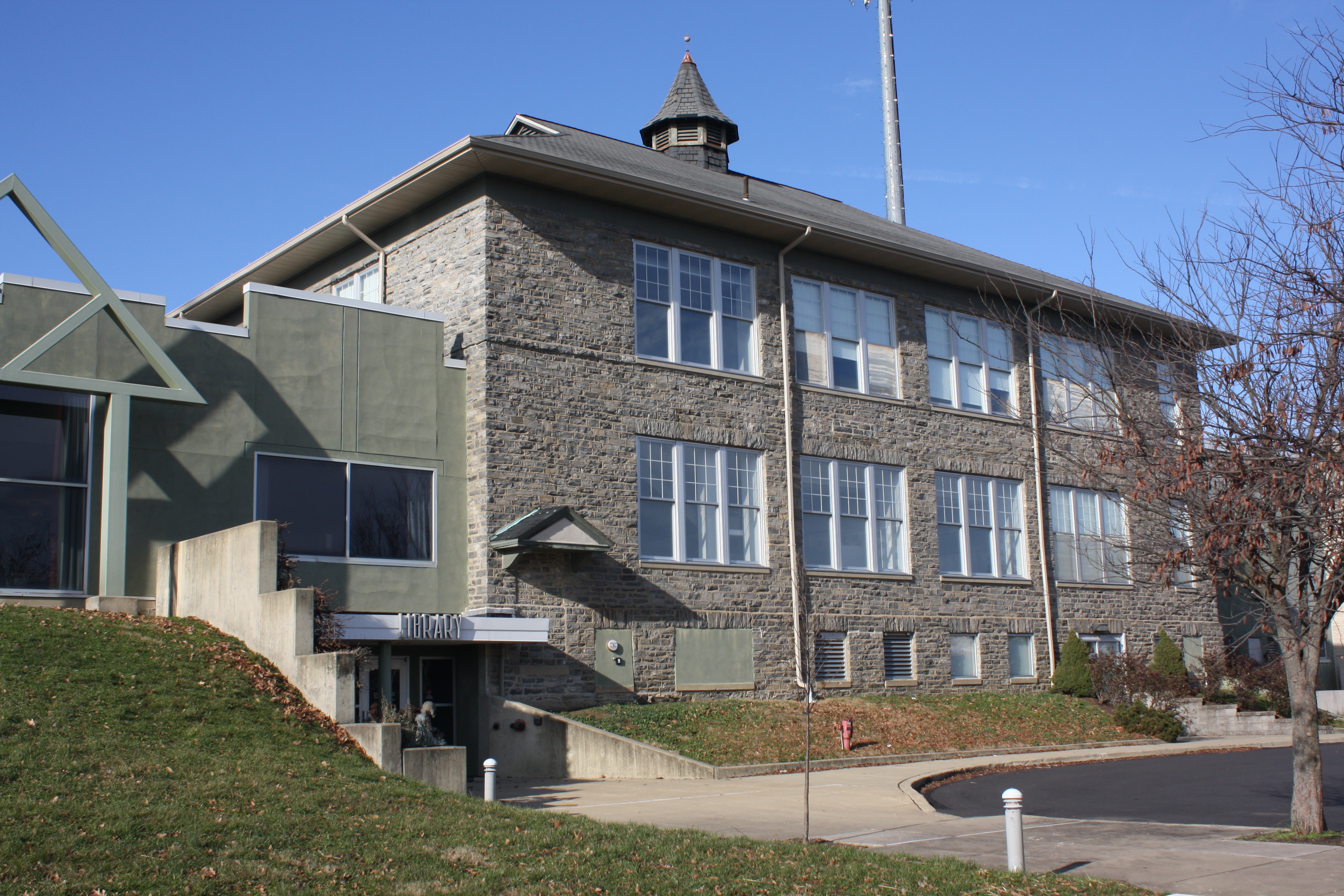
Huntingdon Valley Library

Students in Huntingdon Valley attend several school districts, including Lower Moreland Township School District, comprising Pine Road Elementary School, Murray Avenue School (formerly Lower Moreland Middle School), and Lower Moreland High School; Upper Moreland School District; and Abington School District, comprising seven elementary schools, Abington Junior High School, and Abington Senior High School. Also, residents who live in Bucks County attend Centennial School District. The movie Can't Hardly Wait was written and directed by Lower Moreland Alumnus Harry Elfont and is based on his experience at Lower Moreland High School.

== Passenger trains ==
Huntingdon Valley had regularly scheduled passenger train service until January 14, 1983, via SEPTA's Fox Chase-Newtown Rapid Transit Line; service ended due to failing diesel train equipment resulting in low ridership. Although rail service was initially replaced with a Fox Chase-Newtown shuttle bus, patronage remained light. The traveling public never saw a bus service as a suitable replacement for a rail service, and the Fox Chase-Newtown shuttle bus service ended in 1999. With no rail or bus service, residents had to use either the Fox Chase train station or the Bethayres train station when traveling to Center City Philadelphia.

In the ensuing years, there was interest in resuming the long-dormant passenger service. In September 2009, the Southampton-based Pennsylvania Transit Expansion Coalition (PA-TEC) began discussions with township officials along the railway, as well as SEPTA officials, about the realistic possibility of resuming even minimal passenger service to relieve traffic congestion in the region.

All plans for resuming the train service were dropped in 2014 when Montgomery County officials decided to extend the Pennypack Trail over the derelict rail bed.

== Valley Swim Club ==
In July 2009, a nationally publicized incident occurred at the Valley Swim Club in Huntingdon Valley. A group of mostly African-American children from a day care center were removed from the club due to the children's race. On July 15, 2009, the day care center successfully filed a federal civil rights lawsuit against the club. In September 2009, the Pennsylvania Human Relations Commission found probable cause that racism was involved. The swim club filed for Chapter 7 bankruptcy on November 15, 2009, and has since gone out of business. United States Chief Bankruptcy Judge Steven Raslavich has jurisdiction over the case and the assets of the club are being administered by United States Trustee Terry P. Dershaw. Financial documents were filed on December 1, 2009. The Valley Swim Club was sold at auction for $1.46 million on Thursday, 13 May 2010.

== Forest Hills Cemetery ==
Forest Hills Cemetery in Huntingdon Valley is the resting place of World War II figure Jack Agnew, loosely the inspiration of the novel and film, The Dirty Dozen.

== Notable people ==
- Jimmy Kieserman, basketball player
- I. Michael Leitman – Surgeon and Dean for Graduate Medical Education at Mount Sinai Health.
- Joseph Thurman Pearson Jr. (1876-1951), painter and PAFA instructor
- John Pitcairn Jr. (1841-1916), founder of Pittsburgh Plate Glass Company and builder of Bryn Athyn Cathedral
- Lawrence Saint (1885-1961), stained glass artist
- Alice Kent Stoddard (1883-1976), portrait and landscape painter
- Nancy Spungen (1958-1978), girlfriend of musician Sid Vicious who famously died under mysterious circumstances in the Hotel Chelsea in 1978
- Collin Gillespie – American professional basketball player

== See also ==
- Bryn Athyn, Pennsylvania
