= Forest Hills station (SEPTA) =

Railway station in Philadelphia

Forest Hills
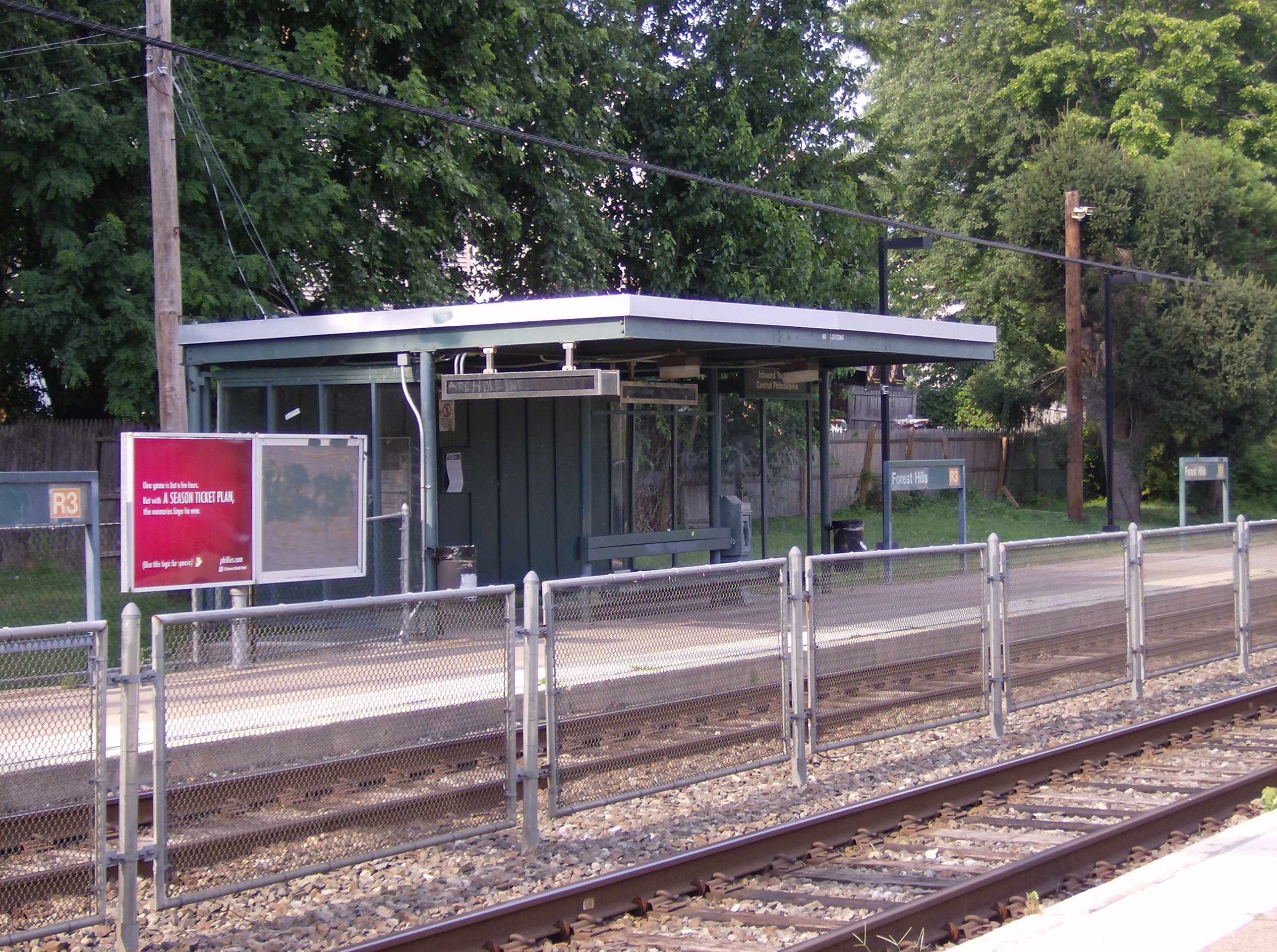
- Forest Hills station in August 2006

General information
- Location: 299 Byberry Road; Philadelphia, Pennsylvania 19116
- Coordinates: 40.1277°N 75.0209°W
- Owner: SEPTA
- Line: Neshaminy Line
- Platforms: 2 side platforms
- Tracks: 2
- Connections: SEPTA City Bus: 84

Construction
- Parking: 155 spaces
- Accessible: Yes

Other information
- Fare zone: 3

History
- Electrified: July 26, 1931

Passengers
- 2017: 367 boardings 378 alightings (weekday average)
- Rank: 73 of 146

Services
| Preceding station | SEPTA | Following station |
|---|---|---|
| Philmont toward Penn Medicine Station | West Trenton Line | Somerton toward West Trenton |
Former services
| Preceding station | Reading Railroad | Following station |
|---|---|---|
| Philmont toward Philadelphia | New York Branch | Somerton toward Bound Brook |
Location

Forest Hills station is a SEPTA Regional Rail station in Philadelphia, Pennsylvania. Located on Byberry Road near Philmont Avenue, it serves the West Trenton Line to Ewing, New Jersey. The station has off-street parking and a handicapped-accessible platform. In FY 2013, Forest Hills station had a weekday average of 434 boardings and 326 alightings.

== Station layout ==
Forest Hills has two low-level side platforms with a mini high-level platform.
