= Meadowbrook station (SEPTA) =

SEPTA station in Abington

Meadowbrook
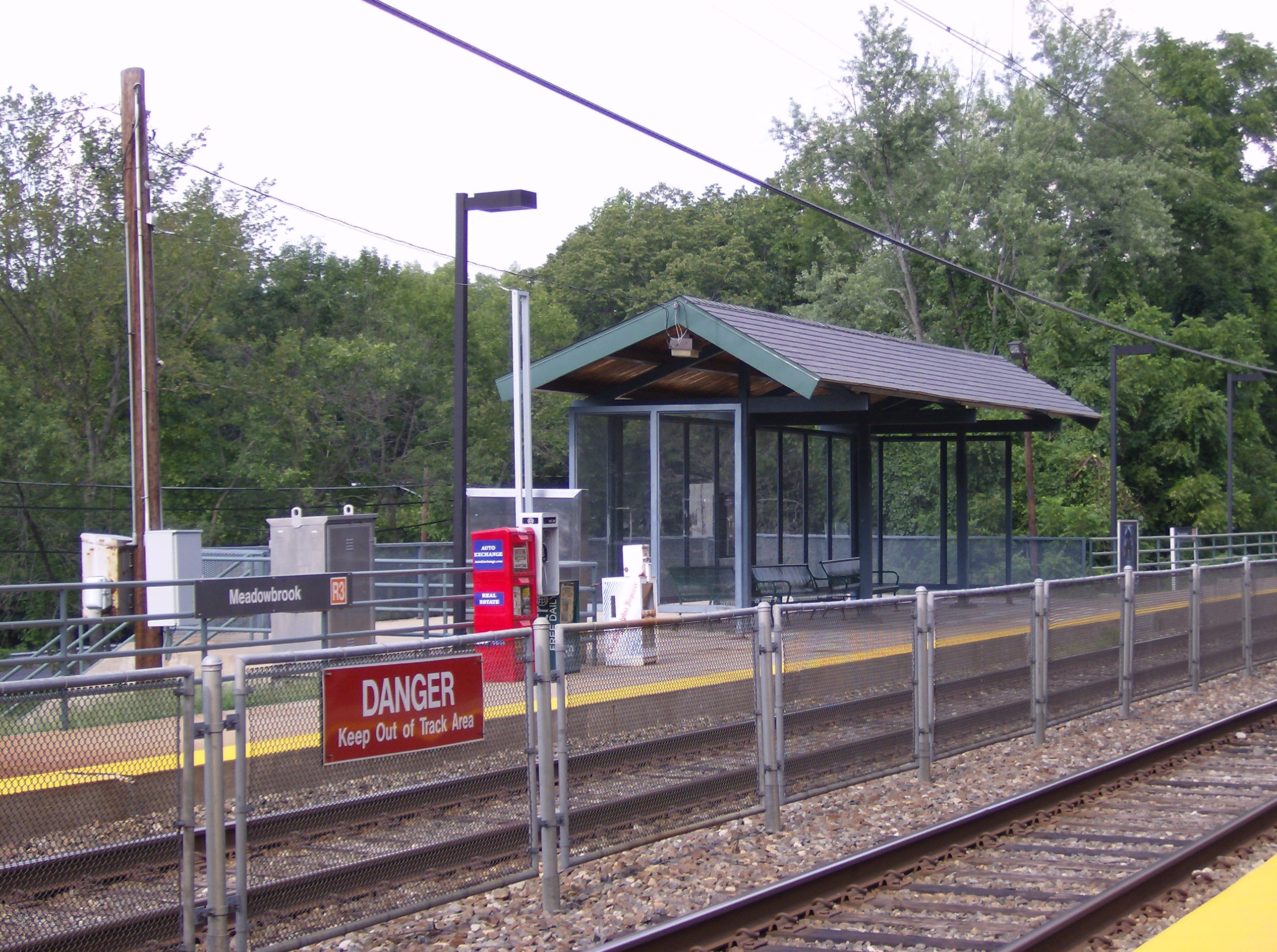

General information
- Location: Mill Road and Lindsay Avenue; Abington Township, Pennsylvania
- Coordinates: 40.1114°N 75.0925°W
- Owner: SEPTA
- Line: Neshaminy Line
- Platforms: 2 side platforms
- Tracks: 2

Construction
- Parking: 90
- Accessible: No

Other information
- Fare zone: 3

History
- Electrified: July 26, 1931

Services
Preceding station	SEPTA	Following station
Rydal toward Penn Medicine Station	West Trenton Line	Bethayres toward West Trenton
Former services
Preceding station	Reading Railroad	Following station
Rydal toward Philadelphia	New York Branch	Bethayres toward Bound Brook
Location

Meadowbrook station is a regional rail stop along the SEPTA West Trenton Line. It is located at Mill Road and Lindsay Lane in Abington, Pennsylvania. The station has off-street parking. In FY 2013, Meadowbrook station had a weekday average of 141 boardings and 129 alightings. The station building was destroyed by an early morning fire on April 18, 1995 and was replaced by the bus shelter type of facility that currently serves as the waiting area.

== Station layout ==
Meadowbrook has two low-level side platforms.
