= Lady Washington Inn =

- U.S. National Register of Historic Places
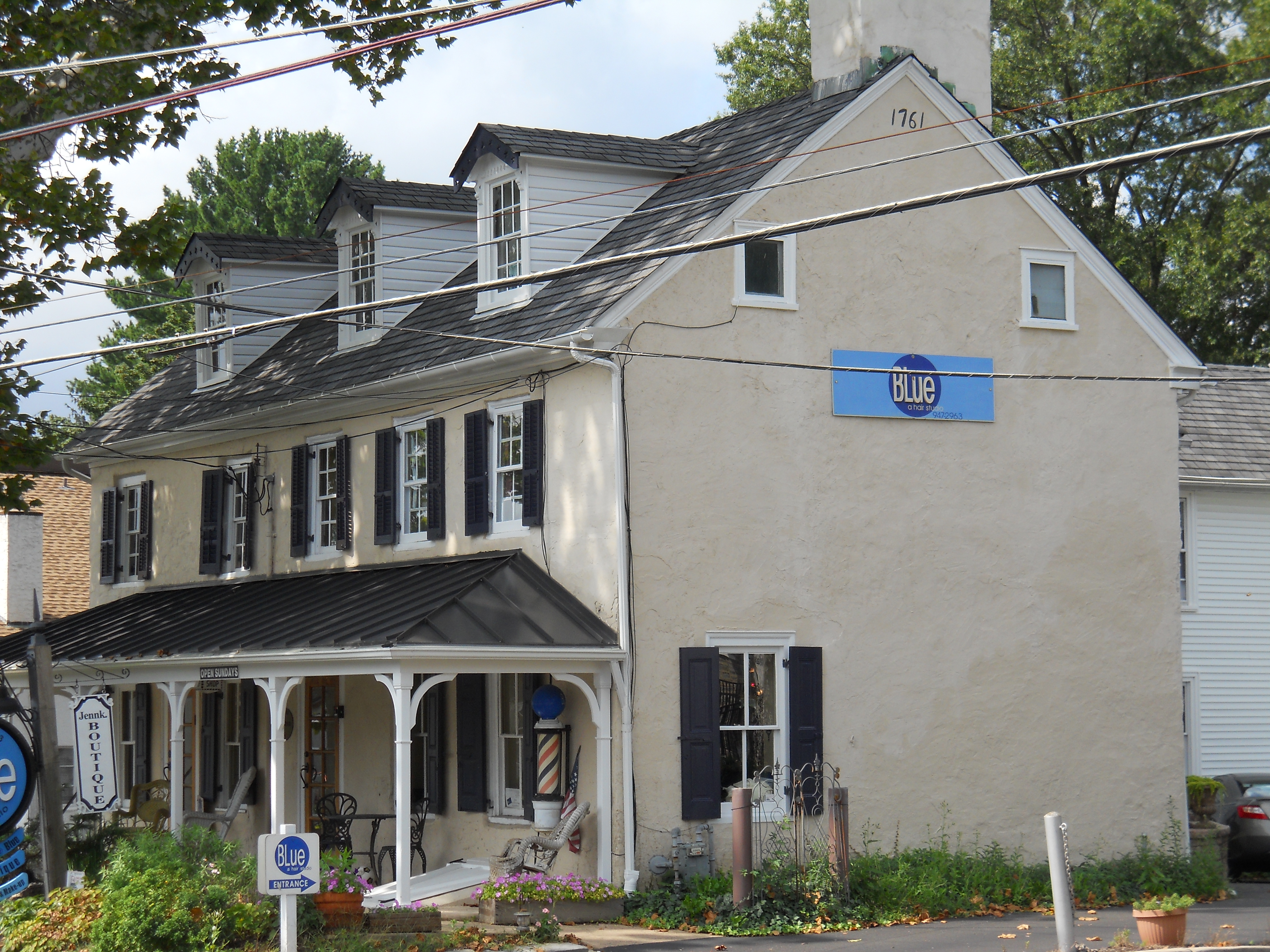
- Lady Washington Inn, September 2012

- Location within Pennsylvania Location within the United States
- Location: 2550 Huntington Pike, Huntingdon Valley, Pennsylvania
- Coordinates: 40°7′28″N 75°3′50″W
- Area: 0.3 acres (0.12 ha)
- Built: 1761, c. 1788-1785, c. 1850-1875
- NRHP reference No.: 82001541
- Added to NRHP: November 26, 1982

Lady Washington Inn is a historic inn and tavern building located at Huntingdon Valley, Montgomery County, Pennsylvania. It was built in three sections in 1761, about 1788–1785, and about 1850–1875. It is a 2 1/2-story, stuccoed stone and frame building with a gable roof and frame rear addition.

It was added to the National Register of Historic Places in 1982.
