= Noble station =

Railway station in Abington, Township, Pennsylvania

Noble
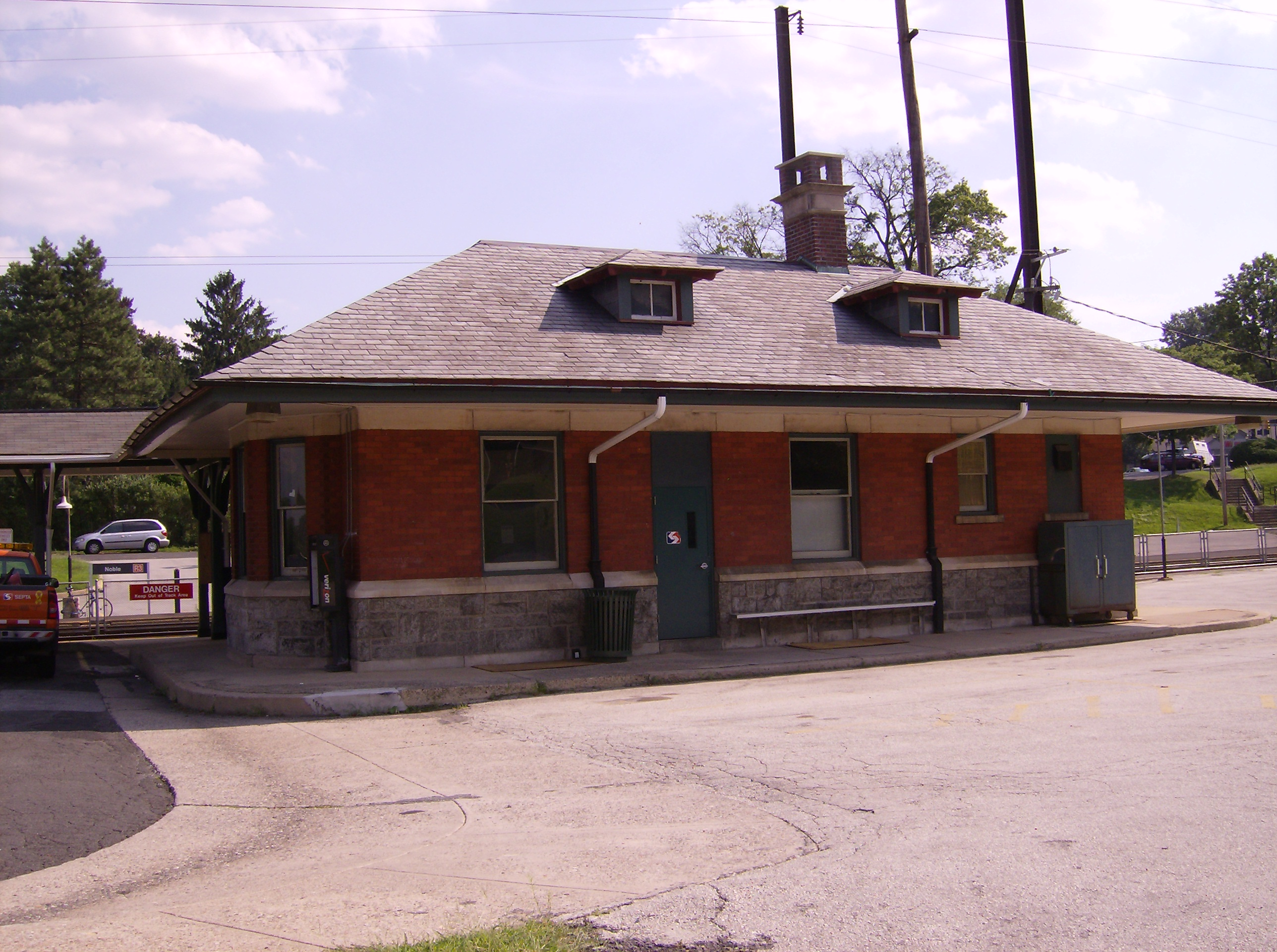
- Noble station from its parking lot.

General information
- Location: Old York Road and Rodman Avenue; Abington Township, Pennsylvania
- Coordinates: 40.1045°N 75.1247°W
- Owner: SEPTA
- Line: Neshaminy Line
- Platforms: 2 side platforms
- Tracks: 2
- Connections: SEPTA City Bus: 55

Construction
- Parking: 61
- Accessible: No

Other information
- Fare zone: 3

History
- Opened: 1889 (NPRR)
- Rebuilt: June–October 1901 (Reading)
- Electrified: July 26, 1931

Services
Preceding station	SEPTA	Following station
Jenkintown–Wyncote toward Penn Medicine Station	West Trenton Line	Rydal toward West Trenton
Former services
Preceding station	Reading Railroad	Following station
Jenkintown toward Philadelphia	New York Branch	Rydal toward Bound Brook
Location

Noble station is a station along the SEPTA West Trenton Line to Ewing, New Jersey. It is located at Old York Road and Rodman Avenue in the community of Noble in Abington Township, Pennsylvania. The station has off-street parking. In FY 2013, Noble station had a weekday average of 222 boardings and 252 alightings.

== History ==
Noble station was originally built in 1901 by the Reading Railroad, as a replacement for a former North Pennsylvania Railroad built in 1889 and dedicated by President Benjamin Harrison. It is the last stop inbound before Jenkintown-Wyncote station in Jenkintown, Pennsylvania, where it merges with the Warminster and Lansdale/Doylestown lines.

== Station layout ==
Noble has two low-level side platforms.

== Gallery ==
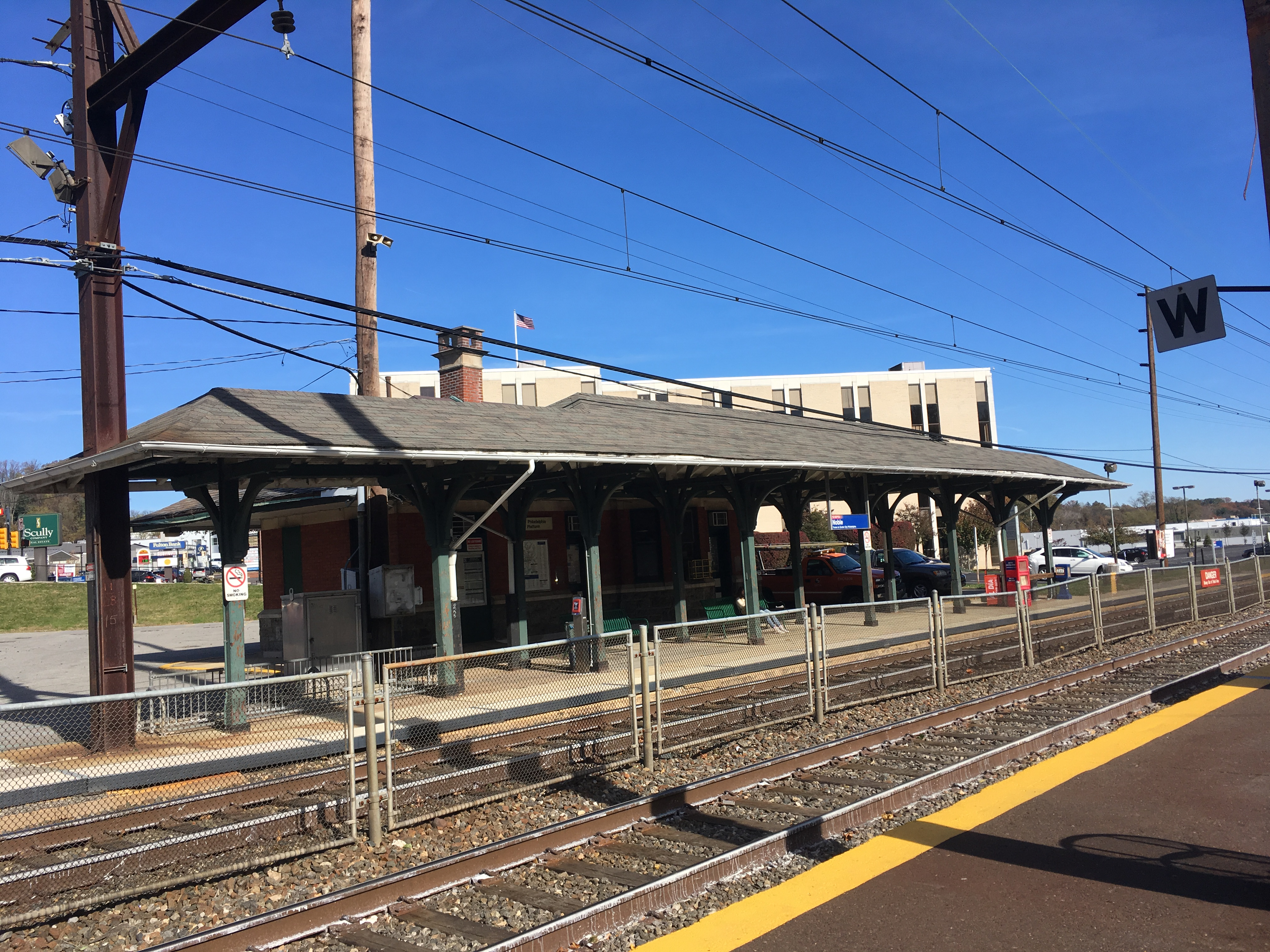
View of Noble station from outbound platform

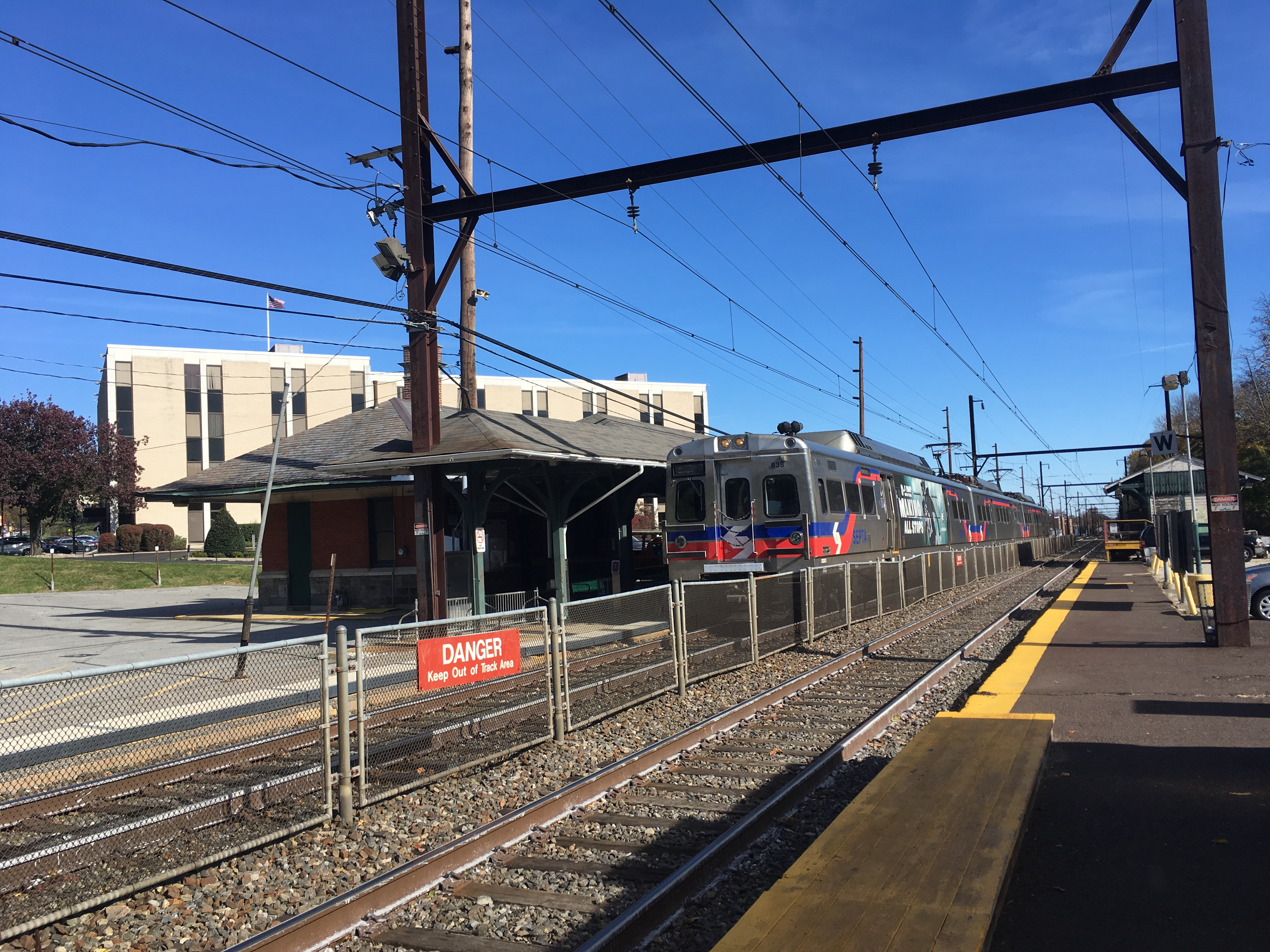
A Center City-bound train stops at Noble station in November 2017
