= Lower Moreland Township, Pennsylvania =

Township in Pennsylvania, US

Lower Moreland Township
- Township
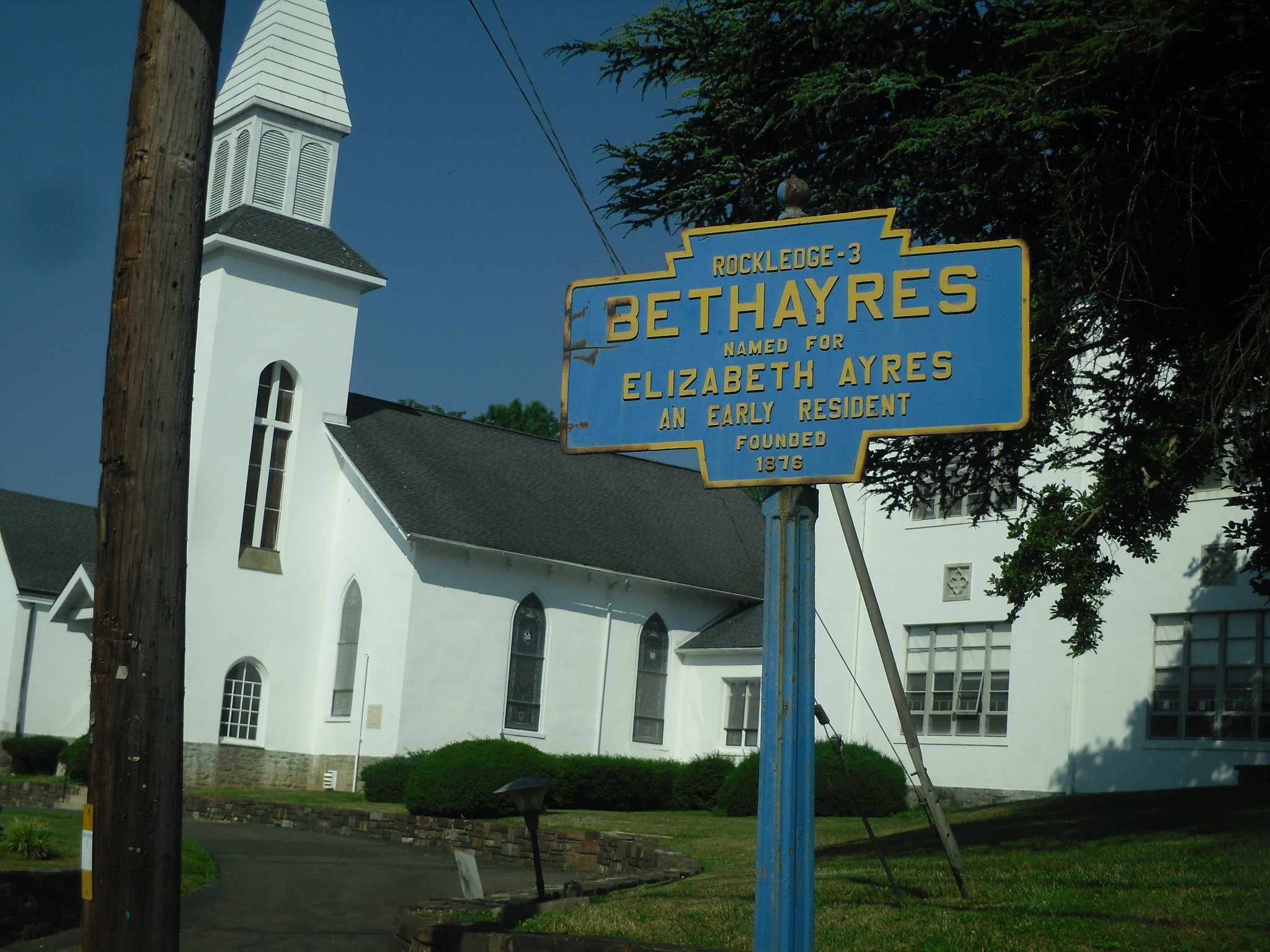
- Keystone marker of Bethayres in front of Huntingdon Valley Presbyterian Church in the township

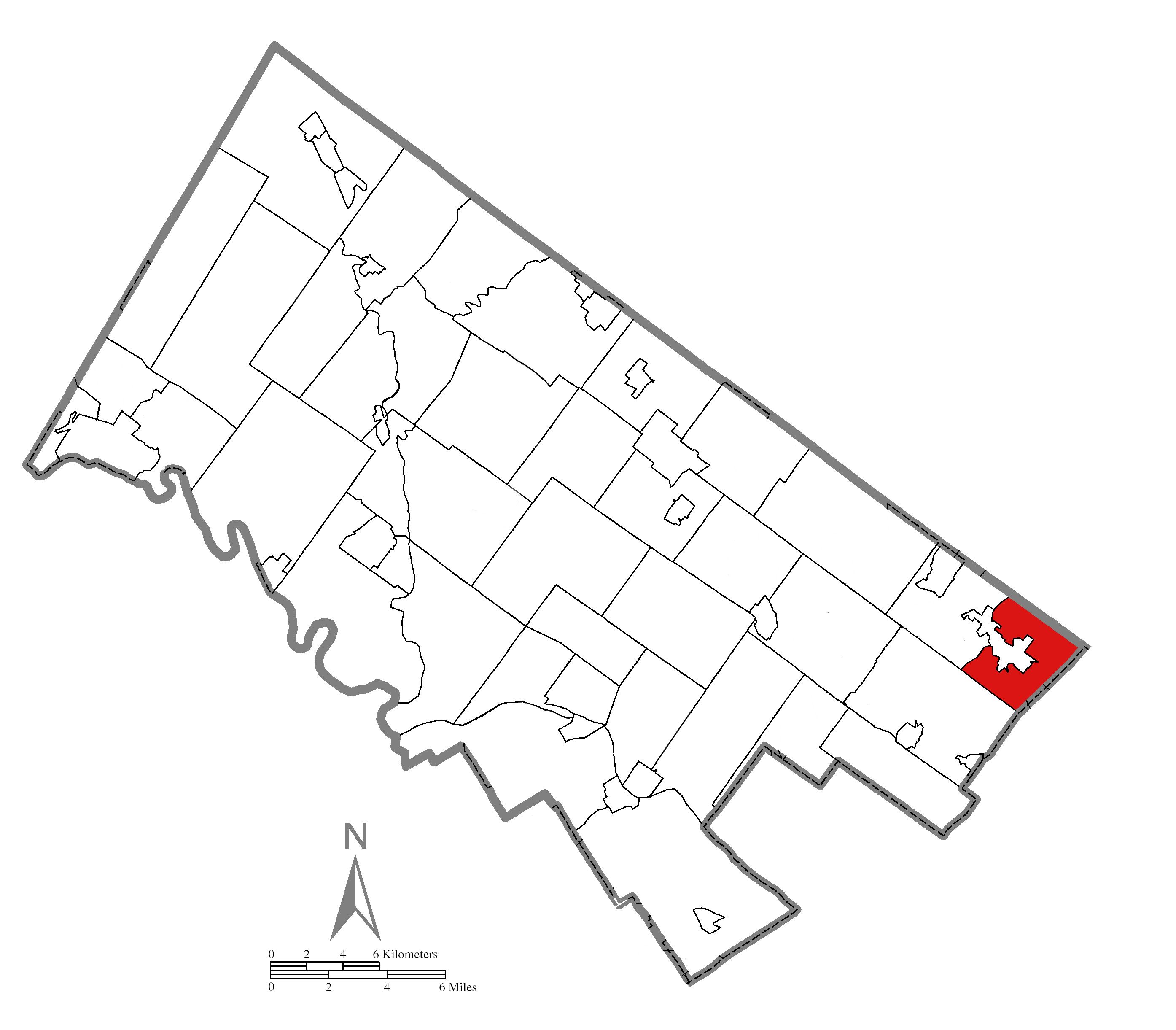
- Location of Lower Moreland Township in Montgomery county, Pennsylvania
- Coordinates: 40°07′00″N 75°02′59″W
- Country: United States
- State: Pennsylvania
- County: Montgomery

Area
  - Total: 7.28 sq mi (18.9 km^{2})
  - Land: 7.28 sq mi (18.9 km^{2})
  - Water: 0.00 sq mi (0 km^{2})
- Elevation: 223 ft (68 m)

Population (2010)
  - Total: 12,982
  - Estimate (2016): 13,213
  - Density: 1,780/sq mi (689/km^{2})
- Time zone: UTC-5 (EST)
  - Summer (DST): UTC-4 (EDT)
- Postal code: 19006
- Area codes: 215, 267 and 445
- FIPS code: 42-091-45008
- Website: www.lowermoreland.org

Lower Moreland Township is a township in Montgomery County, Pennsylvania, United States. The population was 13,917 at the 2020 census.

== History ==
The Bryn Athyn-Lower Moreland Bridge and Fetter's Mill are listed on the National Register of Historic Places.

== Geography ==
According to the United States Census Bureau, the township has a total area of 7.3 square miles (18.9 km^{2}), all land.

== Transportation ==
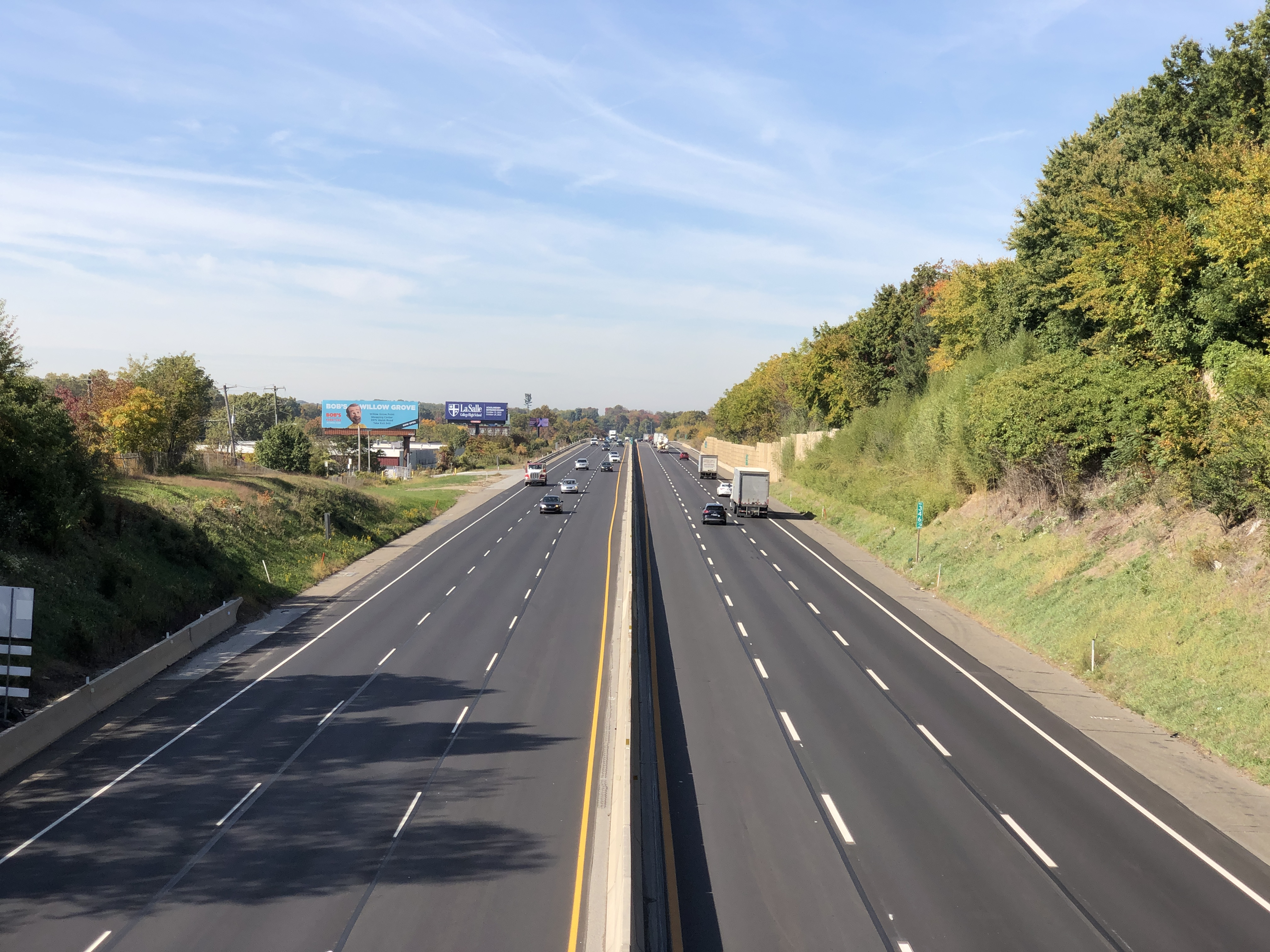
The Pennsylvania Turnpike (I-276) westbound in Lower Moreland Township

As of 2018 there were 77.28 miles (124.37 km) of public roads in Lower Moreland Township, of which 0.40 miles (0.64 km) were maintained by the Pennsylvania Turnpike Commission (PTC), 19.40 miles (31.22 km) were maintained by the Pennsylvania Department of Transportation (PennDOT) and 77.28 miles (124.37 km) were maintained by the township.

The most prominent highway traversing Lower Moreland Township is the Pennsylvania Turnpike (I-276), which clips the northern corner of the township on an east-west alignment. However, the nearest interchange is to the west in neighboring Upper Moreland Township. Local highways serving Lower Moreland include Pennsylvania Route 63, which follows Old Welsh Road and Red Lion Road across the southern portion of the township, and Pennsylvania Route 232, which follows Huntingdon Pike on a south-north route through the center of the township.

SEPTA Regional Rail's West Trenton Line runs through Lower Moreland Township, with stations at Bethayres and Philmont. SEPTA provides City Bus service to Lower Moreland Township along Route 24, which follows Huntingdon Pike along its route between the Frankford Transportation Center in Northeast Philadelphia and Southampton, and Route 88, which serves Bethayres along its route between Holy Redeemer Hospital and the Frankford Transportation Center.

== Demographics ==
Historical population
Census	Pop.	Note	%±
1930	1,300		—
1940	1,451		11.6%
1950	2,245		54.7%
1960	5,731		155.3%
1970	11,665		103.5%
1980	12,472		6.9%
1990	11,768		−5.6%
2000	11,281		−4.1%
2010	12,982		15.1%
2020	13,917		7.2%

As of the 2010 census, the township was 88.2% White, 1.0% Black or African American, 0.1% Native American, 8.9% Asian, 0.1% Native Hawaiian, and 1.2% were two or more races. 1.8% of the population were of Hispanic or Latino ancestry.

As of the census of 2000, there were 11,281 people, 4,112 households, and 3,330 families residing in the township. The population density was 1,548.3 inhabitants per square mile (597.8/km^{2}). There were 4,209 housing units at an average density of 577.7 per square mile (223.1/km^{2}). The racial makeup of the township was 95.36% White, 0.53% African American, 0.05% Native American, 3.37% Asian, 0.20% from other races, and 0.50% from two or more races. Hispanic or Latino of any race were 0.91% of the population. The area is home to a significant and fast-growing foreign-born population, with large concentrations of Russian, Indian, and Korean immigrants.

There were 4,112 households, out of which 31.4% had children under the age of 18 living with them, 73.1% were married couples living together, 5.6% had a female householder with no husband present, and 19.0% were non-families. 17.4% of all households were made up of individuals, and 11.5% had someone living alone who was 65 years of age or older. The average household size was 2.71 and the average family size was 3.07.

In the township the population was spread out, with 22.3% under the age of 18, 5.8% from 18 to 24, 20.9% from 25 to 44, 30.7% from 45 to 64, and 20.4% who were 65 years of age or older. The median age was 46 years. For every 100 females, there were 93.9 males. For every 100 females age 18 and over, there were 90.6 males.

The median income for a household in the township was $82,597, and the median income for a family was $98,656. Males had a median income of $69,173 versus $37,902 for females. The per capita income for the township was $40,129. About 1.1% of families and 2.1% of the population were below the poverty line, including 1.4% of those under age 18 and 3.0% of those age 65 or over.

== Government and politics ==
Lower Moreland is something of an anti-bellwether town, voting for the losing candidate in every presidential election from 1992 up to and including 2016. Before voting for Joe Biden in 2020, it last voted for a winning presidential candidate in 1988.

Presidential elections results
Year	Republican	Democratic
2020	48.4% 4,304	50.4% 4,480
2016	46.7% 3,561	49.5% 3,773
2012	53.5% 3,813	45.6% 3,249
2008	49.6% 3,612	49.6% 3,608
2004	47.7% 3,402	51.9% 3,701
2000	43.6% 2,821	54.1% 3,504
1996	46.8% 2,809	45.1% 2,710
1992	45.9% 3,052	39.2% 2,603

== Notable people ==
- Harry Elfont, screenwriter and director
- Marvin Harrison, former professional football player, Indianapolis Colts
- Valerie Plame, CIA agent and wife of Joseph Wilson who was outed as a CIA agent in 2003
- Rod Rosenstein, former Deputy Attorney General of the United States
- Lawrence Saint, stained-glass artist
- Nancy Spungen, girlfriend of punk rock musician Sid Vicious who was murdered in 1978 at age 20 at the Hotel Chelsea

== See also ==
- Huntingdon Valley, Pennsylvania

Preceded by Abington Township	Bordering communities of Philadelphia	Succeeded by Lower Southampton Township; Bucks County
