= Fetter's Mill Village Historic District =

Historic district in Pennsylvania, United States

- U.S. National Register of Historic Places
- U.S. Historic district
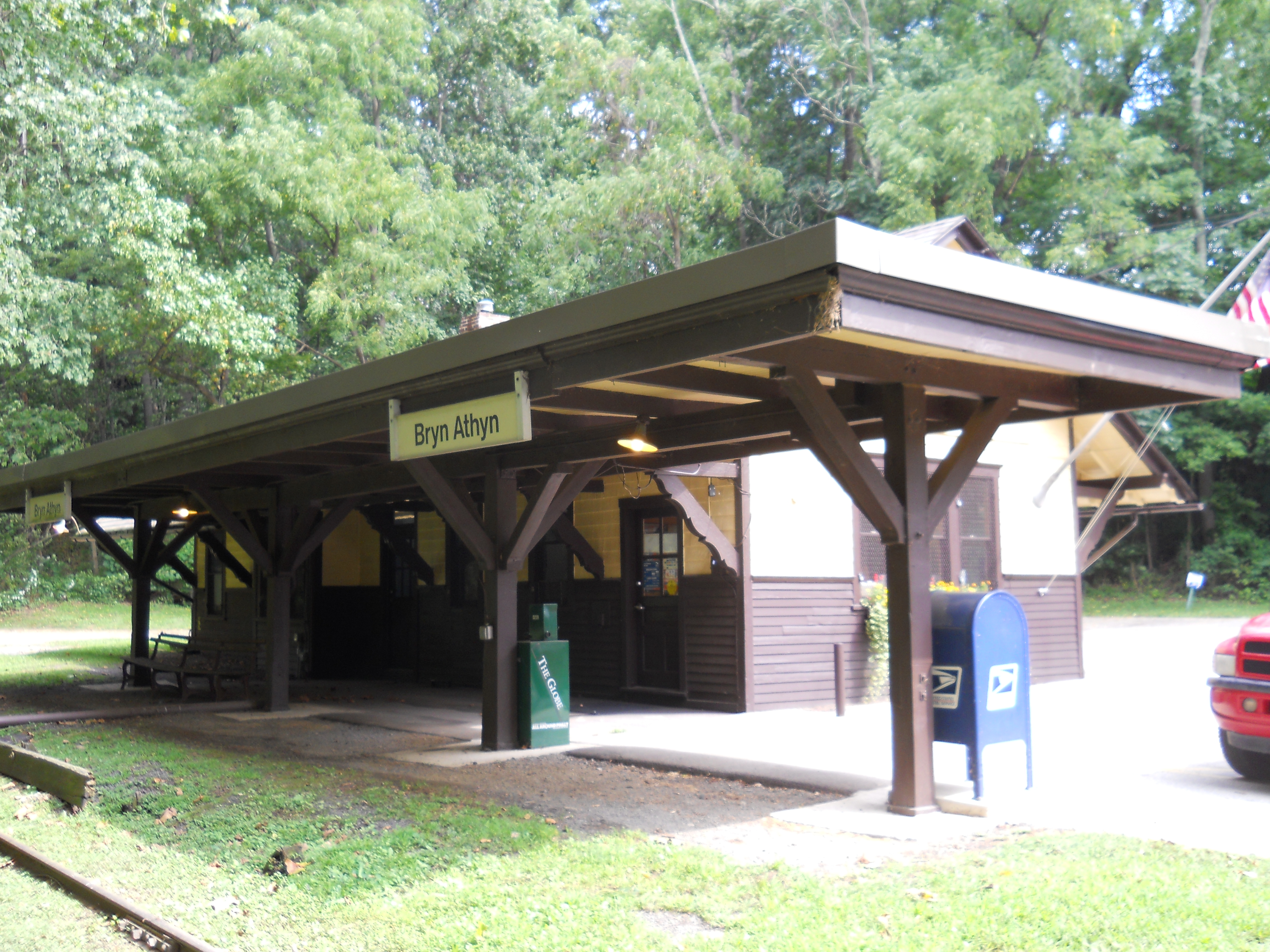
- Historic Bryn Athyn Train Station and Post Office (1902), September 2012

- Location within Pennsylvania Location within the United States
- Location: Fetter's Mill Rd. and Pennypack Ln., Bryn Athyn and Lower Moreland Township, Pennsylvania
- Coordinates: 40°7′55″N 75°4′18″W
- Area: 7 acres (2.8 ha)
- Built: c. 1740
- Architectural style: Georgian, Colonial
- NRHP reference No.: 05001212
- Added to NRHP: August 16, 2006

Fetter's Mill Village Historic District is a national historic district located in Bryn Athyn and Lower Moreland Township, Montgomery County, Pennsylvania. It encompasses five contributing buildings and three contributing structures. They are a wagon shed / John Conner studio (1751), Alnwick Grove Train Station (c. 1870), Bryn Athyn Train Station / Post Office (1902), farmhouse (c. 1790), stone barn, two iron bridges (1883, 1916-1917), and a milk platform (c. 1900). Located in the district is the separately listed Fetter's Mill, built about 1740.

The area inspired parishioners of The New Church in Philadelphia to migrate to the countryside in order establish and practice as a religious community. They began coming to the area for church excursions or picnics to Alnwick Grove, a park served by the Alnwick Grove Station (Now a private residence, on the Lower Moreland side of the train tracks). After visiting the area, wealthy church member, John Pitcairn, Jr bought the first plots of land, then known as Knights Farm. This area is now the site of Bryn Athyn Cathedral, Cairnwood, Cairncrest, and Glencairn (the latter three all Pitcairn family estates).

It was added to the National Register of Historic Places in 2006.
