= Bethayres station =

Railway station in Bethayres, Pennsylvania

Bethayres
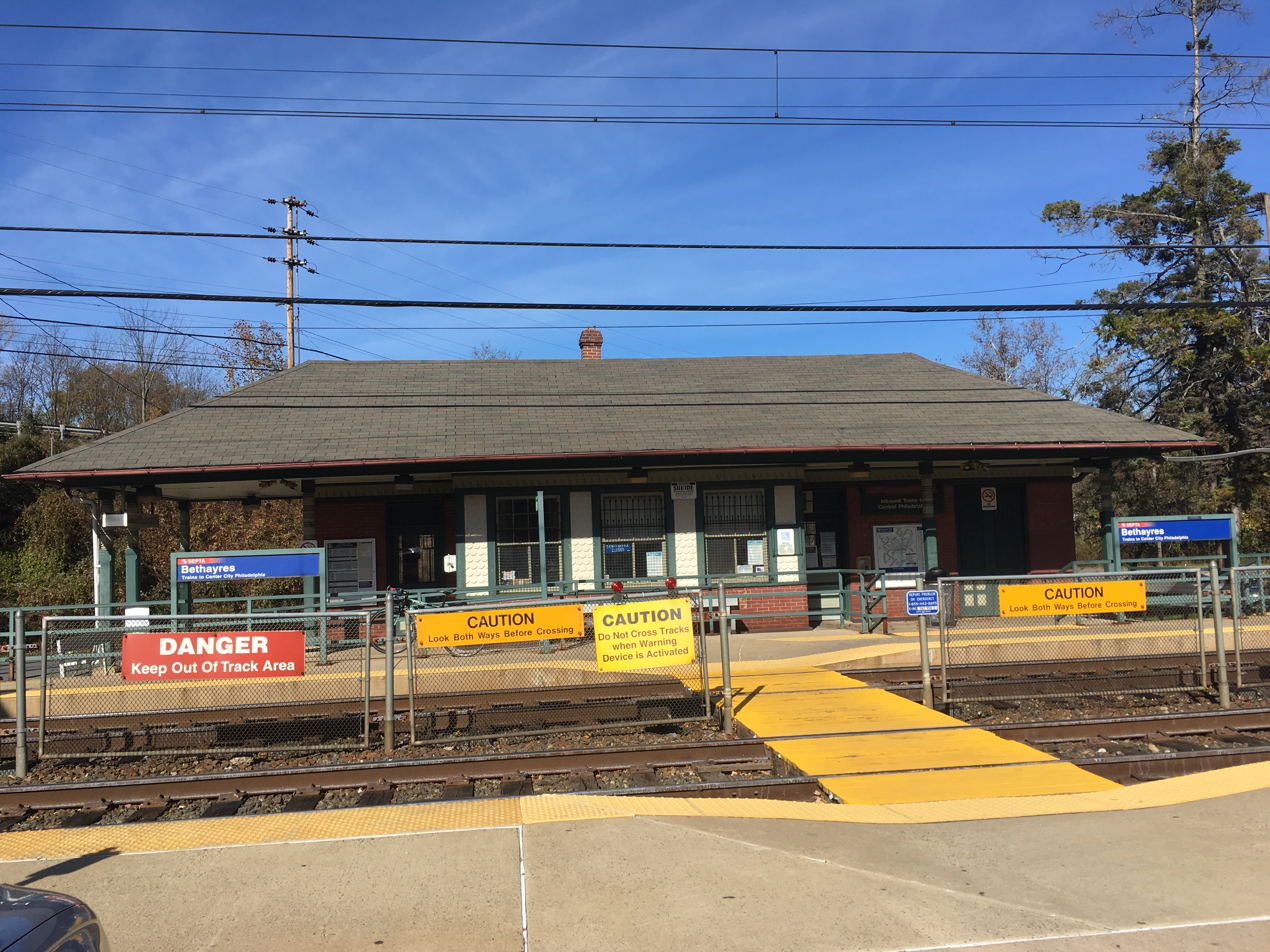

General information
- Location: 2213 Huntingdon Pike; Bethayres, Pennsylvania 19006
- Coordinates: 40.1166°N 75.0687°W
- Owner: SEPTA
- Line: Neshaminy Line
- Platforms: 2 side platforms
- Tracks: 2
- Connections: SEPTA City Bus: 24, 88

Construction
- Parking: 333 spaces (93 with Permit)
- Accessible: Yes

Other information
- Fare zone: 3

History
- Electrified: July 26, 1931

Passengers
- 2017: 636 boardings 630 alightings (weekday average)
- Rank: 35 of 146

Services
Preceding station	SEPTA	Following station
Meadowbrook toward Penn Medicine Station	West Trenton Line	Philmont toward West Trenton
Former services
Preceding station	Reading Railroad	Following station
Meadowbrook toward Philadelphia	New York Branch	Philmont toward Bound Brook
Location

Bethayres station is a SEPTA Regional Rail station in Bethayres, Pennsylvania. It is located at Station Avenue and Old Welsh Road and serves the West Trenton Line to Ewing, New Jersey. Bethayres station was originally built in 1876 by the Reading Railroad. The station has off-street parking and a ticket office. There is also a handicapped-accessible platform. In FY 2013, Bethyares station had a weekday average of 578 boardings and 553 alightings. Before the COVID-19 pandemic, Bethayres was the last boarding stop for AM peak service express trains to Philadelphia and the first discharge stop for PM peak service express trains from Philadelphia.

== Station layout ==
Bethayres has two low-level side platforms with a mini high-level platform.
