= Langhorne station =

Railway station in Langhorne Manor, Pennsylvania

Langhorne
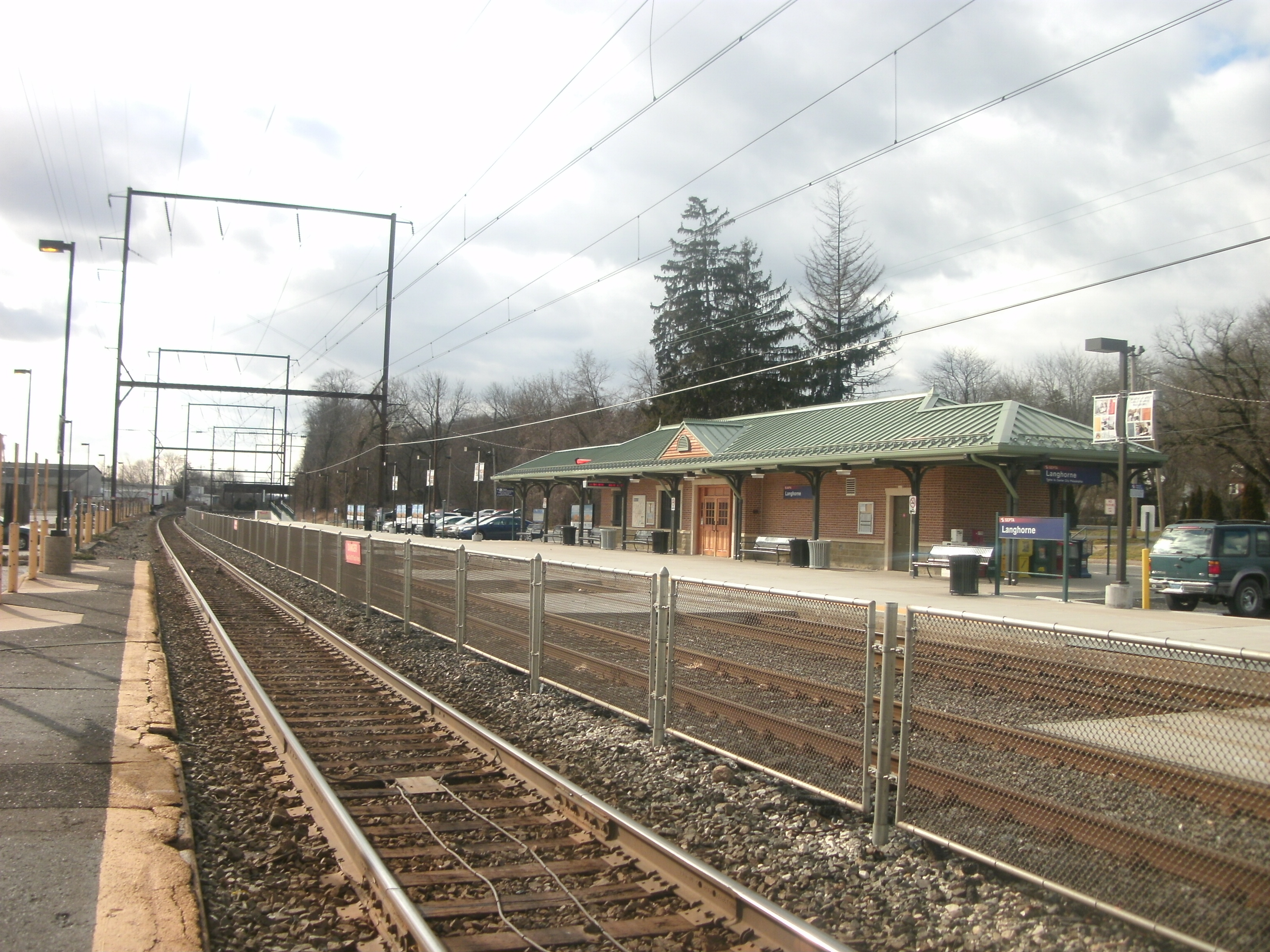
- The station at Langhorne in February 2012 from the abandoned outbound platform. The new station depot, constructed in 2010, is visible on the inbound platform.

General information
- Location: Bellevue (PA 413) and Comly Avenues; Langhorne Manor, Pennsylvania (Langhorne address), 19047
- Coordinates: 40.1608°N 74.9131°W
- Owner: SEPTA
- Line: Neshaminy Line
- Platforms: 1 side platform
- Tracks: 1
- Connections: SEPTA City Bus: 14; SEPTA Suburban Bus: 130

Construction
- Parking: 339 paid
- Cycle facilities: 3 racks
- Accessible: No

Other information
- Fare zone: 4

History
- Opened: April 27, 1876 (ceremonial service); May 1, 1876 (regular service)
- Rebuilt: 1881; 2010
- Electrified: July 26, 1931

Key dates
- September 20, 2024: Station agent eliminated

Passengers
- 2017: 404 boardings 426 alightings (weekday average)
- Rank: 65 of 146

Services
Preceding station	SEPTA	Following station
Neshaminy Falls toward Penn Medicine Station	West Trenton Line	Woodbourne toward West Trenton
Former services
Preceding station	Reading Railroad	Following station
Parkland toward Philadelphia	New York Branch	Glenlake toward Bound Brook
Location

Langhorne station is a station along the SEPTA West Trenton Line to Ewing, New Jersey, United States. It is located at Bellevue (PA 413) and Comly Avenues in Langhorne Manor, Pennsylvania.

The station has 339 off-street parking spots and 3 bicycle racks. In FY 2013, Langhorne station had a weekday average of 643 boardings and 688 alightings.

Langhorne station was originally built by the Reading Railroad in 1881. On May 29, 2009, SEPTA announced a $2.3 million plan to replace the existing station. On April 6, 2010, the original station was demolished in order to make room for its replacement. SEPTA eliminated the station agent on September 20, 2024.

It is near the borough limits of Penndel.

== Station layout ==
Langhorne consists of a single low-level side platform adjacent to the inbound track. Access to the outbound track is via concrete crossovers of the inbound track.

== Gallery ==
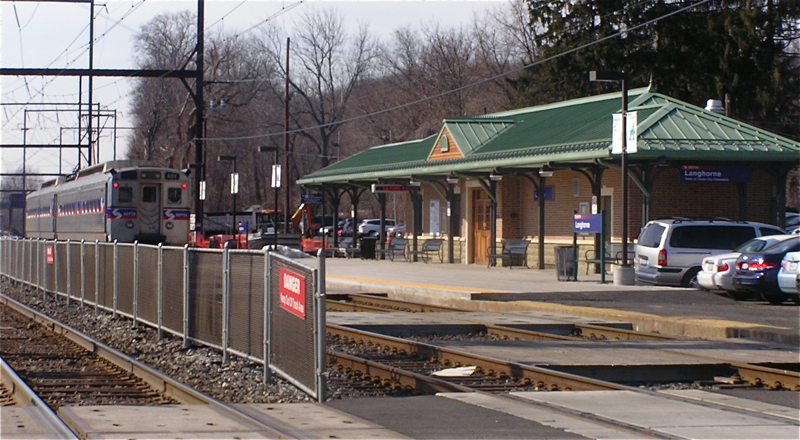
Train at Langhorne station in February 2011

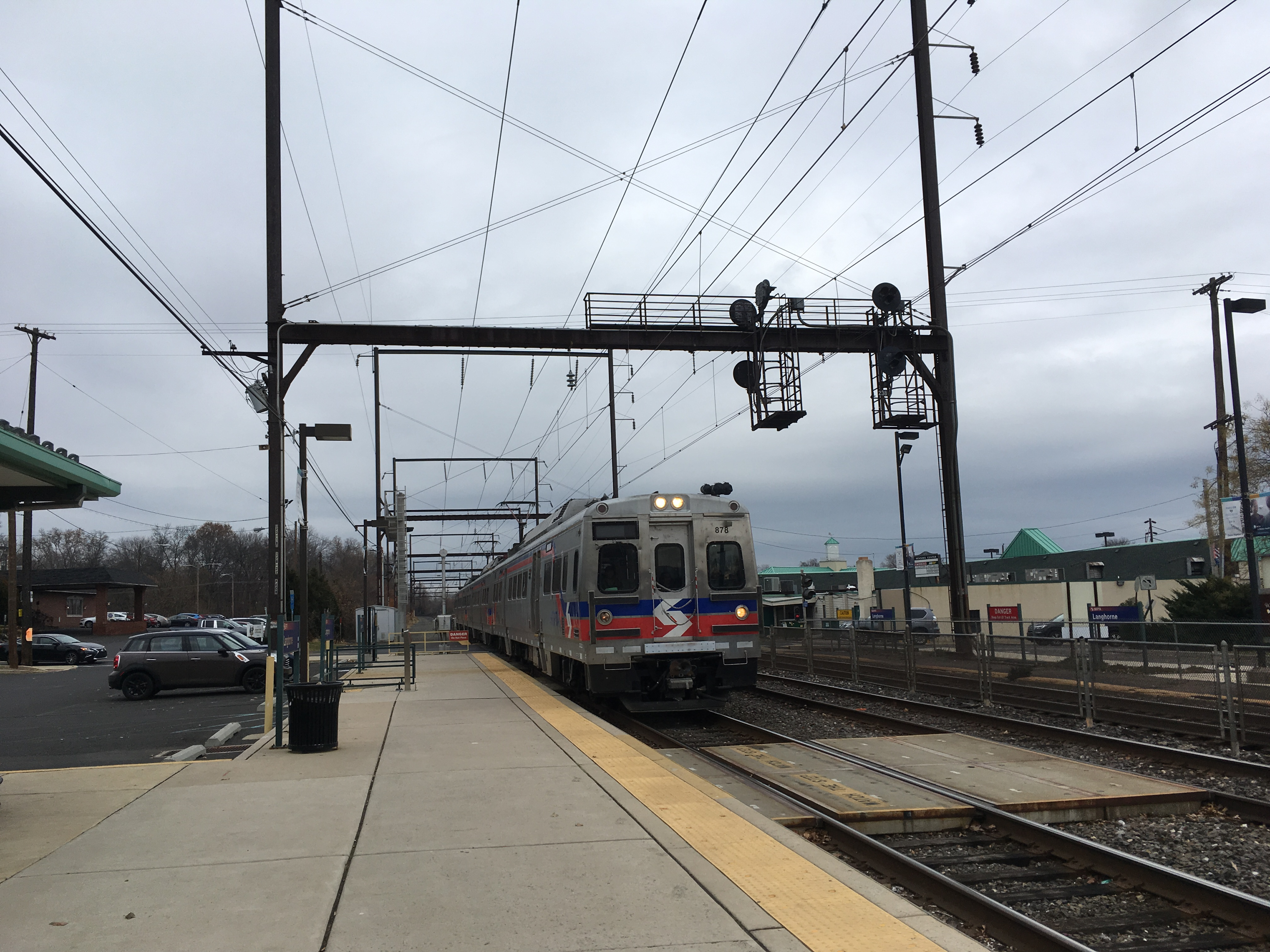
A Center City-bound train stops at Langhorne station in December 2017

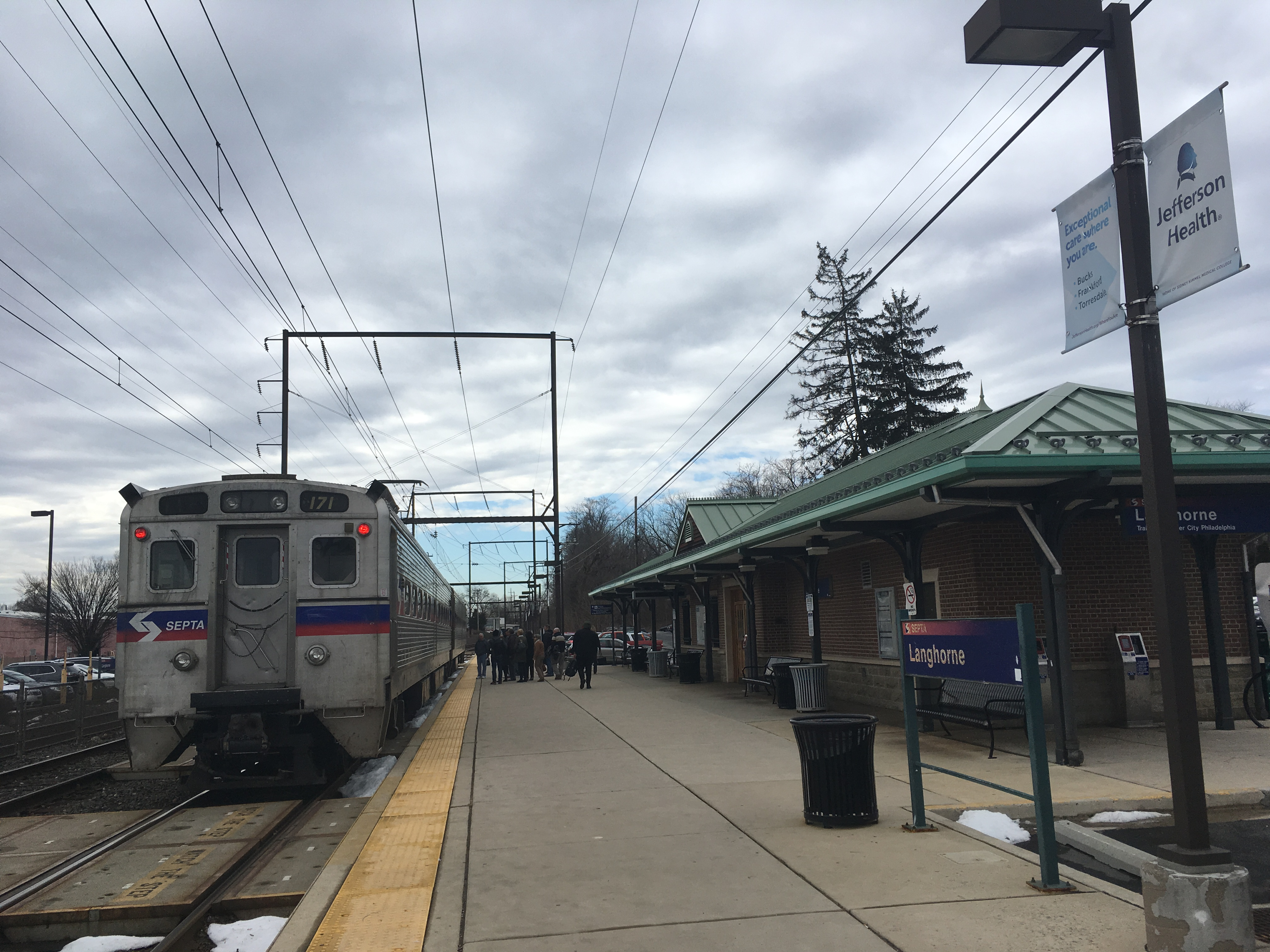
A Center City-bound train stops at Langhorne station in February 2019

== Bibliography ==
- Poor, Henry Varnum (1865). Manual of the Railroads of the United States: Volume 27. H.V. & H.W. Poor.
