= Neshaminy Line =

Railway line in Pennsylvania and New Jersey

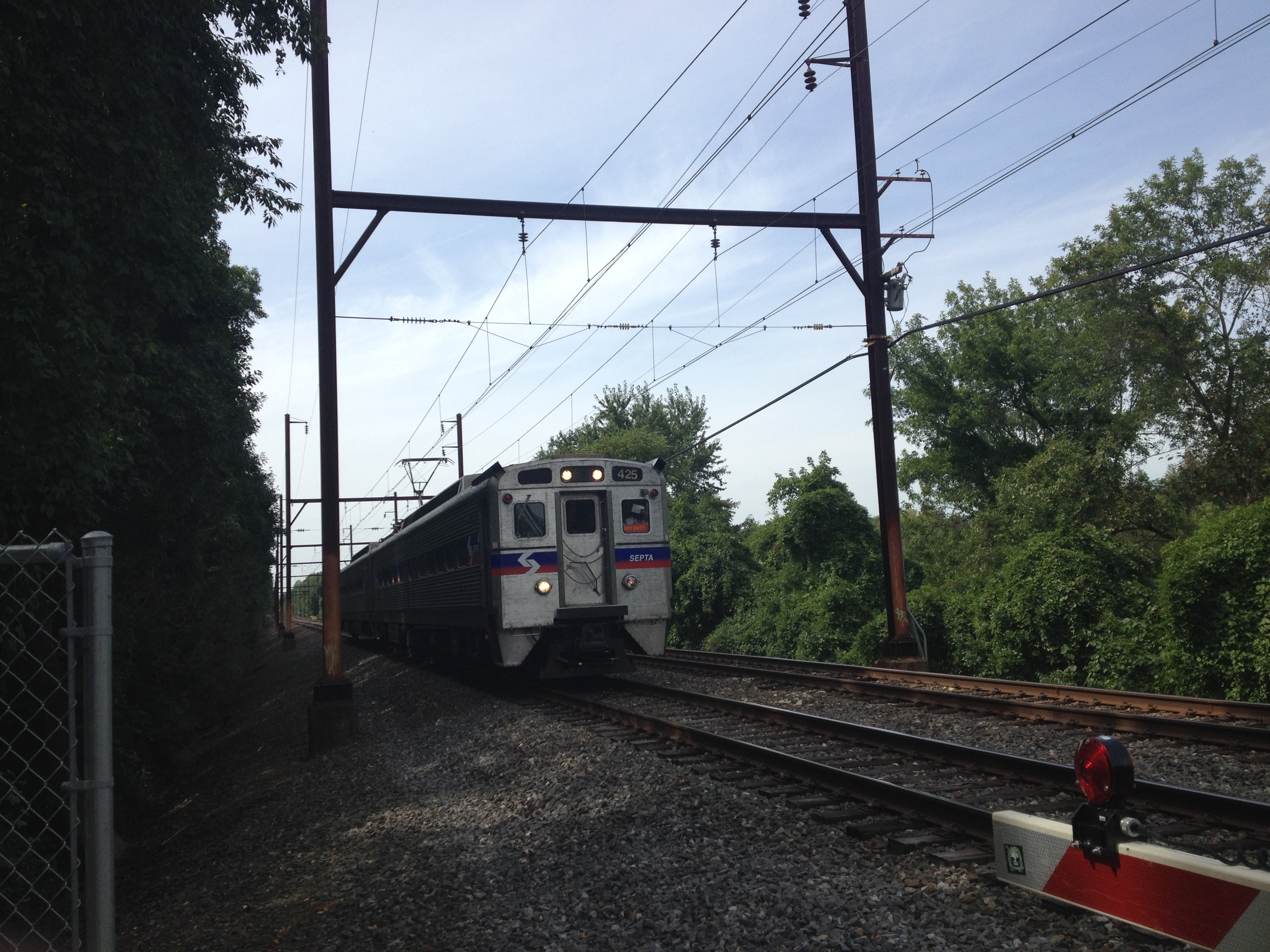
- Outbound West Trenton Line train on the Neshaminy Line between the Meadowbrook and Bethayres stations

Overview
- Owner: SEPTA

Service
- Services: West Trenton Line

History
- Opened: 1 May 1876 (New York Branch)

Technical
- Line length: 21.7 mi (34.9 km)
- Track gauge: 1,435 mm (4 ft 8 1/2 in) standard gauge
- Electrification: 12 kV 25 Hz overhead catenary

The Neshaminy Line is a railway line in the states of Pennsylvania and New Jersey. It runs 21.7 miles (34.9 km) from a junction with the SEPTA Main Line just north of Jenkintown–Wyncote to West Trenton, just across the Delaware River. It was originally built in 1876 as part of the much longer New York Branch, which continued north to Bound Brook, New Jersey. The electrified section between Jenkin and West Trenton was designated the Neshaminy Line and is now owned by SEPTA. It hosts the West Trenton Line commuter rail service. The freight-only Trenton Subdivision runs parallel between Neshaminy Falls and West Trenton.

== History ==
The North Pennsylvania Railroad and the Delaware and Bound Brook Railroad built the New York Branch to create an alternative route between Philadelphia and New York City, competing with the Pennsylvania Railroad. The line opened on May 1, 1876. The Philadelphia and Reading Railroad, forerunner of the Reading Company, leased the Delaware and Bound Brook Railroad and North Pennsylvania Railroad on May 14, 1879. The Reading electrified the New York Branch between Jenkintown and West Trenton in 1931; electric trains began operating from the Reading Terminal on July 26, 1931.

With the Reading's final bankruptcy and the creation of Conrail in 1976, the line was split. The electrified line between Jenkin and West Trenton was conveyed to SEPTA and designated the Neshaminy Line. Conrail's Trenton Line ran from Port Reading Junction to a junction with the Philadelphia Subdivision in Philadelphia proper. This new subdivision included the New York Branch between the northern end at Port Reading Junction and West Trenton, shared operation with SEPTA between West Trenton and Woodbourne, a single parallel track between Woodbourne and Neshaminy Falls, and then three other former Reading lines: the New York Short Line, the Low Grade Branch, and the Richmond Branch. Diesel service north of West Trenton ended on August 1, 1981.

The Conrail split in 1999 saw the Trenton Line pass to CSX Transportation, which renamed it the Trenton Subdivision. Growing congestion and the need to implement positive train control (PTC) led to SEPTA and CSX undertaking the West Trenton Separation Project in 2015. This project built a new third track between Woodbourne and Yardley, fully separating the Neshaminy Line and the Trenton Subdivision. SEPTA activated PTC on the West Trenton Line on October 24, 2016.
