= Woodbourne station =

Railway station in Middletown, Pennsylvania

Woodbourne
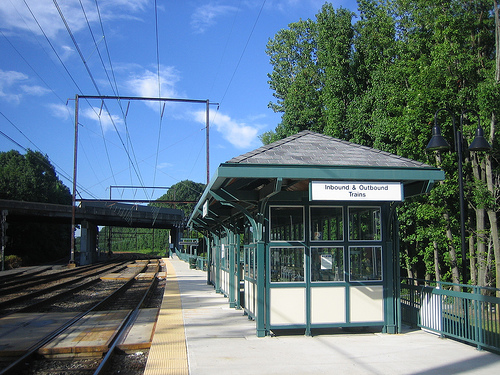
- Woodbourne station in August 2006

General information
- Location: Woodbourne Road; Middletown Township, Pennsylvania
- Coordinates: 40.1909°N 74.8910°W
- Owner: SEPTA
- Line: Neshaminy Line
- Platforms: 1 side platform
- Tracks: 3 (two in use by SEPTA)
- Connections: Newtown RUSH Buses

Construction
- Parking: 558
- Cycle facilities: 6
- Accessible: No (Accessible boarding on the inbound track only)

Other information
- Fare zone: 4

History
- Rebuilt: 2002
- Electrified: July 26, 1931

Passengers
- 2017: 592 boardings 558 alightings (weekday average)
- Rank: 40 of 146

Services
Preceding station	SEPTA	Following station
Langhorne toward Penn Medicine Station	West Trenton Line	Yardley toward West Trenton
Former services
Preceding station	Reading Railroad	Following station
Glenlake toward Philadelphia	New York Branch	Roelofs toward Bound Brook
Location

Woodbourne station is a train station located on Woodbourne Road in Middletown Township, Pennsylvania along the SEPTA West Trenton Line which terminates at West Trenton station in Ewing, New Jersey, and also on the CSX Trenton Subdivision which has a freight yard not far by the station.

In FY 2013, Woodbourne station had a weekday average of 702 boardings and 661 alightings.

== Reconstruction project ==
Woodbourne station as it is known today is the result of two year, two phase, $2,069,344 project undertaken in 2000 by SEPTA known as the "Woodbourne Reconstruction and Parking Expansion Project".

=== Phase I ===
Phase I of this project provided for improvements to SEPTA's Woodbourne station parking lot on the West Trenton Regional Rail Line.

The scope of work included the paving of the existing 79-space gravel lot and the expansion of this lot to accommodate an additional 58 parking spaces. Also included in the first phase was the purchase of the newly constructed 380-space parking facility built to SEPTA's specifications. The builder and property owner, McGrath Homes, was willing to enter into the transaction with SEPTA to complement their residential construction adjacent to the site. Phase I was completed in October 2000.

=== Phase II ===
Phase II of this project, completed in November 2002, consisted of the construction of new station facilities on the other side of Woodbourne Road, adjacent to the new parking lot. The new low-level platform accommodates a six-car train; a large canopy/shelter is located near its center. New gooseneck-style lighting fixtures were installed throughout the station area.

Accessibility features include new tactile edging, a mini-high level platform, signage, and an AVPA system. Due to the configuration of this three-track territory (two passenger tracks and one freight track), cross track boarding platforms were installed in order to reach the center (outbound) passenger track. As the mini-high level platform only allows accessible boarding from the inbound track, the station is not considered accessible by SEPTA. The location of the old station has since become a popular location for local railfans to watch and film trains from.

== Station layout ==
Woodbourne consists of a single low-level side platform adjacent to the inbound track. Access to the outbound track is via concrete crossovers of the inbound track.

== Gallery ==
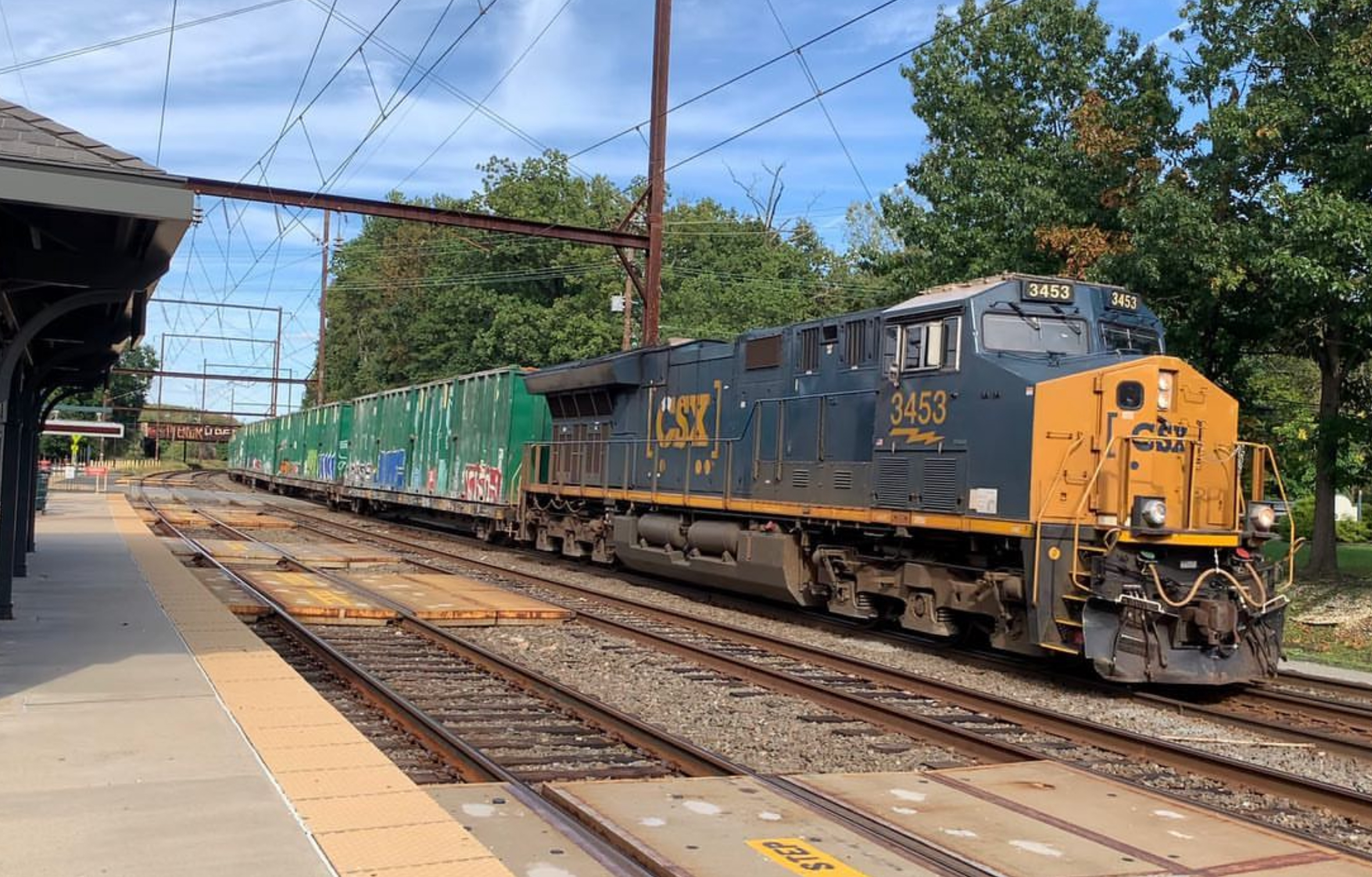
CSX Transportation GE-ET44AH number 3453 with a southwestern bound manifest train passing by Woodbourne station

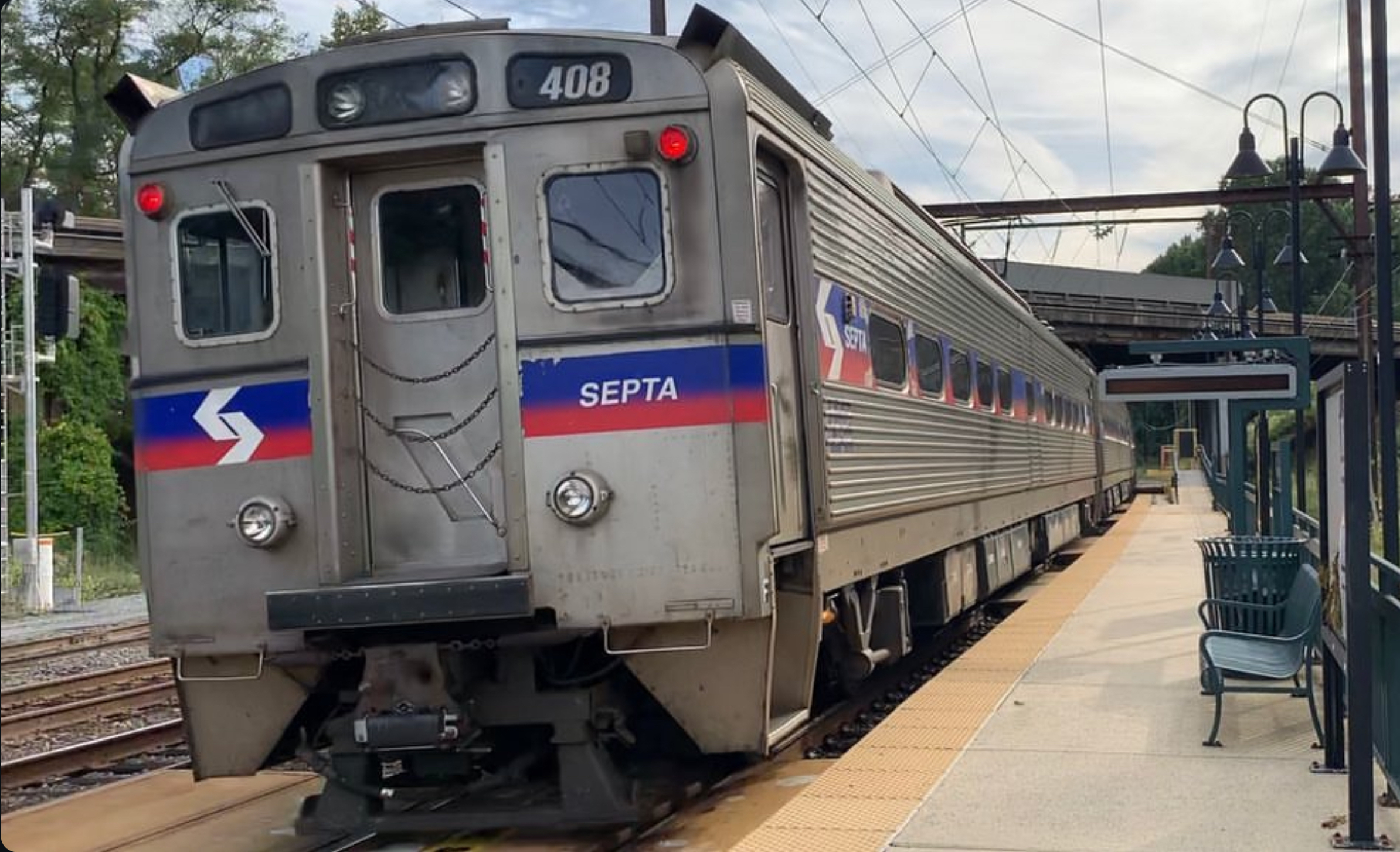
SEPTA Silverliner-IV number 408 with a center city bound train departing from Woodbourne station
