= West Trenton Line =

SEPTA Regional Rail service

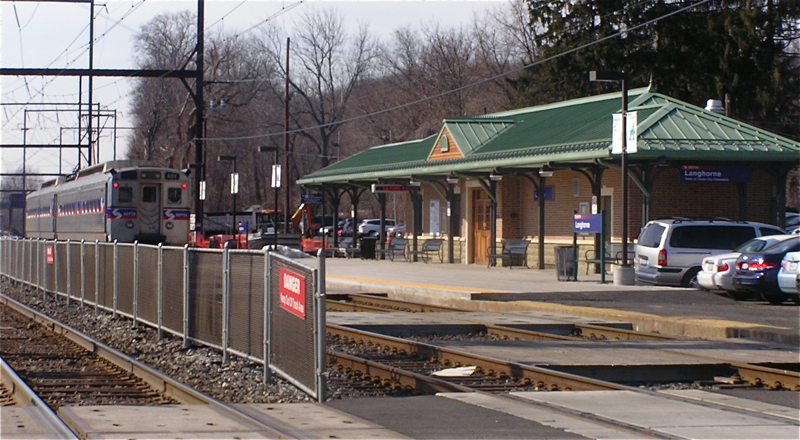
- Langhorne station on the West Trenton Line

Overview
- Service type: SEPTA Regional Rail commuter service
- Current operator: SEPTA
- Daily ridership: 7,330 (FY 2025)

Route
- Termini: Penn Medicine Station; 30th Street Station (weekends and major holidays); West Trenton
- Stops: 22
- Lines used: Neshaminy Line; SEPTA Main Line; West Chester Branch

Technical
- Rolling stock: Electric multiple units
- Electrification: Overhead line, 12 kV 25 Hz AC

The West Trenton Line is a SEPTA Regional Rail service connecting Center City Philadelphia to the West Trenton section of Ewing Township, New Jersey.

== Route ==
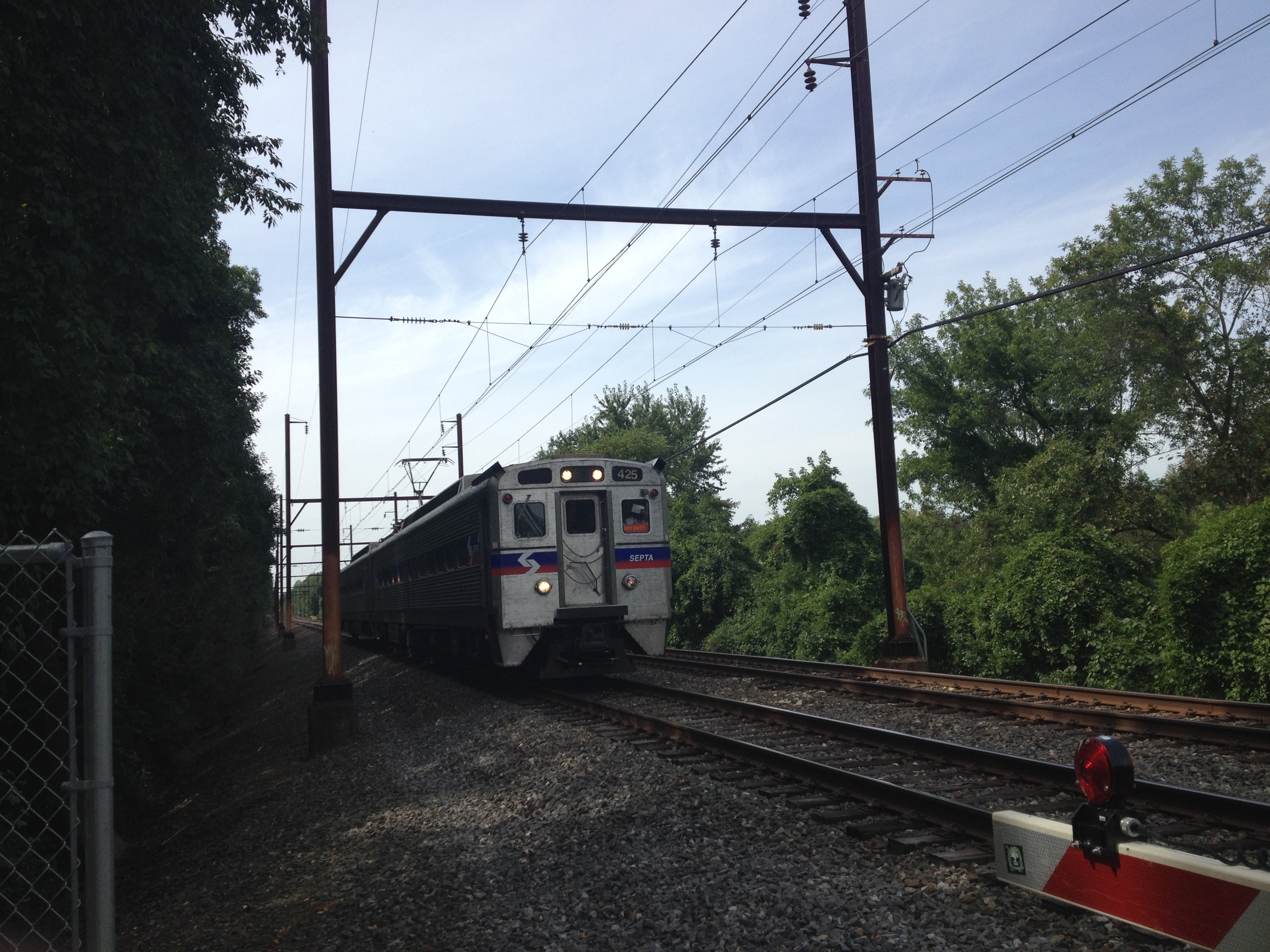
Outbound train on the West Trenton Line between the Meadowbrook and Bethayres stations

The West Trenton Line connects Center City Philadelphia with the West Trenton section of Ewing, New Jersey. The line splits from the SEPTA Main Line at Jenkintown, running northeast on the Neshaminy Line. At Bethayres, it crosses the Pennypack Trail that runs along the former Philadelphia, Newtown and New York Railroad, which once connected with the Fox Chase Line. At Oakford, the former New York Short Line Railroad, once part of the Reading's main line to West Trenton and Jersey City and currently CSX's Trenton Subdivision, merges. North of Oakford, the West Trenton Line runs parallel to CSX's Trenton Subdivision. The West Trenton Railroad Bridge, a concrete arch bridge, crosses the Delaware River to the final stop at West Trenton.

== History ==
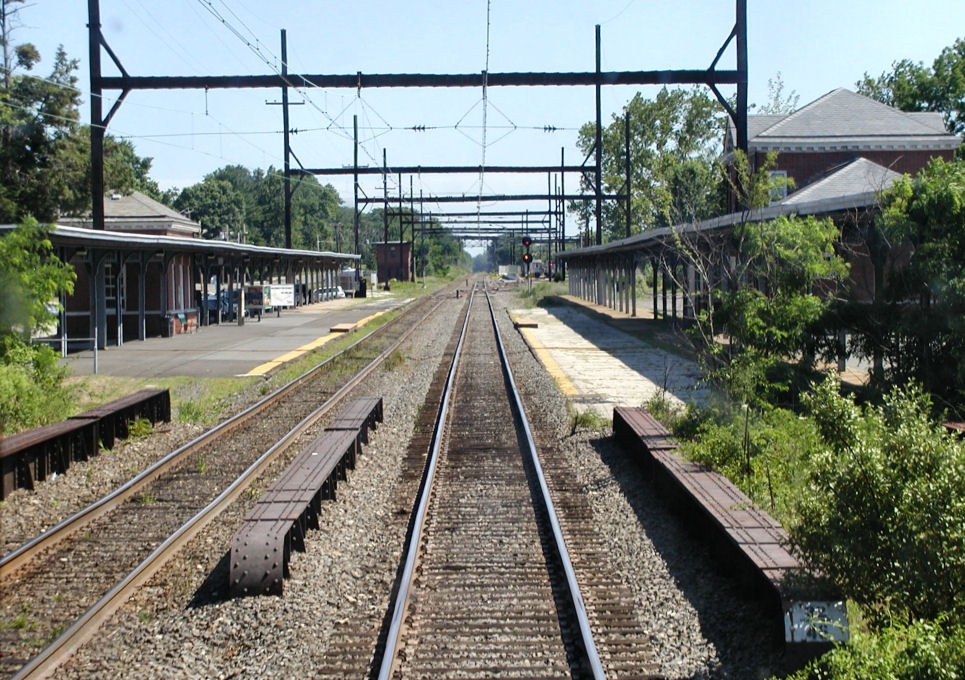
West Trenton station

Like all of the Reading Company's commuter lines, the West Trenton Line was electrified in the early 1930s and has a mix of at-grade and grade separated crossings. Electrified service to West Trenton was opened on July 26, 1931. The RDG planned to also electrify tracks between West Trenton and the CNJ Terminal in Jersey City for long-distance service, but had to drop plans for electrification outside of the commuter service area due to economic setbacks as a result of the Great Depression.

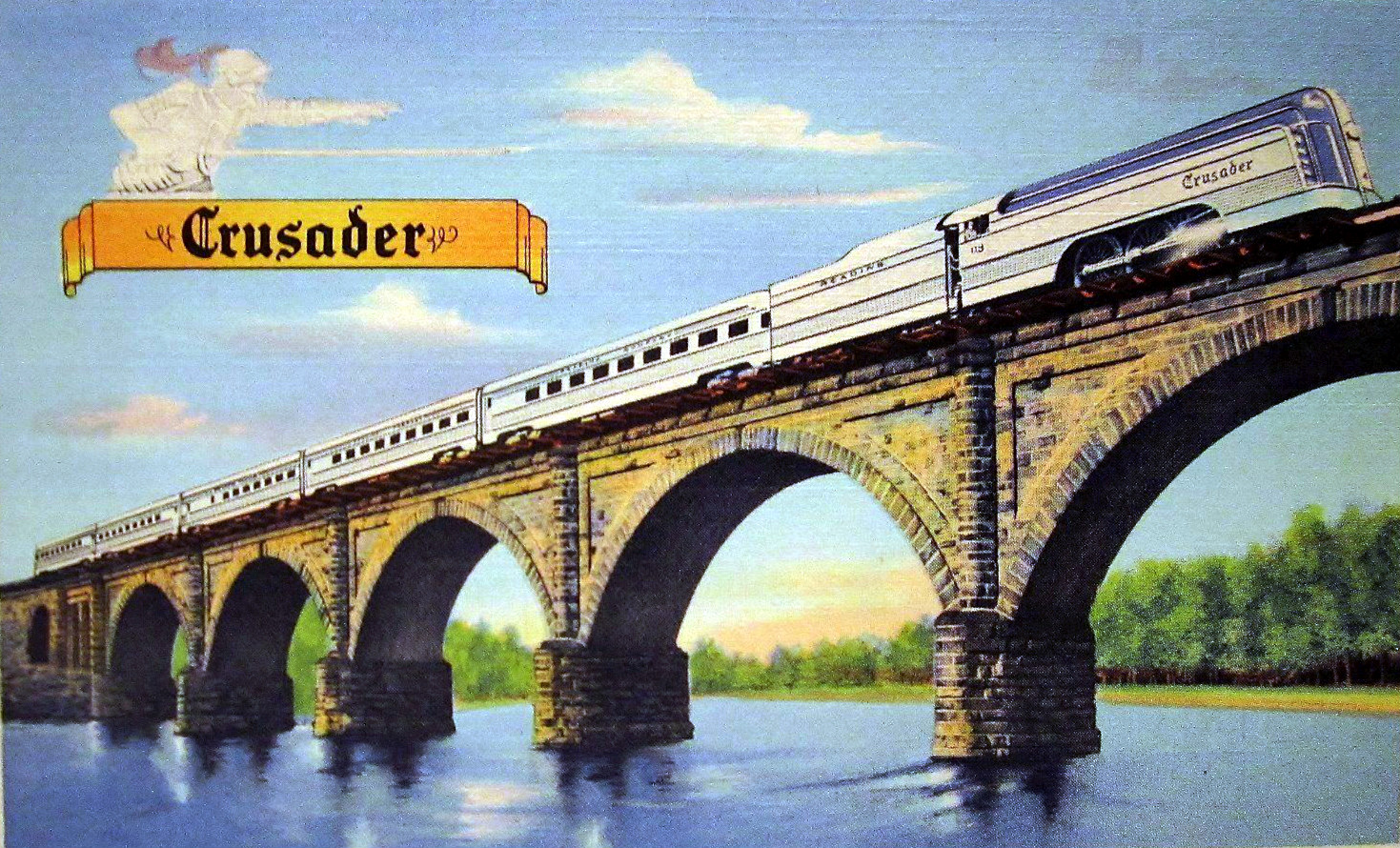
Reading Railroad Crusader streamliner

The line north of the split at Jenkintown was originally built as the National Railway project, opened on May 1, 1876, to provide an alternate to the United New Jersey Railroad and Canal Companies' monopoly over Philadelphia-New York City travel. From Jenkintown to the Delaware River it was built by the North Pennsylvania Railroad as a branch, while the New Jersey section was built by the Delaware and Bound Brook Railroad, merging with the Central Railroad of New Jersey at Bound Brook. In addition to the Reading Company, which leased the North Pennsylvania Railroad in 1879, the Baltimore and Ohio Railroad also used the line for passenger and freight service to New York City, including its famed Royal Blue service. In 1976 the Reading merged into Conrail, and in 1983 SEPTA took over operations.

Former R3 Logo

Prior to 1981, limited service continued north to Newark, New Jersey (Jersey City prior to the Aldene Plan of the 1960s), using Budd Company-built Diesel multiple units. This service was the last remains of the Reading's Crusader service, which began in 1937 using streamlined steam locomotives and passenger cars. SEPTA ended service beyond West Trenton on August 1, 1981; connecting NJT diesel service lasted until December 1982. NJT has since considered service resumption on their West Trenton Line.

Beginning in 1984 the route was designated R1 West Trenton as part of SEPTA's diametrical reorganization of its lines. West Trenton Line trains operated through the city center to the Airport Line on the ex-Pennsylvania side of the system. In later years this behavior changed; the line was designated R3 West Trenton and trains continued on to the Media/Elwyn Line on weekdays and the Airport Line on weekends. The R-number naming system was dropped on July 25, 2010. As of 2022, most West Trenton Line trains terminate at 30th Street Station on weekdays, while most evening trains operate to Malvern or Thorndale on the Paoli/Thorndale Line. Most weekend trains operate to Chestnut Hill West on the Chestnut Hill West Line.

On April 9, 2020, service on the line was suspended due to the COVID-19 pandemic, though stations between Center City and Jenkintown–Wyncote were still being served by other rail services. Service resumed on June 15, 2020.

== Stations ==
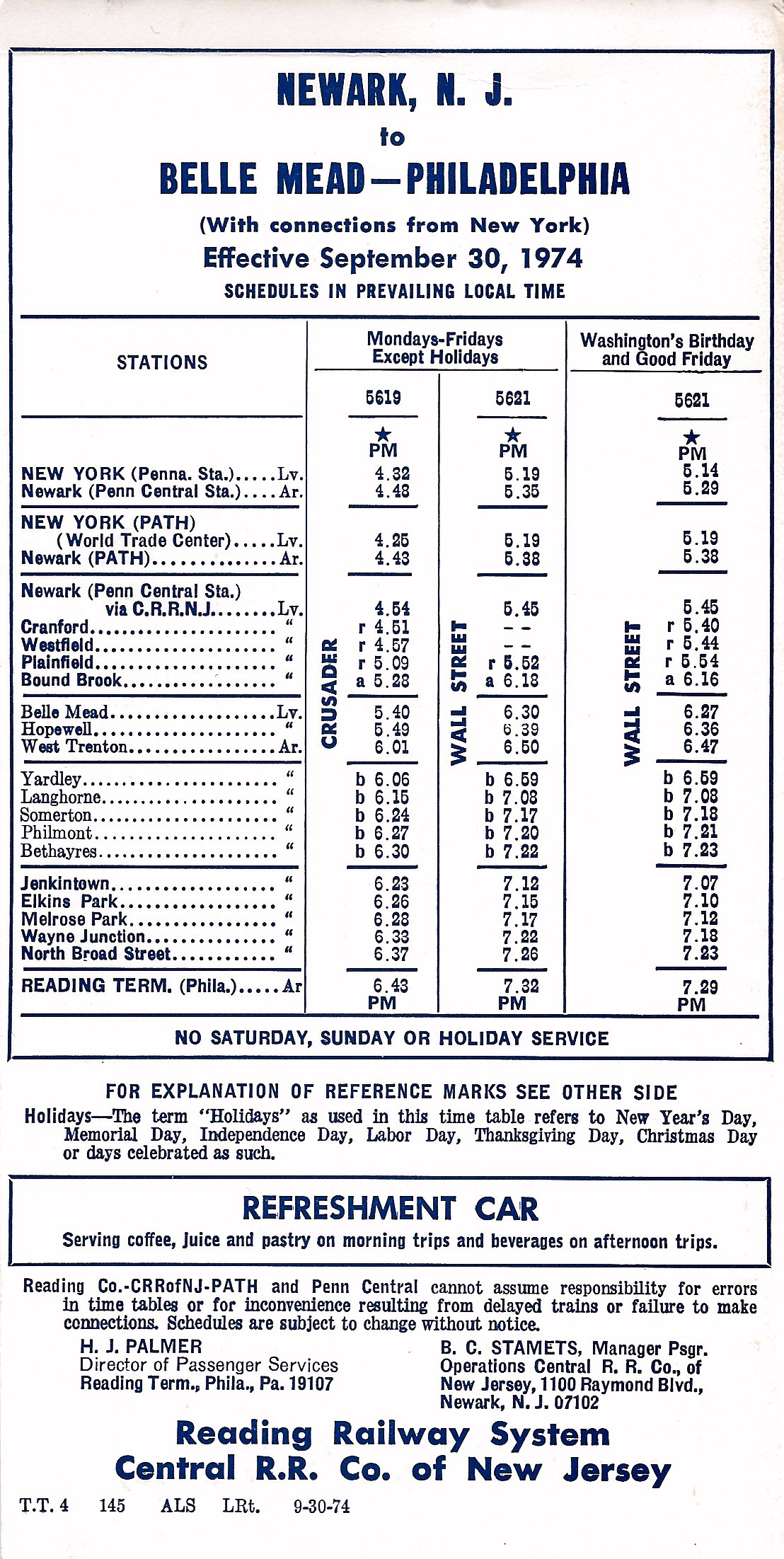
Passenger Schedule (eff. 1974-09-30) of Reading Railway and Central Railroad of New Jersey joint service between Newark, New Jersey and Philadelphia's Reading Terminal via Belle Mead, New Jersey on today's SEPTA's West Trenton Line and NJT Raritan Valley Line.

The West Trenton Line includes the following stations north of the Center City Commuter Connection; stations indicated with a gray background are closed. The train expresses from Bethayres to Temple University inbound on some trains in the morning and expresses outbound from Temple University to Jenkintown on some trains in the evening.

State	Zone	Location	Station	Miles (km) from Center City	Date opened	Connections / notes
PA	C	Temple University	Temple University	2.1 (3.4)		SEPTA Regional Rail: all lines except the Cynwyd Line; SEPTA City Bus: 3, 23, 47
PA	1	Olney-Oak Lane	Logan			Discontinued October 4, 1992
PA	1	Olney-Oak Lane	Tabor			
PA	1	Olney-Oak Lane	Fern Rock; Transit Center	7.3 (11.7)		SEPTA Regional Rail: SEPTA Metro: SEPTA City Bus: 4, 28, 57, 70
PA	2	Melrose Park	Melrose Park	8.4 (13.5)		SEPTA Regional Rail:
PA	2	Elkins Park	Elkins Park	9.2 (14.8)	May 14, 1899	SEPTA Regional Rail: SEPTA City Bus: 28
PA	3	Jenkintown	Jenkintown–Wyncote	10.8 (17.4)		SEPTA Regional Rail: SEPTA City Bus: 77
PA	3	Noble	Noble	12.0 (19.3)		SEPTA City Bus: 55
PA	3	Rydal	Rydal	12.8 (20.6)		
PA	3	Abington	Meadowbrook	13.8 (22.2)		
PA	3	Bethayres	Bethayres	15.1 (24.3)		SEPTA City Bus: 24, 88
PA	3	Huntingdon Valley	Philmont	16.4 (26.4)		
PA	3	Somerton, Philadelphia	Forest Hills	17.7 (28.5)		SEPTA City Bus: 84
PA	3	Somerton, Philadelphia	Somerton	18.2 (29.3)		SEPTA City Bus: 58, 84
PA	3	Bensalem Twp.	Trevose	19.9 (32.0)		
PA	3	Bensalem Twp.	Neshaminy Falls	21.1 (34.0)		SEPTA City Bus: 58
PA	3	Penndel	Parkland			Closed March 1978
PA	4	Langhorne	Langhorne	23.9 (38.5)		SEPTA City Bus: 14; SEPTA Suburban Bus: 130
PA	4	Middletown Twp.				
PA	4	Middletown Twp.	Fairless Junction			Closed March 1978
PA	4	Middletown Twp.	Woodbourne	26.4 (42.5)		
PA	4	Yardley	Yardley	30.8 (49.6)		
NJ	NJ	West Trenton	West Trenton	32.5 (52.3)		NJ Transit Bus: 608

== Ridership ==
Between FY 2013–FY 2019 yearly ridership on the West Trenton Line held steady at 3.3–3.5 million, except for a dip to 3 million in FY 2018, before collapsing during the COVID-19 pandemic. (Note: Data for individual lines is not available for FY 2020.)
