= New York Branch =

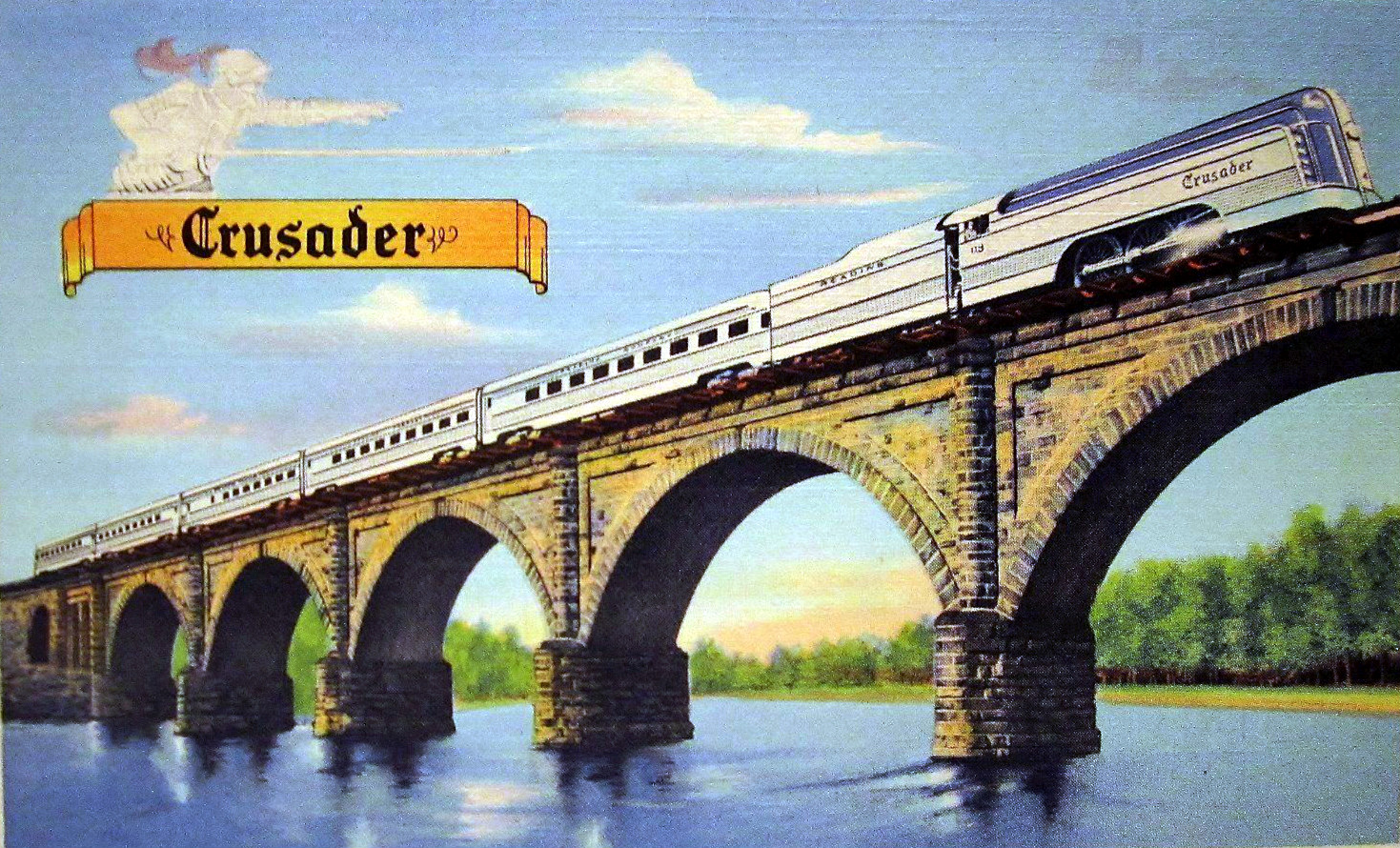
- An illustration of The Crusader on the West Trenton Railroad Bridge

Overview
- Status: Conveyed to Conrail

Service
- System: Reading Company

History
- Opened: 1 May 1876
- Philadelphia and Reading lease: 14 May 1879
- Electrified to West Trenton: 26 July 1931
- Conveyed to Conrail: 1 April 1976

Technical
- Line length: 47.6 mi (76.6 km)
- Track gauge: 4 ft 8 1/2 in (1,435 mm) standard gauge
- Electrification: 12 kV 25 Hz overhead line

The New York Branch or the Bound Brook Route was a railway line in Pennsylvania and New Jersey. It was operated by the Reading Company and owned by two of its subsidiaries, the North Pennsylvania Railroad and the Delaware and Bound Brook Railroad. It formed part of the Reading's route from Philadelphia to New York City, used by the famed Crusader. The line was transferred to Conrail in 1976 and was split into the Neshaminy Line and Trenton Line. SEPTA continues to operate commuter trains to West Trenton as part of its West Trenton Line.

== Route ==
The North Pennsylvania Railroad portion began at Jenkintown, where it split from the Bethlehem Branch. The line ran east-northeast through Montgomery County and Bucks County, eventually crossing the Delaware River at West Trenton, New Jersey. In the middle of the bridge, Delaware and Bound Brook ownership began. The line continued northeast into New Jersey to Bound Brook Junction, where it joined the Central of New Jersey Railroad's main line.

== History ==
The New York Branch was a cooperative effort between the North Pennsylvania Railroad, founded in 1852, and the Delaware and Bound Brook Railroad, a new company and part of the National Railway scheme. The goal was to construct a "New Line" between New York and Philadelphia, which could compete with the Pennsylvania Railroad. The North Pennsylvania extended its line north from Jenkintown to Yardley, on the Delaware River, while the Delaware and Bound Brook constructed a new line from West Trenton to Bound Brook, New Jersey, where it joined the Central Railroad of New Jersey. The line opened for through traffic on May 1, 1876, in time for the Centennial Exposition.

The Philadelphia and Reading Railroad, forerunner of the Reading Company, leased the Delaware and Bound Brook Railroad and North Pennsylvania Railroad on May 14, 1879, thus acquiring control of the "New Line" between Philadelphia and New York. The Baltimore and Ohio Railroad, involved in perennial disputes with the PRR, re-routed its passenger trains over the branch on October 1, 1880. The Reading electrified the New York Branch between Jenkintown and West Trenton in 1931; electric trains began operating from the Reading Terminal on July 26, 1931. The onset of the Great Depression forestalled further electrification.

The Reading Company and its subsidiaries were incorporated into Conrail; the New York Branch was designated to Conrail as part of the United States Railway Association's "Final System Plan". Under Conrail the branch was split: the section between Neshaminy Falls and Bound Brook was combined with the New York Short Line, the Low Grade Branch, and the Richmond Branch to form the Trenton Line, while the section between Neshaminy and Jenkintown was designated the Neshaminy Line and is now owned by SEPTA. Conrail continued to operate commuter service under contract until 1983, when SEPTA assumed full control; passenger service north of West Trenton ended on August 1, 1981. SEPTA service between West Trenton and Philadelphia continues as the West Trenton Line.
