= Yardley station =

SEPTA train station in Yardley, Pennsylvania, United States

Yardley
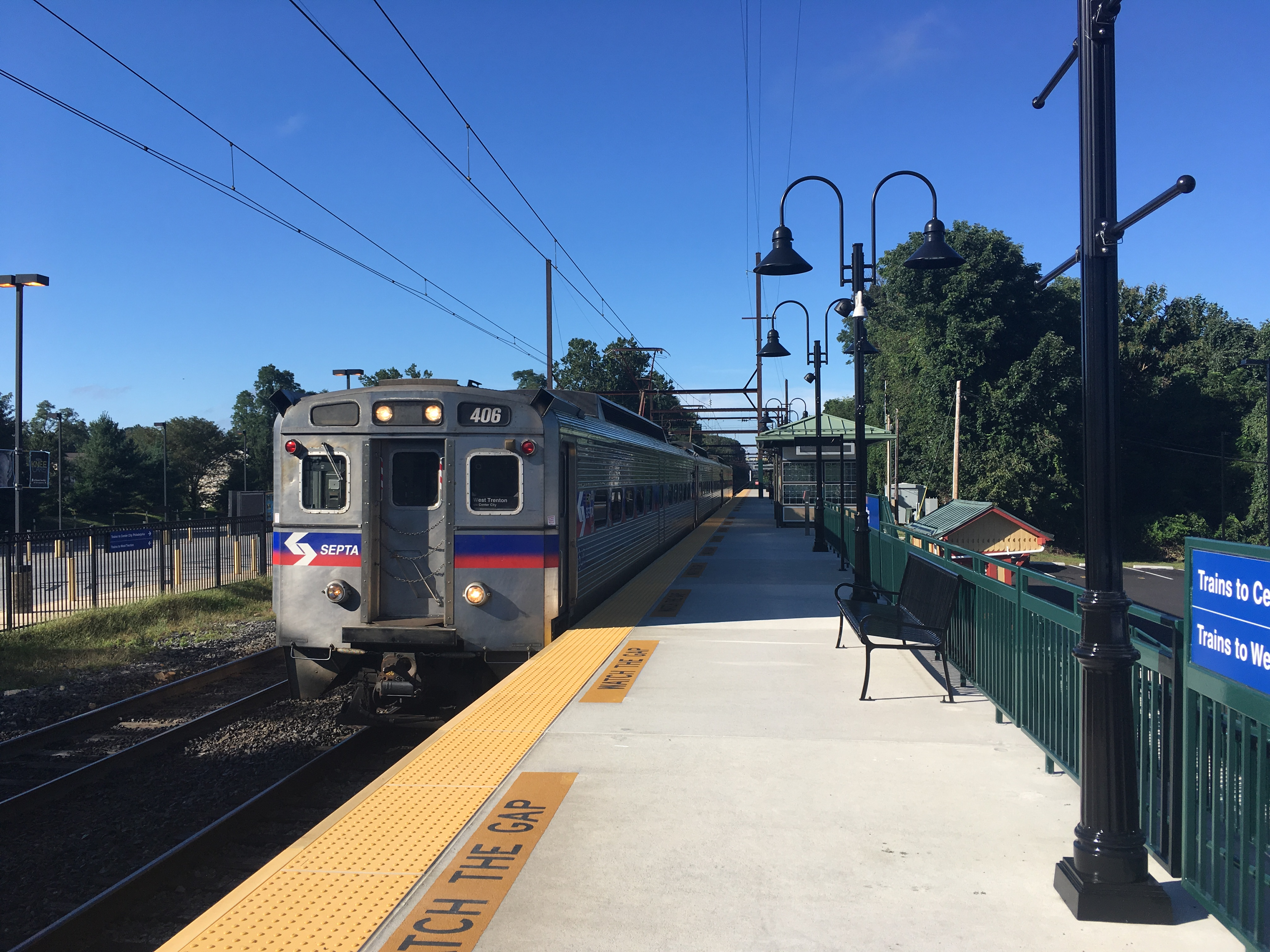
- Outbound train arriving in 2018

General information
- Location: Reading Avenue and Main Street; Yardley, Pennsylvania, U.S.
- Coordinates: 40.2351°N 74.8310°W
- Owner: SEPTA
- Line: Neshaminy Line
- Platforms: 1 side platform
- Tracks: 2

Construction
- Parking: 275
- Cycle facilities: 2 bike racks (4 total spots)
- Accessible: Yes

Other information
- Fare zone: 4

History
- Opened: April 27, 1876 (ceremonial service); May 1, 1876 (regular service)
- Electrified: July 26, 1931

Passengers
- 2017: 349 boardings 328 alightings (weekday average)
- Rank: 79 of 146

Services
Preceding station	SEPTA	Following station
Woodbourne toward Penn Medicine Station	West Trenton Line	West Trenton Terminus
Former services
Preceding station	Reading Railroad	Following station
Roelofs toward Philadelphia	New York Branch	West Trenton toward Bound Brook
Location

Yardley station is a SEPTA Regional Rail station in Yardley, Pennsylvania. It is located at Main Street and Reading Avenue and serves the West Trenton Line to New Jersey. The station has off-street parking. In FY 2017, Yardley station had a weekday average of 349 boardings and 328 alightings. By August 2015, as a result of the SEPTA and CSX separation between Woodbourne and West Trenton stations, the outbound platform was removed, and all SEPTA traffic was diverted onto the Inbound track. Currently, all SEPTA service between Yardley and West Trenton operates on the Inbound track only.

== History ==
The station was originally built to be part of the Bound Brook branch of the Philadelphia & Reading Railroad (P&R). In 1874, it was announced that the P&R would build a line from Jenkintown station to the Delaware River where it would have a bridge to connect it to the Delaware and Bound Railroad.

== Station layout ==
Yardley consists of a single high-level side platform.

== Bibliography ==
- Poor, Henry Varnum (1865). Manual of the Railroads of the United States: Volume 27. H.V. & H.W. Poor.
- Warner, Paul T. (May 1957). "Eight-Wheelers Between New York and Philadelphia 1870 - 1900". The Railway and Locomotive Historical Society Bulletin (96): 44–62. ISSN 0033-8842. JSTOR 43520154.
