= Columbia Railroad Bridge =

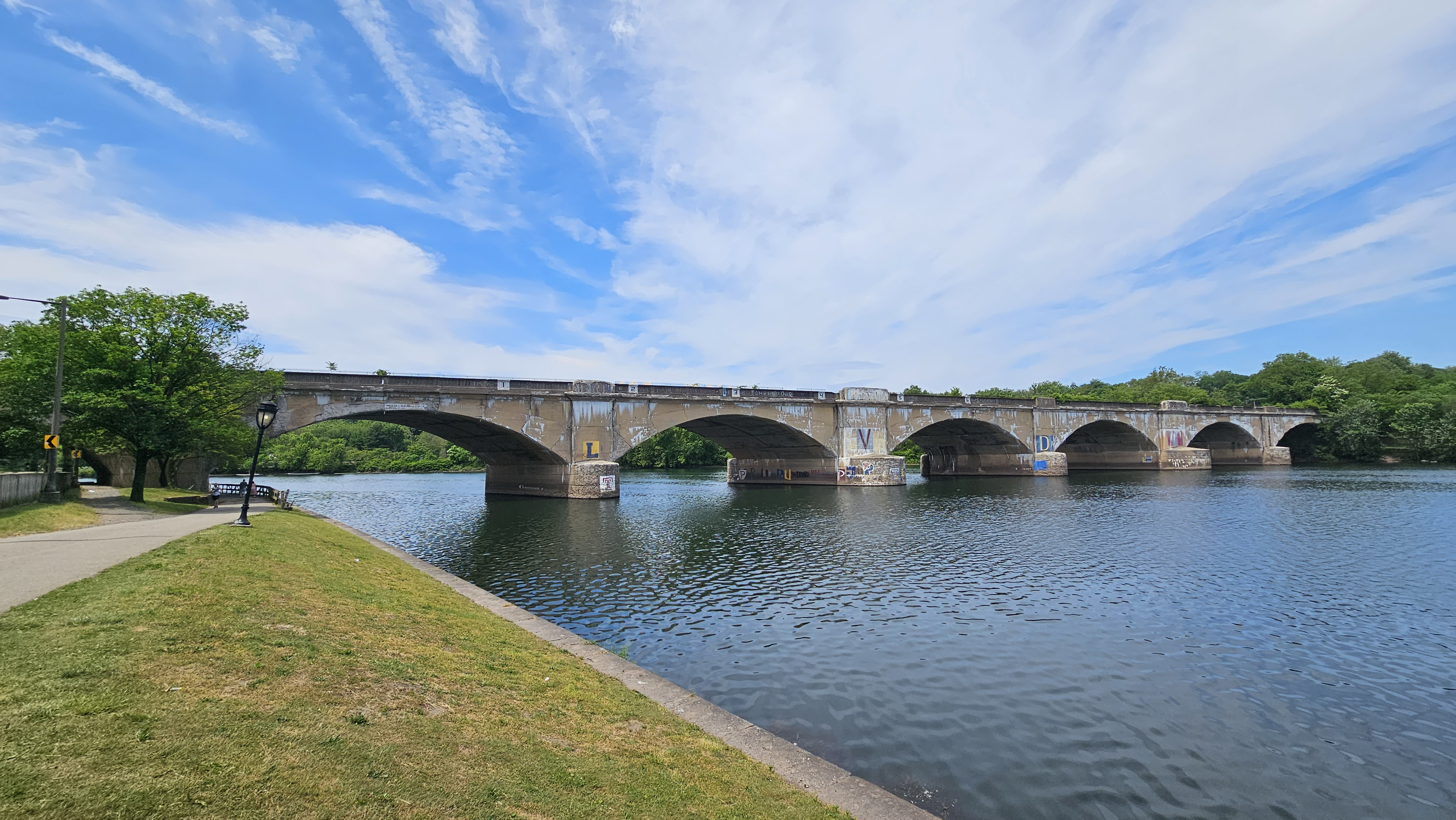
- The bridge in 2023
- Coordinates: 39°59′08″N 75°12′13″W
- Carries: CSX Trenton Subdivision
- Crosses: Kelly Drive, Schuylkill River, Dr. Martin Luther King, Jr. Drive
- Locale: Philadelphia, Pennsylvania
- Other name: Columbia Bridge

Characteristics
- Design: Arch bridge, closed spandrel
- Material: Concrete
- Total length: Total length between face abutments is 971 feet 3 7/8 inches.
- Width: Total width under coping is 57 feet 6 inches.
- No. of spans: 8

History
- Designer: Samuel Tobias Wagner, Chief Engineer for the Philadelphia & Reading Railway
- Constructed by: Pennsylvania & Reading Railway, with contracts for grading and the construction of the masonry, including the foundations, were placed with Messrs. Seeds & Derham, of Philadelphia. The waterproofing was done under contract with the Minwax Company of New York. The removal of the old wrought iron superstructure was by Henry Hitner & Sons, Philadelphia.
- Construction start: July 1917
- Opened: Railroad traffic first crossed on two tracks 24 March 1920 at 11 am. The completion of the bridge, rail traffic all four tracks, was 11 October 1921.

Location
- Interactive map of Columbia Railroad Bridge

Columbia Railroad Bridge, also known as Columbia Bridge, is a 1920 concrete arch bridge in Philadelphia, Pennsylvania, that carries CSX Trenton Subdivision rail lines over the Schuylkill River. Located in Fairmount Park, upstream of the Pennsylvania Railroad Connecting Bridge, it is the third railroad bridge at the site. Near its east abutment are the Schuylkill Grandstand (for viewing rowing regattas) and the John B. Kelly statue.

== First bridge ==
The first bridge at this location was an 1834 covered bridge of white pine and seven spans. It was built by the Commonwealth of Pennsylvania for the Philadelphia and Columbia Railroad, which connected Philadelphia with Columbia in Lancaster County. An inclined plane on the bridge's west side drew the railway cars up Belmont Hill by cable. In 1851, the Philadelphia and Reading Railway bought the bridge from the state.

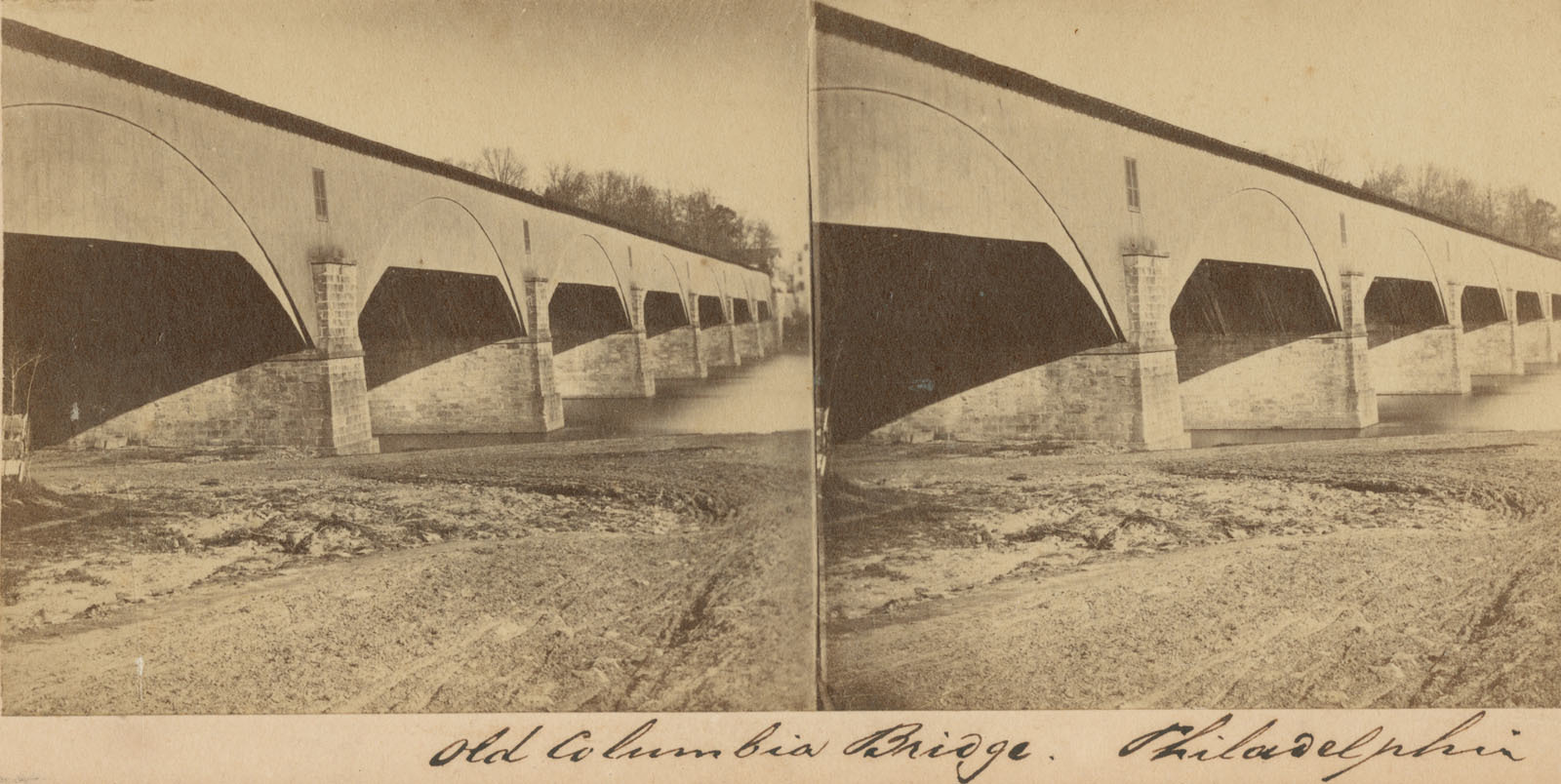
Stereographic photos of the Columbia Railway Bridge (1859).

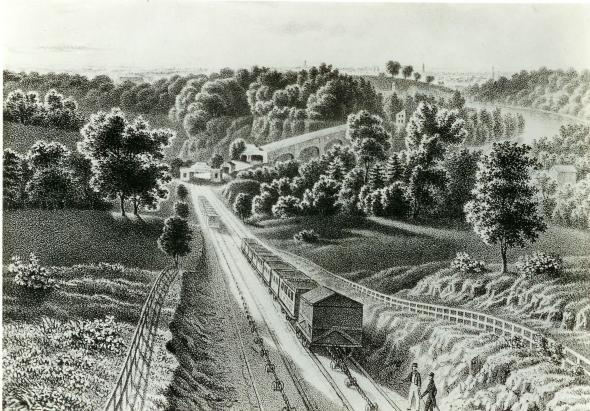
"View from the Inclined Plane" (1838). The first Philadelphia & Columbia Railroad Bridge is visible at the bottom of the hill.

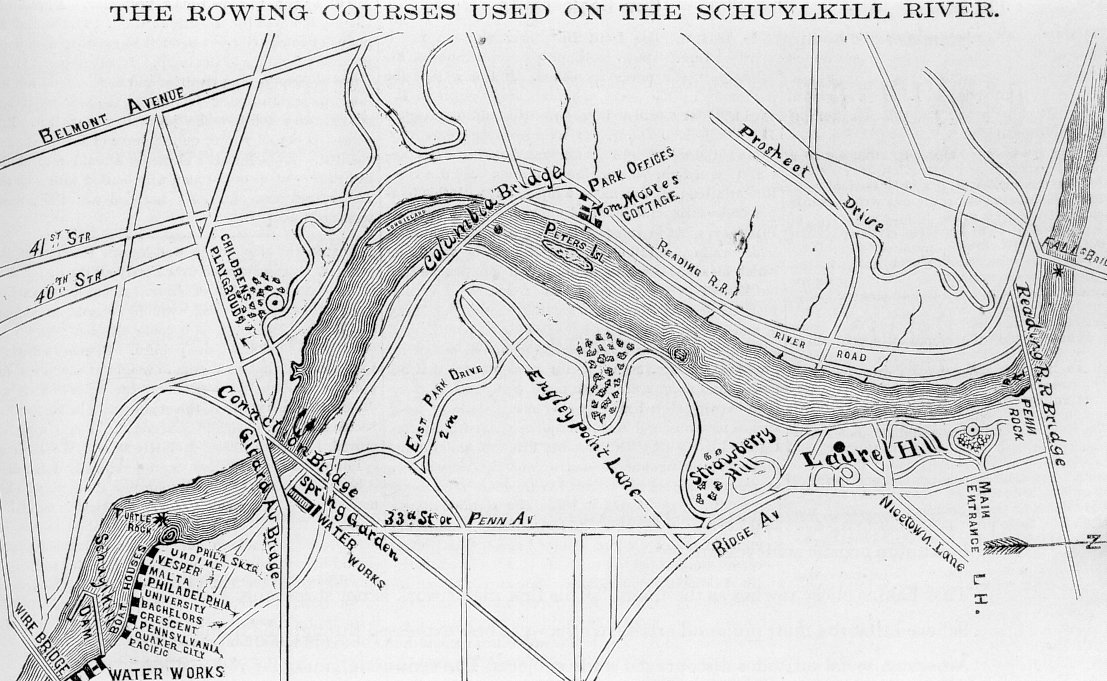
Schuylkill River map (1872).

== Second bridge ==
The second bridge was erected in 1886 by the Philadelphia and Reading Railway to carry increasingly heavy freight traffic. It was a two-track, wrought-iron Pratt truss bridge that served until 1920.

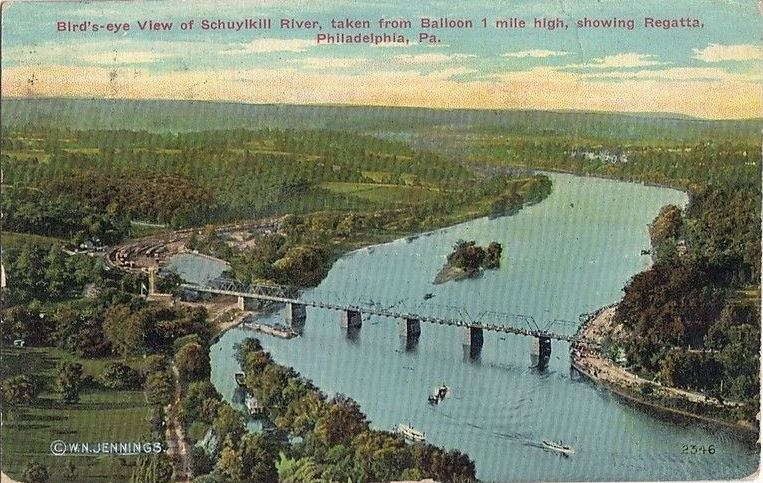
Second Columbia Railroad Bridge (circa 1917).

== Current bridge ==
The current bridge was completed in 1920 with two tracks. Two more were added in 1921, but now there are only two tracks on this bridge.

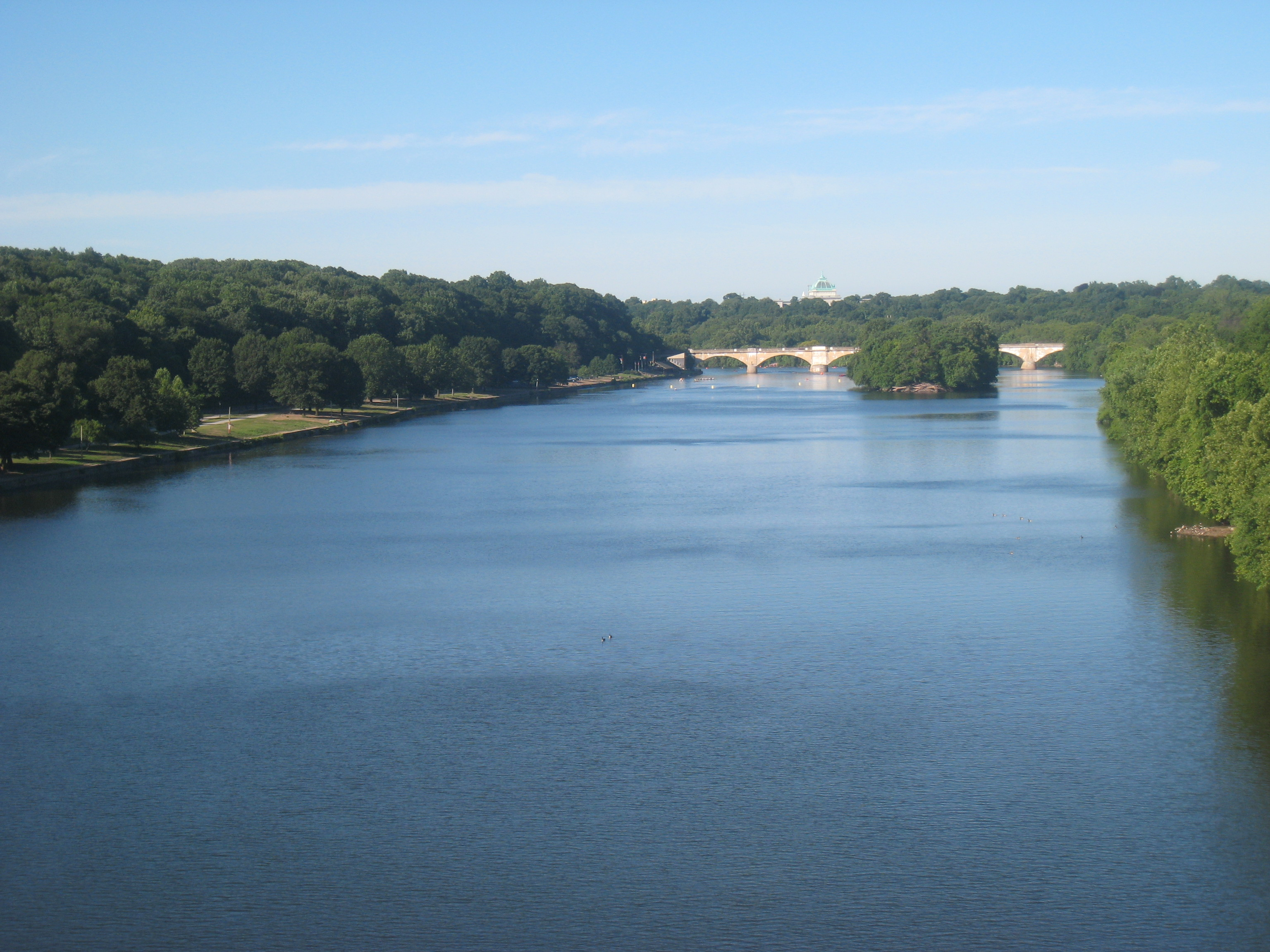
From upstream.

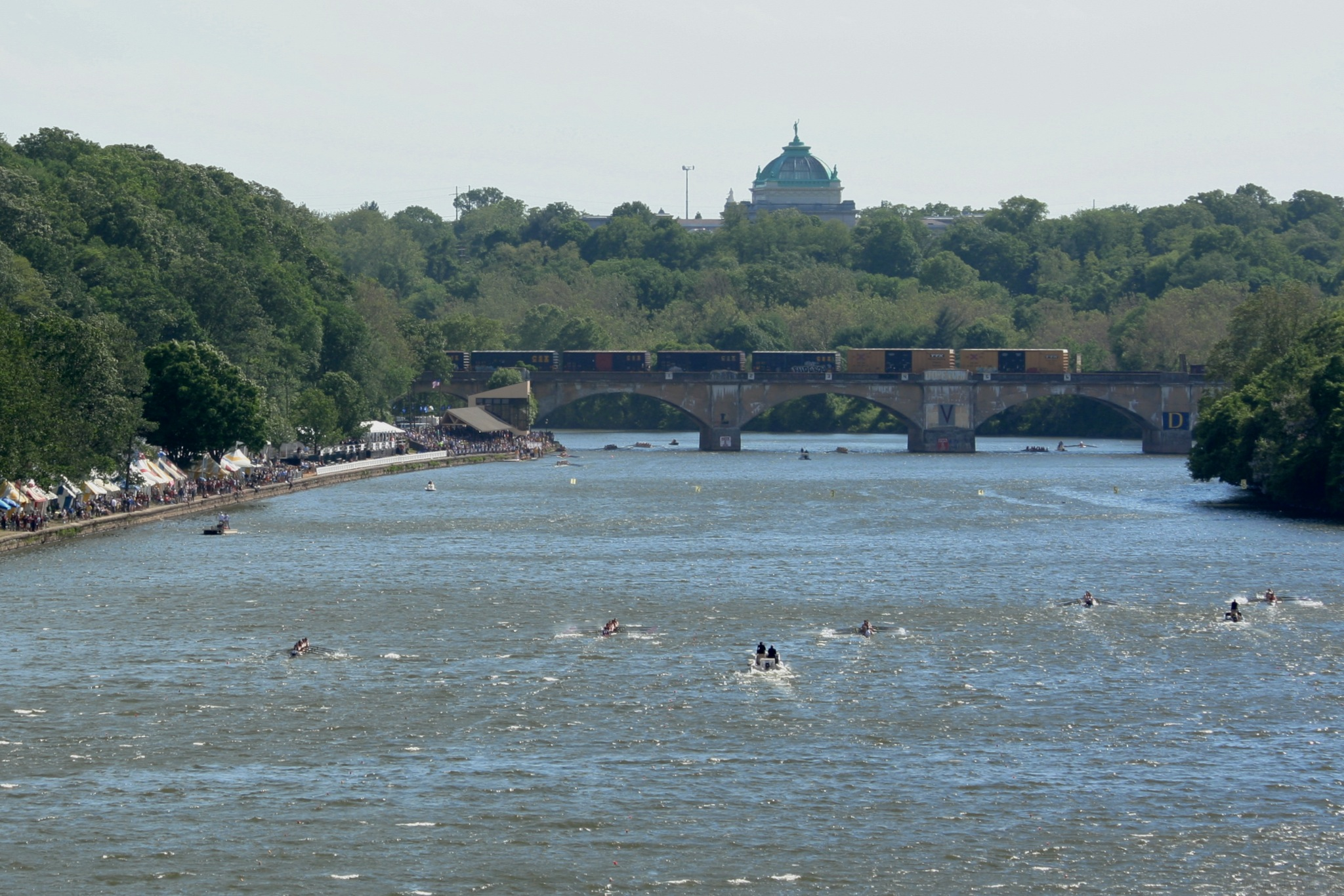
2010 Dad Vail Regatta.

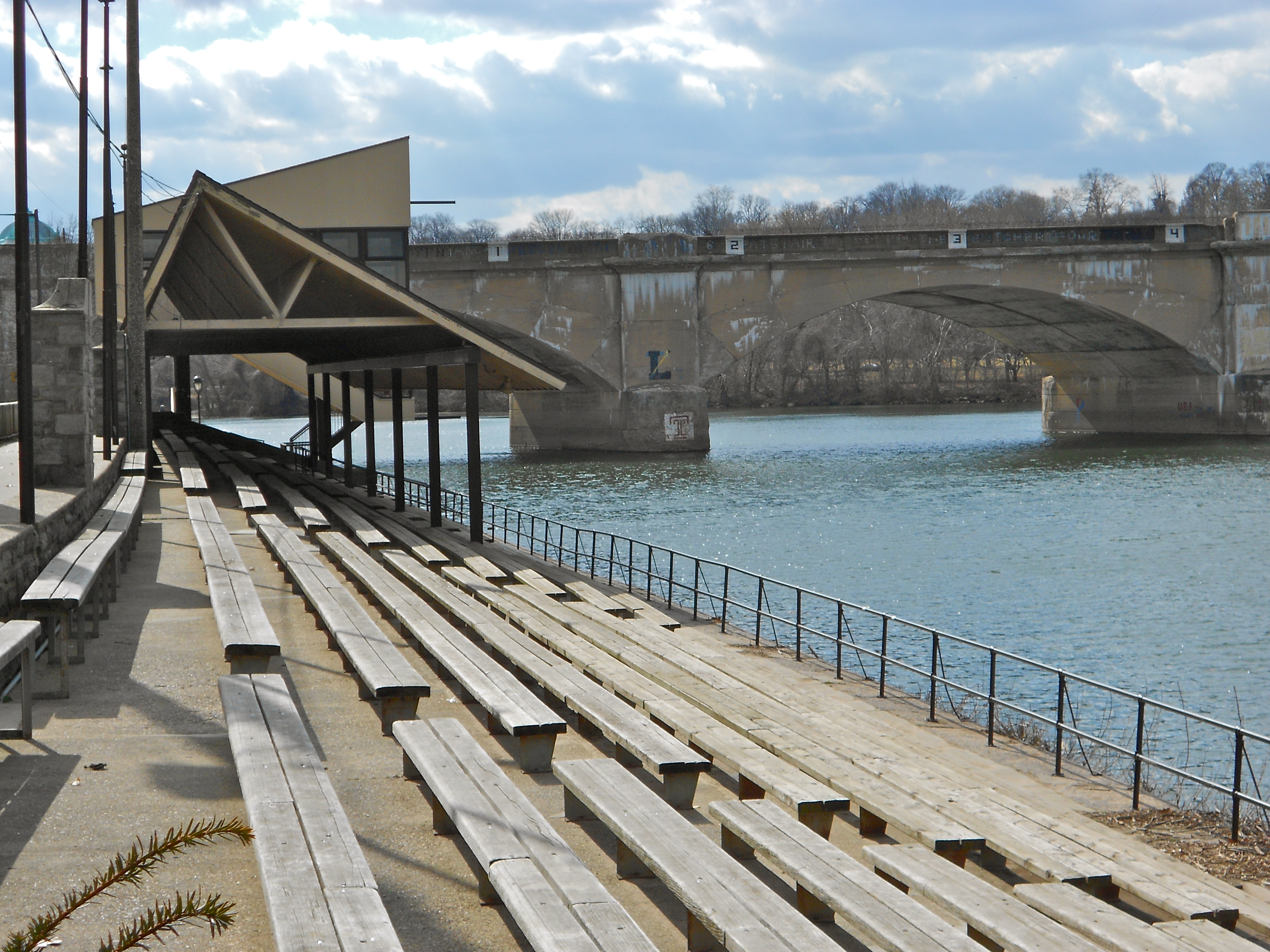
Schuylkill Grandstand.

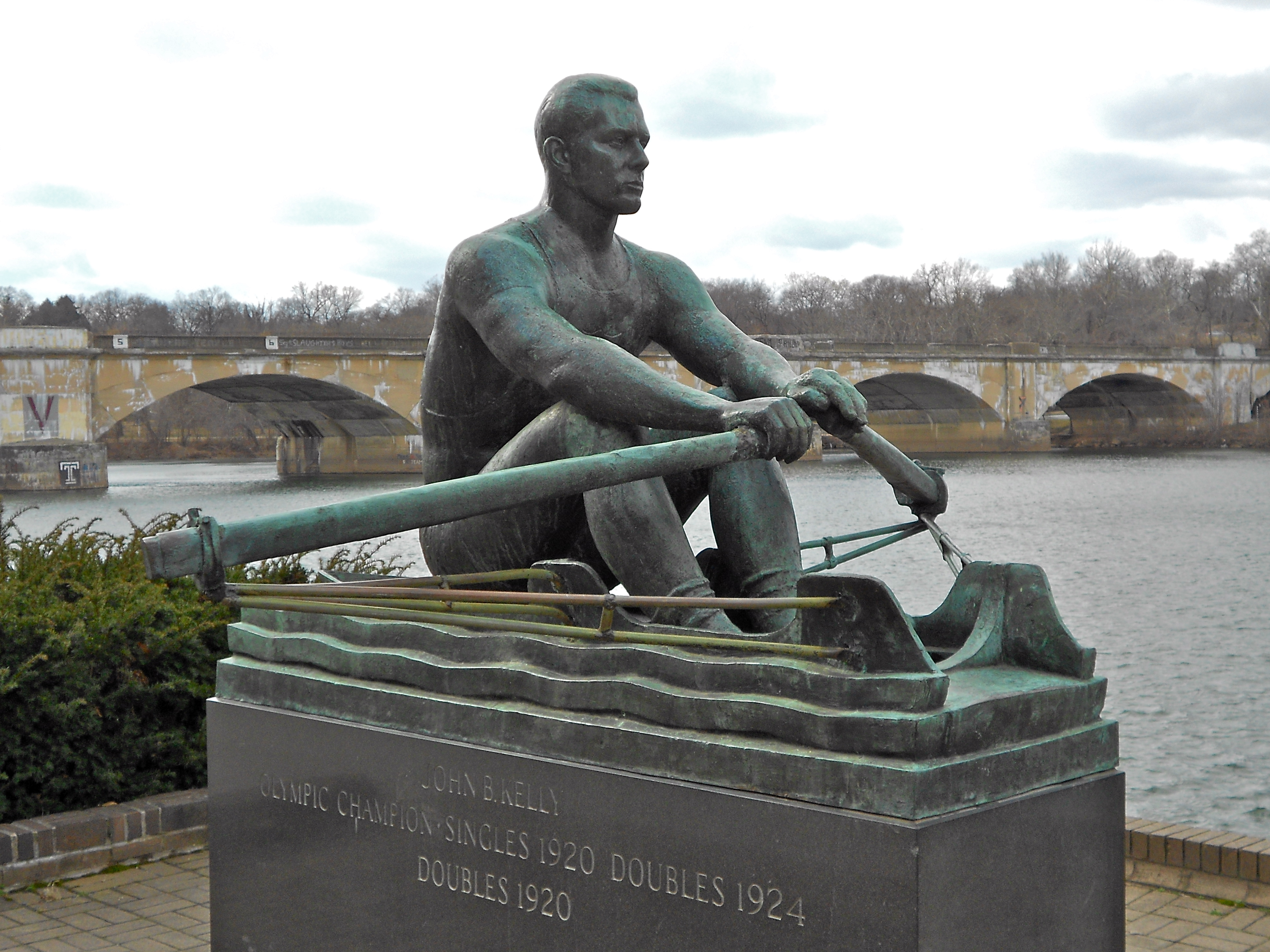
John B. Kelly statue.

== See also ==
- List of crossings of the Schuylkill River
- Main Line of Public Works
