= Trenton station (Reading Railroad) =

- Philadelphia and Reading Railroad Freight Station
- U.S. National Register of Historic Places
- New Jersey Register of Historic Places
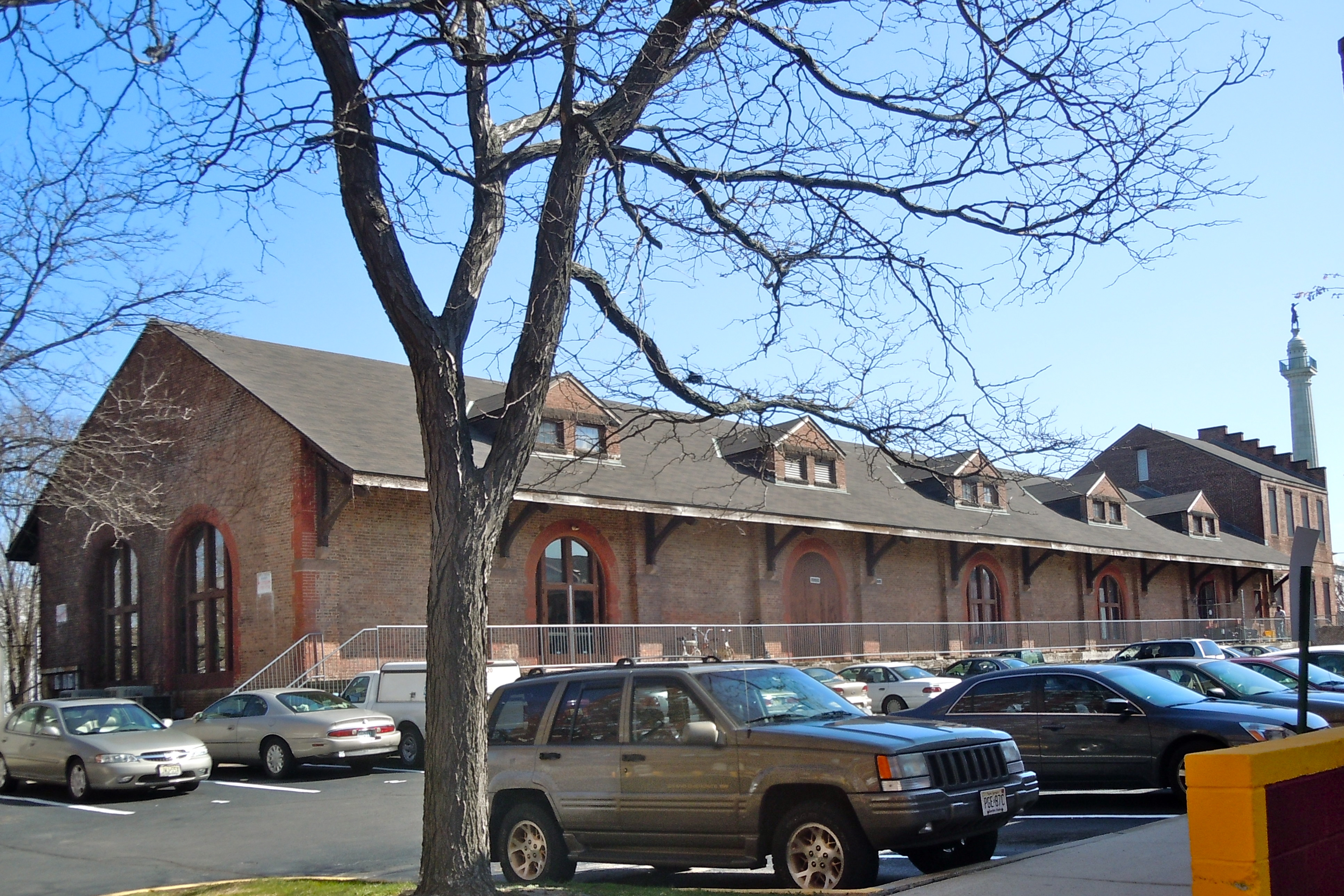

- Location within Mercer County, New Jersey Location within New Jersey Location within the United States
- Location: 260 North Willow Street, Trenton, New Jersey
- Coordinates: 40°13′32″N 74°45′59″W
- Area: 1.4 acres (0.57 ha)
- Built: 1888
- Architect: Kimball, Francis H.
- NRHP reference No.: 79001503
- NJRHP No.: 1789

Significant dates
- Added to NRHP: May 14, 1979
- Designated NJRHP: February 22, 1979

Trenton is a historic railroad station located in Trenton, Mercer County, New Jersey, United States. The station was built in 1888 by the Philadelphia and Reading Railroad. It was located on the railroad's Trenton Branch. It was added to the National Register of Historic Places on May 14, 1979, as the Philadelphia and Reading Railroad Freight Station.

== See also ==
- National Register of Historic Places listings in Mercer County, New Jersey

Preceding station	Reading Railroad	Following station
Trenton Junction Terminus	Trenton Branch	Terminus
