= New York Short Line =

American railway line (1906–1976)

History
- Opened: 27 May 1906
- Conveyed to Conrail: 1 April 1976

Technical
- Track gauge: 1,435 mm (4 ft 8 1/2 in) standard gauge
- Electrification: 12 kV 25 Hz overhead line

The New York Short Line was a railway line in Pennsylvania. It was operated by the Reading Company and built by the New York Short Line Railroad, a subsidiary. It was opened in 1906 to provide a more direct route between Philadelphia and New York City, bypassing the existing route via Jenkintown. The line was conveyed to Conrail in 1976 and is now part of the Trenton Subdivision of CSX.

== History ==
The Philadelphia and Reading Railway, together with the Central Railroad of New Jersey, maintained its own route between Philadelphia and New York City independent of the Pennsylvania Railroad's Northeast Corridor. Trains came north up the Ninth Street Branch from Reading Terminal via Wayne Junction to the Bethlehem Branch, then east at Jenkintown on to the New York Branch. The New York-bound trains of the Baltimore and Ohio Railroad (B&O) also used this route.

The New York Short Line Railroad was incorporated on May 6, 1903, to build a new cutoff extending from the Newtown Branch at Cheltenham to the New York Branch at Neshaminy Falls. This line, some 9 miles (14 km) long, was 2.1 miles (3.4 km) shorter than the existing route and avoided the congested junction at Jenkintown. To reach Cheltenham, trains would move on the Newtown Branch at Newtown Junction, north of Wayne Junction.

The new line opened on May 27, 1906. To support the additional traffic, the Newtown Branch was double-tracked between Cheltenham and Newtown Junction. Administratively, the Newtown Branch's southern terminus was cut back to Cheltenham Junction once the New York Short Line opened, with the new branch extending from Neshaminy Falls to Newtown Junction. The New York Short Line Railroad was one of twelve Reading properties merged at the end of 1923 to create the new Reading Company. The section of the line from Newtown Junction to Cheltenham Junction was electrified on September 29, 1966, along with the Newtown Branch to Fox Chase.

With the Reading Company's final bankruptcy in 1976, the New York Short Line was conveyed to Conrail. SEPTA regional rail trains, now the Fox Chase Line, continued to share the branch with freight trains between Newtown Junction and Cheltenham Junction. In the mid-1980s, SEPTA studied the possibility of electrifying the branch between Cheltenham Junction and Neshaminy Falls.

The New York Short Line was eventually combined with several other lines to become part of the Trenton Line, later the Trenton Subdivision. Beginning in 1989 the shared double-tracked portion was functionally split, with Conrail and SEPTA each using one track. The two lines were physically separated in 2004–2005.
