= West Trenton Railroad Bridge =

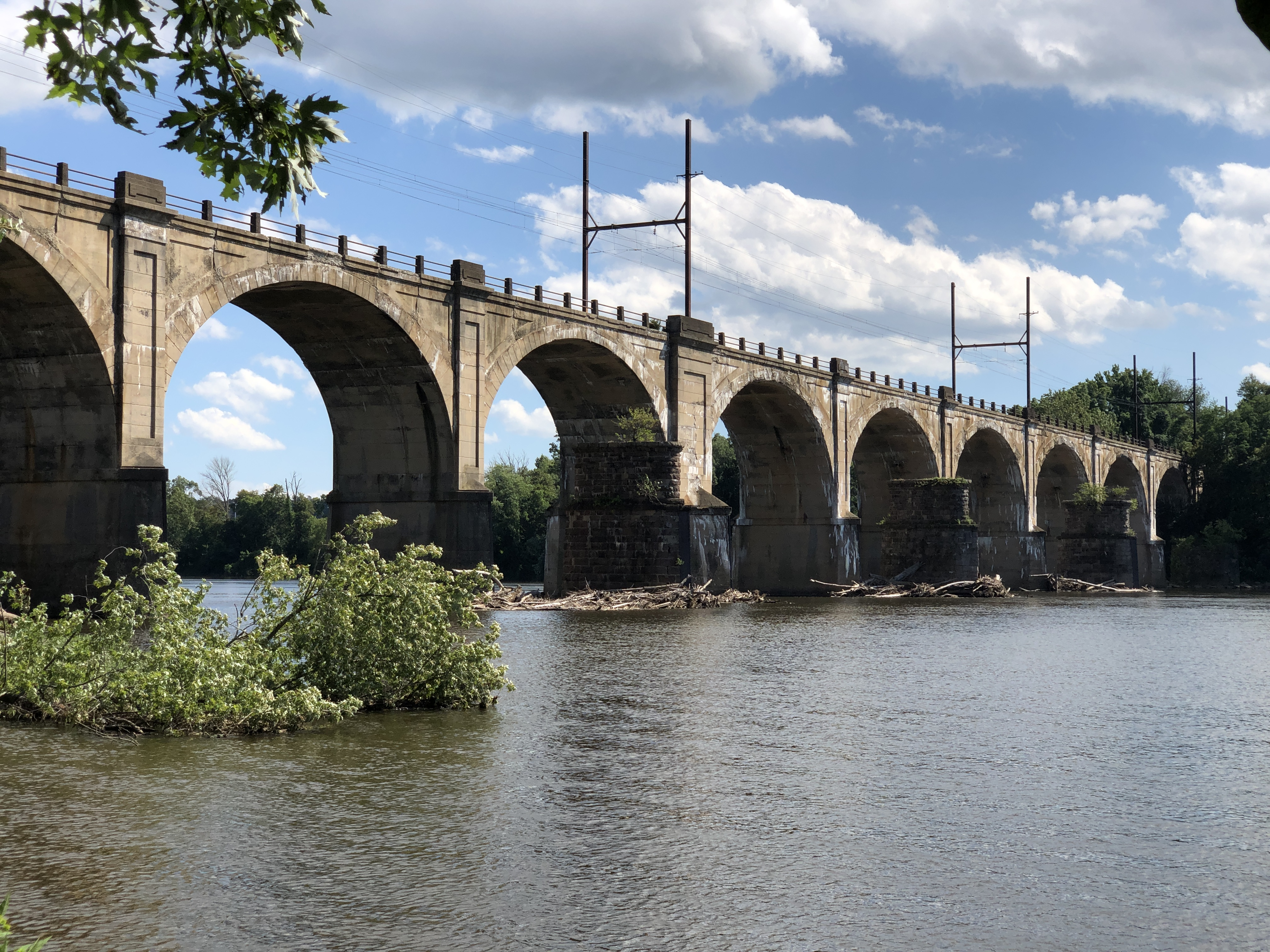
- Coordinates: 40.2417°N 74.8241°W
- Carries: CSX and SEPTA's West Trenton Line
- Crosses: Delaware River
- Locale: Lower Makefield Township, Bucks County, Pennsylvania and West Trenton, Ewing Township, Mercer County, New Jersey
- Maintained by: CSX

Characteristics
- Design: Concrete arch bridge
- Total length: 1,445.5 feet (440.6 m)

History
- Opened: August 29, 1913

The West Trenton Railroad Bridge is a concrete arch bridge carrying CSX's Trenton Subdivision and SEPTA's West Trenton Line across the Delaware River between Lower Makefield Township in Bucks County, Pennsylvania and the West Trenton section of Ewing Township in Mercer County, New Jersey. It was originally designed by the Philadelphia and Reading Railroad and was constructed from 1911 to 1913 by the F. W. Talbot Construction Company.

The bridge is 1,445.5 feet (440.6 m) long between abutments, and is made up of 14 arches, 11 of which have a clear span of 90.75 feet (27.66 m) and 3 with a clear span of 85.92 feet (26.19 m)

The masonry piers alongside this bridge carried the original 1875 wrought-iron truss bridge (Yardleyville Centennial Bridge).

== See also ==
- List of bridges documented by the Historic American Engineering Record in Pennsylvania
