= Trenton Subdivision =

Railway line in Pennsylvania and New Jersey

- CSX Transportation freight train on the Trenton Subdivision at Langhorne station

Overview
- Status: Operational
- Owner: CSX Transportation
- Locale: New Jersey and Pennsylvania
- Termini: Port Reading Junction in Manville, New Jersey; Philadelphia, Pennsylvania

Service
- Type: Freight rail and commuter rail
- System: CSX Transportation
- Operator: CSX Transportation

Technical
- Number of tracks: 1-2
- Track gauge: 1,435 mm (4 ft 8 1/2 in) standard gauge

The Trenton Subdivision is a railroad line owned by CSX Transportation in the U.S. states of Pennsylvania and New Jersey. The line runs from CP NICE in Philadelphia, Pennsylvania, northeast to Port Reading Junction in Manville, New Jersey. The line was formerly part of the Reading Company system.

At its south end, CP NICE, in Nicetown-Tioga, Philadelphia, the Trenton Subdivision becomes the Philadelphia Subdivision, Conrail and Norfolk Southern has trackage rights to go through CP Park to access the Delair Branch. The north end of the Trenton Subdivision at Port Reading Junction is where the Conrail Lehigh Line (in the North Jersey Shared Assets Area) heads northeast and the Norfolk Southern Railway Lehigh Line heads west.

SEPTA Regional Rail's West Trenton Line parallels the line from Neshaminy Falls, Pennsylvania to Ewing, New Jersey, they shared the tracks until 2015 when CSX built a bypass at West Trenton station. SEPTA's Fox Chase Line parallels the line from Newtown Junction to Cheltenham Township, having used it until 2005 when single-track service on the SEPTA line eliminated the need for usage of the freight track.

== History ==
The former southernmost piece of the Trenton Subdivision, from its south end across the Columbia Railroad Bridge to Belmont, opened in 1834 as part of the Main Line of Public Works. The Philadelphia and Reading Rail Road opened in 1839, including from Belmont north to the junction with the Norfolk Southern Railway's Harrisburg Line near the Falls of the Schuylkill. A branch of the Reading from the Falls east to Nicetown and southeast to Port Richmond opened in 1842, now the Trenton Subdivision from the Falls to Nicetown. The line south of Belmont was sold to the Reading in 1851.

The portion of the Trenton Subdivision from Olney (near Tabor Road) northeast to Cheltenham Township near Martins Mill Road opened in 1876 as part of the Philadelphia, Newtown and New York Railroad. That same year, the North Pennsylvania Railroad and Delaware and Bound Brook Railroad opened the New York Branch from Jenkintown, Pennsylvania (on the NPRR main line) northeast to the Central Railroad of New Jersey to Bridgewater, New Jersey, including the entire Trenton Subdivision north of Oakford, Pennsylvania. A cutoff from Cheltenham northeast to Oakford opened in 1906 as the New York Short Line Railroad.

All the above pieces became part of the Reading Company through leases and mergers, and part of Conrail in 1976. In the 1999 breakup of Conrail, the Trenton Subdivision was assigned to CSX Transportation.

Though trackage is owned by CSX, Norfolk Southern has Trackage Rights over the Trenton Subdivision, between CP Laurel Hill to CP Nice to go to Port Richmond, and CP River to Eastwick.

== See also ==
- List of CSX Transportation lines
