= West Trenton station =

SEPTA Regional Rail station in Ewing Township, New Jersey

West Trenton
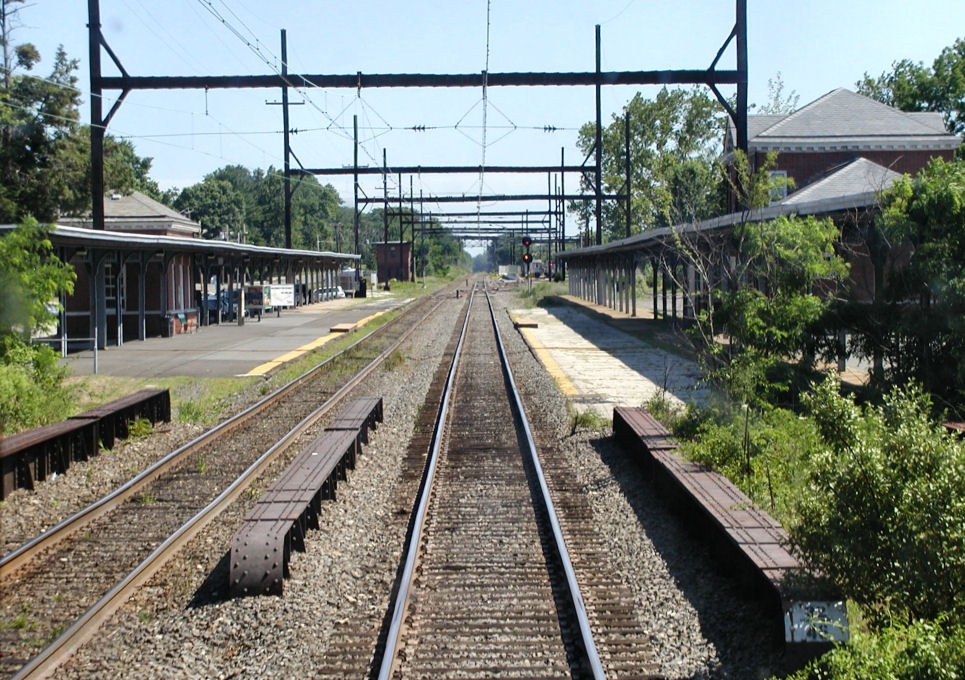
- West Trenton station platform, the bridge in front of the station goes over Grand Avenue and Sullivan Way.

General information
- Location: 3 Railroad Avenue; Ewing, New Jersey
- Coordinates: 40°15′26″N 74°48′55″W
- Owner: Southeastern Pennsylvania Transportation Authority
- Line: Neshaminy Line
- Platforms: 1 side platform
- Tracks: 2 (only 1 used by SEPTA)
- Connections: NJ Transit Bus: 608

Construction
- Parking: 142 spaces
- Cycle facilities: 4 rack spaces
- Accessible: No

Other information
- Fare zone: NJ

History
- Opened: April 27, 1876 (ceremonial service); May 1, 1876 (regular service)
- Rebuilt: October 1929–June 18, 1930
- Electrified: 1931
- Former names: Trenton Junction

Services
Preceding station	SEPTA	Following station
Yardley toward Penn Medicine Station	West Trenton Line	Terminus
Former services
Preceding station	Conrail	Following station
Yardley toward Reading Terminal	Crusader and Wall Street 1976–1981	Hopewell closed 1982 toward Newark
Yardley toward Reading Terminal	West Trenton Line 1981–1982 (SEPTA)	Terminus
Terminus	West Trenton Line 1981–1982 (NJ Transit)	Hopewell closed 1982 toward Newark
Preceding station	Reading Railroad	Following station
Yardley toward Philadelphia	New York Branch	Ewing toward Bound Brook
Terminus	Trenton Branch	Trenton Terminus
Preceding station	Baltimore and Ohio Railroad	Following station
Jenkintown toward Philadelphia: Chestnut St. or Reading Terminal	Philadelphia – Jersey City Local	Bound Brook toward Jersey City
- West Trenton Station
- U.S. National Register of Historic Places
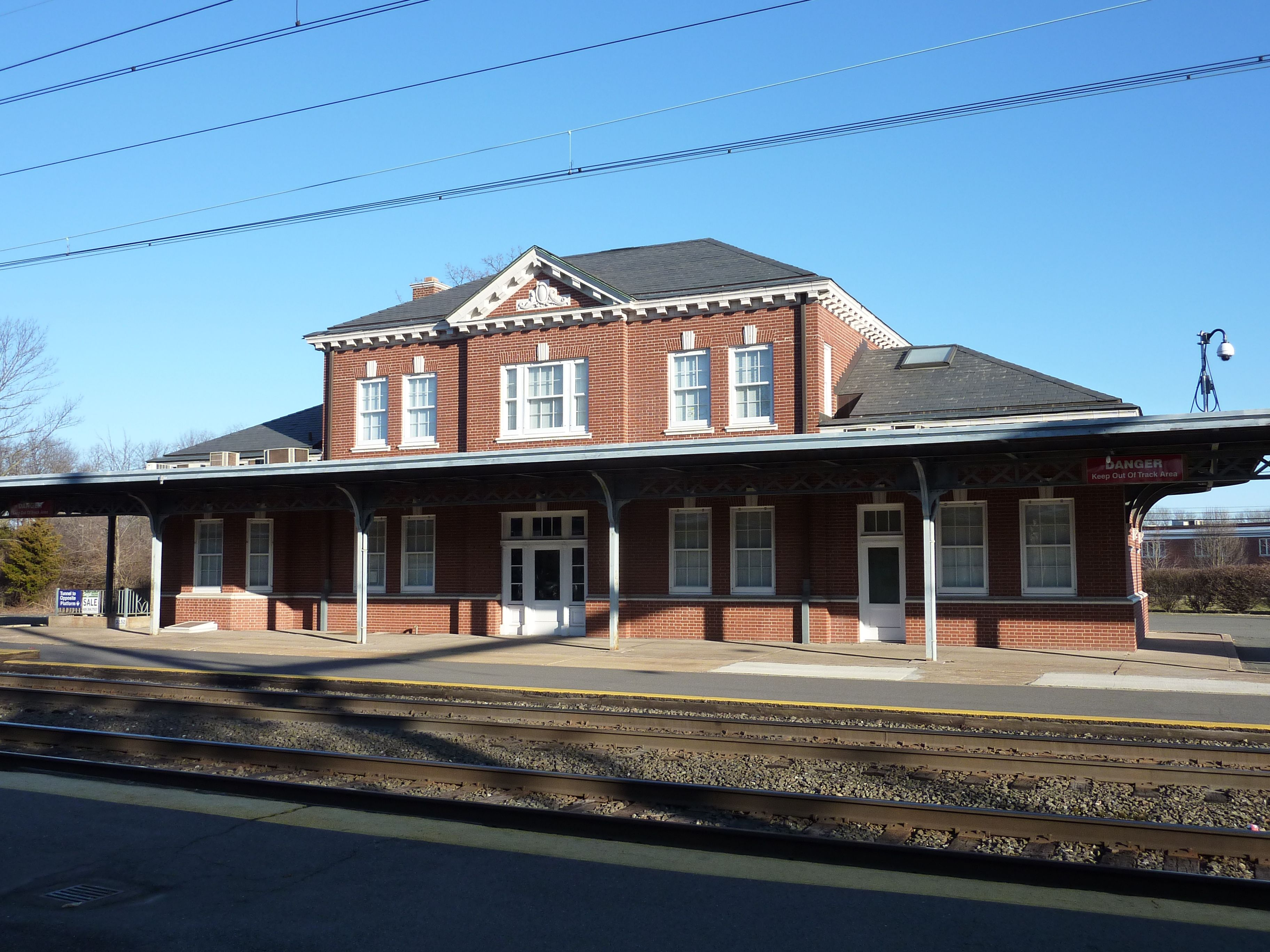
- The northbound station house from the tracks. Note: This building is now used by private offices and is not part of the operating station.
- Interactive map of West Trenton Station
- Area: 4 acres (1.6 ha)
- Built: 1929
- Architect: Clark Dillenbeck
- Architectural style: Colonial Revival, Others
- MPS: Operating Passenger Railroad Stations TR
- NRHP reference No.: 84004031
- Added to NRHP: June 22, 1984
Location

West Trenton is an active commuter railroad station in the West Trenton section of Ewing Township, Mercer County, New Jersey. Located on Railroad Place just off Sullivan Way (County Route 579), the station serves as the northern terminus of SEPTA Regional Rail's West Trenton Line from Center City, Philadelphia. Despite the two low-level side platforms at West Trenton station, SEPTA only uses the track and platform on the inbound side. due to limitations by CSX Transportation operating between Yardley and West Trenton. CSX freights operate towards Manville, bypassing the West Trenton station. The Colonial Revival station depots at West Trenton, built in 1929–1930, are both on the National Register of Historic Places.

Originally known as Trenton Junction, service at West Trenton station began on May 1, 1876 with the opening of the Delaware and Bound Brook Railroad. When the Reading Railroad reconstructed the station at Trenton Junction in 1929 and 1930, they renamed the station West Trenton. The pair of station depots at West Trenton opened on June 18, 1930 and the tracks were electrified the next year. Passenger service originally operated between Newark Penn Station and Philadelphia, but Conrail discontinued passenger service on the New Jersey side on December 3, 1982. NJ Transit has proposed reviving service on the New Jersey side as part of its West Trenton Line, which would terminate at this station.

== History ==
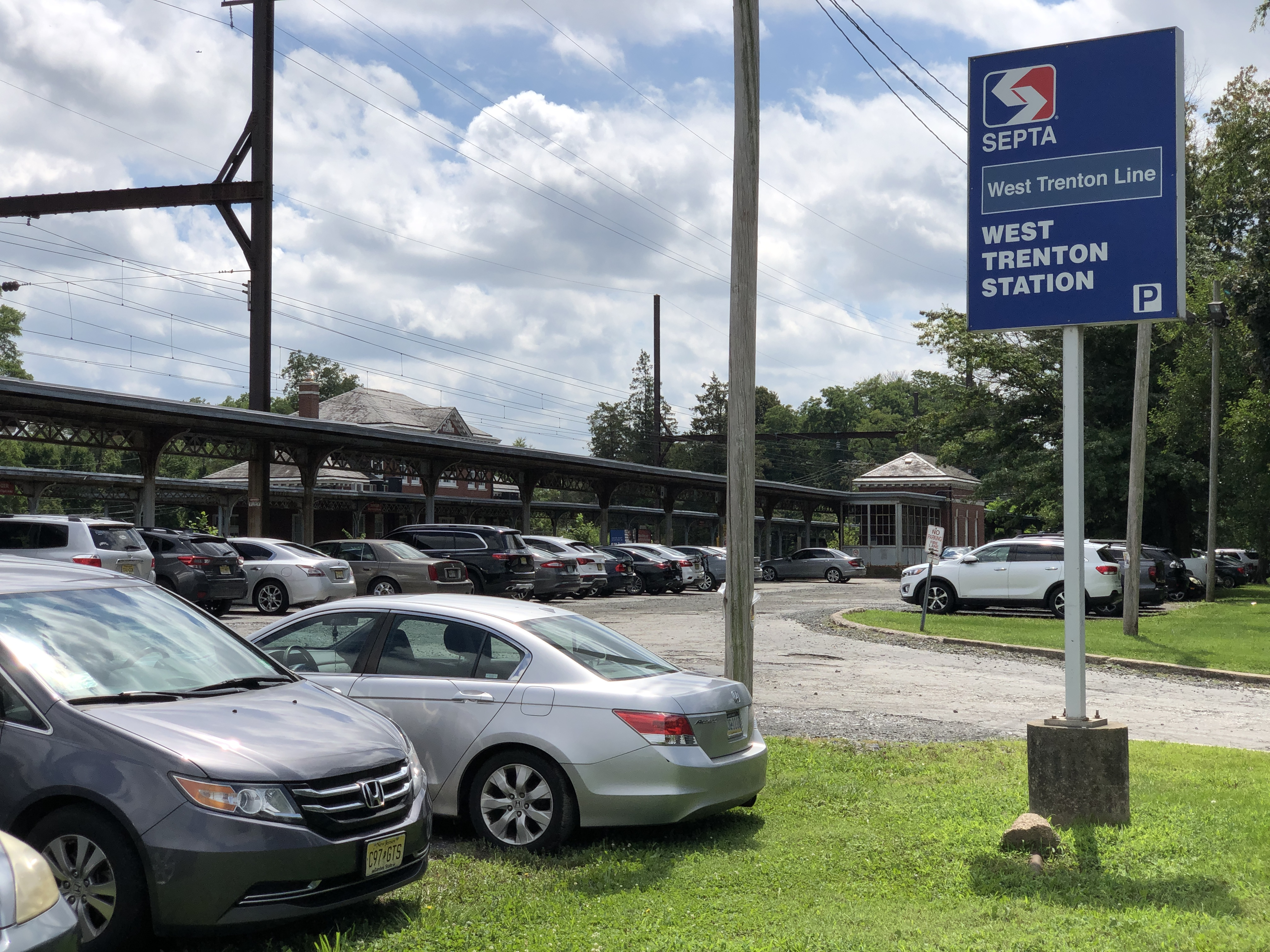
Main entrance to the West Trenton station

Originally built in 1929 by the Reading Railroad, it was acquired by Conrail and SEPTA in 1976 and used for diesel service to Newark, New Jersey until 1981. New Jersey Transit took over passenger service between here and Newark until November 1982, thus transforming the station into a terminus. It has been listed on the National Register of Historic Places since June 22, 1984. NRHP lists the northbound station house as the official address, which now consists of privately owned offices. There is an ongoing debate concerning a proposal to rename the station as "Ewing". This station is where the proposed New Jersey Transit West Trenton Line would terminate. As of August 25, 2015 as a result of the SEPTA and CSX separation between Woodbourne and West Trenton stations, the outbound platform was removed for the now CSX track to run around the SEPTA West Trenton yard and continue to Manville while all SEPTA traffic was diverted onto the Inbound track. Currently all SEPTA Service between Yardley and West Trenton operates on the Inbound track only.

The station was built in the Georgian Revival style as adapted for a medium-sized suburban station. It has a central two-story block constructed of brick and a hipped slate roof. The gable projects slightly on the east and west facades. Two one-story wings with slate roofs extend from the central block.

== See also ==
- Operating Passenger Railroad Stations Thematic Resource (New Jersey)
- West Trenton Railroad Bridge

== Bibliography ==
- Poor, Henry Varnum (1865). Manual of the Railroads of the United States: Volume 27. H.V. & H.W. Poor.
