= List of former SEPTA Regional Rail stations =

SEPTA Regional Rail System is the commuter rail division of the SEPTA. It contains 153 stations on 13 lines formerly owned by both the Pennsylvania Railroad and Reading Railroad. Almost all stations are located in the Commonwealth of Pennsylvania, with the exception of four stations in the State of Delaware and two in the State of New Jersey. Various stations have closed before and during the establishment of SEPTA as well as their regional rail division.

== Former stations ==
Station	Line	Municipality	County	Former railroad	Opened	Closed	Notes
52nd Street	Paoli/Thorndale Line; Cynwyd Line	Philadelphia	Philadelphia, PA	Pennsylvania	1902	August 23, 1980	
Allentown	Bethlehem Line	Allentown	Lehigh, PA	Lehigh Valley	1890	August 20, 1979	Part of SEPTA diesel service
Andalusia	Trenton Line	Bensalem Township	Bucks, PA	Pennsylvania	????	October 4, 1992	Located below Tennis Avenue
Auburn	Pottsville/Reading Line	Auburn	Schuylkill, PA	Reading	????	July 1, 1981	Part of SEPTA diesel service
Baldwin	Wilmington/Newark Line	Crum Lynne	Delaware, PA	Pennsylvania	????	October 4, 1981	
Barmouth	Cynwyd/Ivy Ridge Line	Lower Merion Township	Montgomery, PA	Pennsylvania	????	May 16, 1986	
Bethlehem	Bethlehem Line	Bethlehem	Lehigh, PA or Northampton, PA	Reading	????	June 30, 1981	Part of SEPTA diesel service
Birdsboro	Pottsville/Reading Line	Birdsboro	Berks, PA	Reading	????	July 1, 1981	Part of SEPTA diesel service
Bryn Athyn	Fox Chase/Newtown	Bryn Athyn	Montgomery, PA	Reading	1902	January 18, 1983	Part of SEPTA diesel service and short lived Fox Chase Rapid Transit Line. Currently a U.S. Post Office.
Center Valley	Bethlehem Line	Upper Saucon Township	Lehigh, PA	Reading	????	June 30, 1981	Part of SEPTA diesel service
Cheyney	Media/West Chester	Thornbury Township	Delaware, PA	Pennsylvania (PB&W)	1900	September 1986	
Churchville	Fox Chase/Newtown	Churchville	Bucks, PA	Reading	1878	January 18, 1983	Part of SEPTA diesel service and short lived Fox Chase Rapid Transit Line
Coatesville	Paoli/Parkesburg	Coatesville	Chester, PA	Pennsylvania	April 1990	November 10, 1996	In use by Amtrak
Columbia Avenue	Bethlehem Line, Pottsville/Reading Line, Warminster Line, Chestnut Hill East Line, Fox Chase Line, and West Trenton Line	North Philadelphia (Templetown)	Philadelphia, PA	Reading	1911	1992	Replaced by Temple University Station
County Line	Fox Chase/Newtown	Upper Southampton Township	Bucks, PA	Reading	????	January 18, 1983	Part of SEPTA diesel service and short lived Fox Chase Rapid Transit Line
Crescentville	Fox Chase/Newtown	Near Northeast Philadelphia	Philadelphia, PA	Reading	????	March 26, 1978	Part of SEPTA diesel service
Darlington	Media/West Chester	Middletown Township	Delaware, PA	Pennsylvania (PB&W)	????	October 4, 1981	
DeKalb Street	Manayunk/Norristown Line	Norristown	Montgomery, PA	Reading	1933	1984?	Replaced by Norristown Transportation Center
Fellwick	Lansdale/Doylestown Line	Whitemarsh Township, Pennsylvania (Ft. Washington)	Montgomery, PA	Reading	????	November 10, 1996	Between Oreland and Fort Washington
Fishers	Chestnut Hill East Line	North Philadelphia (Nicetown)	Philadelphia, PA	Reading	????	November 10, 1996	
Frankford Junction	Trenton Line	Kensington	Philadelphia, PA	Pennsylvania	1832	October 4, 1992	
Franklin Street	Pottsville/Reading Line	Reading	Berks, PA	Reading	????	July 1, 1981	Part of SEPTA diesel service
Fulmor	Warminster Line	Upper Moreland Township	Montgomery, PA	Reading	????	November 10, 1996	
George School	Fox Chase/Newtown	Middletown Township	Bucks, PA	Reading	1905	January 18, 1983	Part of SEPTA diesel service and short lived Fox Chase Rapid Transit Line
Glen Mills	Media/West Chester	Glen Mills	Delaware, PA	Pennsylvania (WC&P)	1858	September 1986	
Glen Riddle	Media/West Chester	Middletown Township (possibly Media)	Delaware, PA	Pennsylvania (PW&B)		September 1986	
Hamburg	Pottsville/Reading Line	West Hamburg	Berks, PA	Reading	????	July 1, 1981	Part of SEPTA diesel service
Hellertown	Bethlehem Line	Hellertown	Northampton, PA	Reading	????	June 30, 1981	Part of SEPTA diesel service
Holland	Fox Chase/Newtown Line	Northampton Township	Bucks, PA	Reading	????	January 18, 1983	Part of SEPTA diesel service and short lived Fox Chase Rapid Transit Line
Huntingdon Valley	Fox Chase/Newtown Line	Lower Moreland Township	Montgomery, PA	Reading	????	January 18, 1983	Part of SEPTA diesel service and short lived Fox Chase Rapid Transit Line
Ivy Ridge Upper Level	Cynwyd/Ivy Ridge Line (Schuylkill Branch)	Northwest Philadelphia	Philadelphia, PA	Pennsylvania	1980	1986	Upper Level of existing Ivy Ridge Station on the Manayunk/Norristown Line
Ivy Rock	Pottsville/Reading Line	Plymouth Township	Montgomery, PA	Reading	????	????	Part of SEPTA diesel service
Lamokin Street	Wilmington/Newark Line	Chester	Delaware, PA	Pennsylvania	????	2003	Terminus of former Chester Creek Branch
Leesport	Pottsville/Reading Line	Leesport	Berks, PA	Reading	????	1979	Part of SEPTA diesel service
Lenni	Media/West Chester Line	Middletown Township	Delaware, PA	Pennsylvania	????	September 1986	Terminus of former Chester Creek Branch
Linfield	Pottsville/Reading Line	Royersford	Montgomery, PA	Reading	????	March 26, 1978	Part of SEPTA diesel service
Locksley	Media/West Chester Line	Thornbury Township	Delaware, PA	Pennsylvania	????	October 4, 1981	
Logan	Lansdale/Doylestown Line; Warminster Line; West Trenton Line	North Philadelphia	Philadelphia, PA	Reading	????	October 4, 1992	
Manayunk West	Cynwyd/Ivy Ridge Line	Manayunk	Philadelphia, PA	Pennsylvania	1834	1986	
Mohrsville	Pottsville/Reading Line	Mohrsville	Berks, PA	Reading	????	July 1, 1981	Part of SEPTA diesel service
Mogees	Manayunk/Norristown Line	Plymouth Township	Montgomery, PA	Reading	????	October 4, 1992	
Newark Penn (New Jersey)	West Trenton Line Extension	Newark	Essex, NJ	Pennsylvania	1935		Part of SEPTA diesel service; Taken over by New Jersey Transit north of West Trenton until 1982. NJT-WT ends 1983.
Newtown	Fox Chase/Newtown Line	Newtown	Bucks, PA	Reading	1873	January 18, 1983	Part of Fox Chase Rapid Transit Line.
Nicetown	Chestnut Hill East Line	Nicetown	Philadelphia, PA	Reading		November 14, 1988	SEPTA closed the Nicetown station on November 14, 1988 after a fire damaged the station. At the time of closure, the station had one single passenger on average.
Parkesburg	Paoli/Parkesburg Line	Parkesburg	Chester, PA	Pennsylvania	April 1990	November 10, 1996	In use by Amtrak
Phoenixville	Pottsville/Reading Line	Phoenixville	Chester, PA	Reading	????	July 26, 1981	Part of SEPTA diesel service
Pottstown	Pottsville/Reading Line	Pottstown	Montgomery, PA	Reading	1928	July 26, 1981	Part of SEPTA diesel service; NRHP listed since January 12, 1984.
Pottsville	Pottsville/Reading Line	Pottsville	Schuylkill, PA	Reading	????	July 1, 1981	Part of SEPTA diesel service
Quakertown	Bethlehem Line	Quakertown	Bucks, PA	Reading	????	July 26, 1981	Part of SEPTA diesel service
Reading Terminal	Lansdale/Doylestown Line; Norristown Line; Warminster Line; Chestnut Hill East Line; Fox Chase/Newtown Line; West Trenton Line	Center City	Philadelphia, PA	Reading	January 29, 1893	November 6, 1984	
Royersford	Pottsville/Reading Line	Royersford	Montgomery, PA	Reading	1931	July 26, 1981	Part of SEPTA diesel service
Schuylkill Haven	Pottsville/Reading Line	Schuylkill Haven	Schuylkill, PA	Reading	????	July 1, 1981	Part of SEPTA diesel service; Currently the Borough Hall.
Shawmont	Manayunk/Norristown Line	Northwest Pennsylvania	Philadelphia, PA	Reading	1834	November 10, 1996	
Shoemakersville	Pottsville/Reading Line	Shoemakersville	Berks, PA	Reading	????	July 1, 1981	Part of SEPTA diesel service;
Southampton	Fox Chase/Newtown Line	Upper Southampton Township	Bucks, PA	Reading	1892	January 18, 1983	Part of Fox Chase Rapid Transit Line
Spring Garden Street	Lansdale/Doylestown Line; Norristown Line; Warminster Line; Chestnut Hill East Line; Fox Chase/Newtown Line; West Trenton Line	Lower North Philadelphia (Poplar)	Philadelphia, PA	Reading	1893	1984	
Tioga	Chestnut Hill East Line	North Philadelphia	Philadelphia, PA	Reading	????	????	
Valley Forge	Pottsville/Reading Line	Valley Forge	Montgomery, PA	Reading	1911	July 26, 1981	Part of SEPTA diesel service
Walnut Hill	Fox Chase/Newtown Line	Abington Township	Montgomery, PA	Reading	????	January 18, 1983	Part of Fox Chase Rapid Transit Line
West Chester	Media/West Chester	West Chester	Chester, PA	Pennsylvania (WC&P)	1875	September 1986	
West Chester University	Media/West Chester	West Chester	Chester, PA	Pennsylvania (WC&P)	????	September 1986	Originally "Nields Street." Served West Chester University
Westmoreland	Chestnut Hill West	Northwest Philadelphia	Philadelphia, PA	Pennsylvania (PG&CH)	????	October 28, 1994	
Westtown	Media/West Chester	Thornbury Township	Chester, PA	Pennsylvania (WC&P)	1859	September 1986	
Williamson School	Media/West Chester	Media	Delaware, PA	Pennsylvania (WC&P)	1888	September 1986	
Wissinoming	Trenton Line	Northeast Philadelphia	Philadelphia, PA	Pennsylvania	????	November 9, 2003	
