= Bryn Athyn station =

Railway station in Pennsylvania, United States

Bryn Athyn
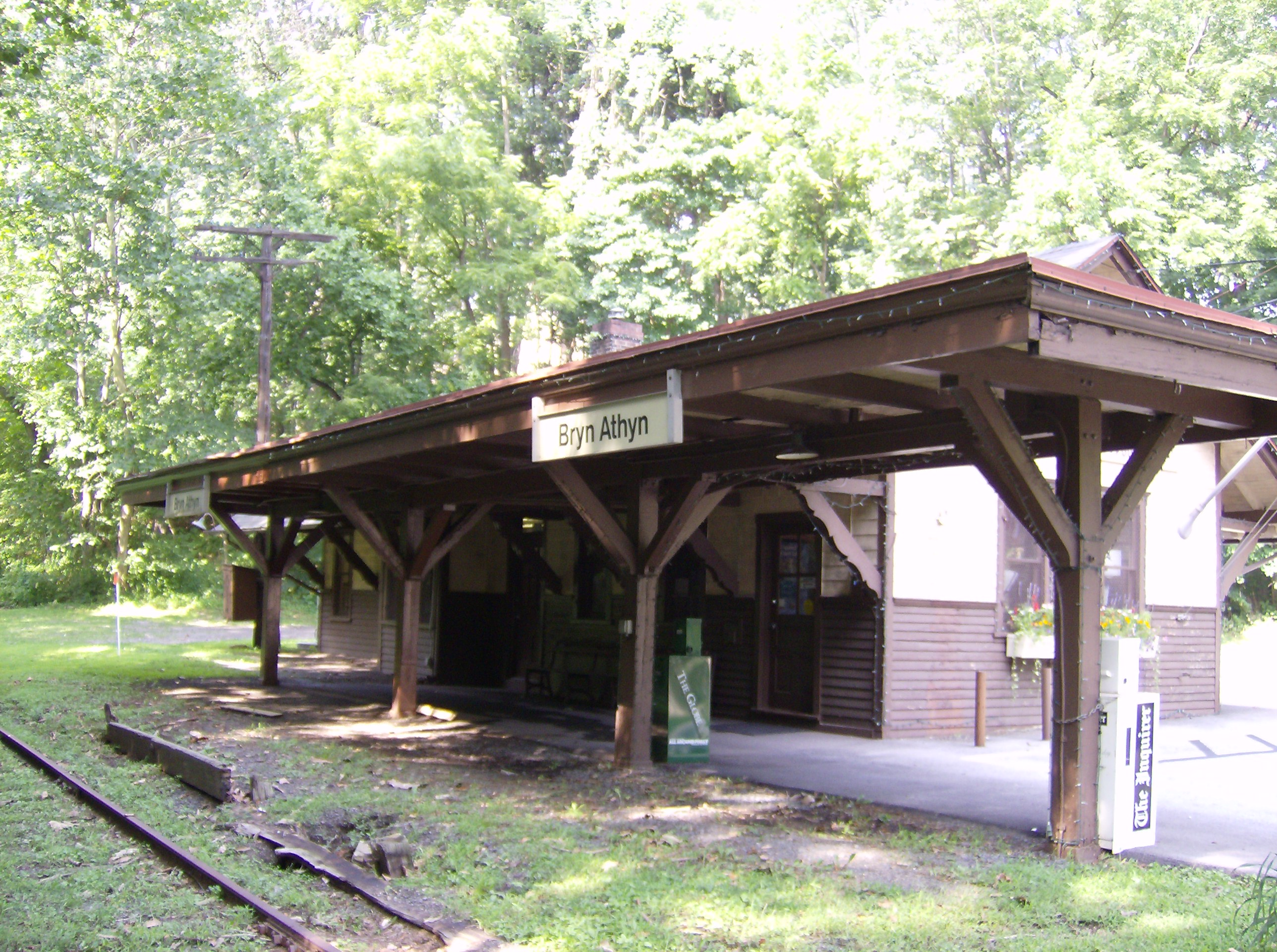
- Bryn Athyn station, 2006

General information
- Location: 2586 Fetters Mill Road; Bryn Athyn, Pennsylvania 19009
- Coordinates: 40.1302°N 75.0708°W
- Owner: SEPTA
- Platforms: 1 side platform
- Tracks: 1

Construction
- Parking: 20 spaces

History
- Opened: 1902 (RDG)
- Closed: January 18, 1983

Former services
| Preceding station | SEPTA | Following station |
|---|---|---|
| Huntingdon Valley toward Reading Terminal | Newtown Line | County Line toward Newtown |
| Preceding station | Reading Railroad | Following station |
| Huntingdon Valley toward Philadelphia | Newtown Branch | Woodmont toward Newtown |
Location

Bryn Athyn station is a former railroad station in Bryn Athyn, Pennsylvania. Built by the Reading Railroad, it later served SEPTA's Fox Chase/Newtown Line. It is located on Fetters Mill Road near the Pennypack Creek. The station is a contributing property to the Fetter's Mill Village Historic District.

== History ==
Bryn Athyn station, built in 1902, was a stop on the Reading Railroad's Newtown Line. On December 5, 1921, the stretch of single track between the Bryn Athyn and Southampton stations was the site of the Reading Railroad's deadliest accident at that time. Two trains met in a head-on collision in a narrow gully after the signals for the northbound train were ignored. The crash killed 26 and injured 70 train passengers and crewmen. The route later became a part of SEPTA's Fox Chase Rapid Transit Line. The station and all of those north of Fox Chase were closed on January 18, 1983.

In addition, a labor dispute began within the SEPTA organization when the transit operator inherited 1,700 displaced employees from Conrail. SEPTA insisted on using transit operators from the Broad Street Subway to operate Fox Chase–Newtown diesel trains, while Conrail requested that railroad engineers run the service. When a federal court ruled that SEPTA had to use Conrail employees to offer job assurance, SEPTA cancelled Fox Chase–Newtown trains. Service in the diesel-only territory north of Fox Chase was cancelled at that time, and Bryn Athyn station still appears in publicly posted tariffs.

Though rail service was initially replaced with a Fox Chase–Newtown shuttle bus, patronage remained light, and service was later cancelled. Surviving trackage was replaced with the Pennypack Trail rail trail.

== Station building ==
The building is currently used as a post office and community building. The former station canopy retains SEPTA signage installed in 1984 — one year after train service had ended.
