= List of rail accidents (1920–1929) =

This is a list of rail accidents from 1920 to 1929.

== 1920 ==
- March 9 – United Kingdom – A Lancashire and Yorkshire Railway freight train separates at Pendlebury, Lancashire. The rear portion runs away, pushing the banking locomotive downhill where it is derailed by catch points.
- March 14 – United States – Bellows Falls, Vermont The crew of a southbound freight incorrectly reads the train order, confusing "Bartonsville" for "Bellows Falls". Instead of waiting at Bartonsville, they instead proceed south, and collide with a northbound passenger train at Williams River. At least six people are killed.
- March – United States – Deerfield, Illinois. A locomotive boiler explodes killing one and injuring three.
- April 12 – United States – New York City: On the 6th Av. elevated line of the IRT company, one train takes a crossover into a track occupied by another knocking one car down to the street. One person is killed and 12 injured.
- April 24 - British India - A collision on the Oudh and Rohilkhand Railway, east of Delhi, kills at least 150 as the wreckage is set alight by the gas installation aboard and burns fiercely. After the fire, pools of molten silver are found in the vicinity "resulting from the melting of the hoards of rupees many of the Indians carried."
- May 3 – France – A special Riviera Express running from Nice on the PLM railway during a partial strike derails at Les Laumes – Alesia station. Two people were killed: the regular driver and an engineering student who was learning the job to substitute for striking drivers.
- May 17 – British India – A passenger train starting from Bombay (now Mumbai) collides with a freight train, killing 23 and injuring 17, all in third class.
- May 20 – Spain – A freight train and a passenger train collide at Neon Daroston, killing 40 people.
- May 25 - United States - La Joya, New Mexico - Santa Fe passenger train No. 808 derails 52 miles (84 km) south of Albuquerque, on a track on ground made soft by high water. The fireman and engineer are killed and about 30 passengers injured. "All of the cars are reported to be on their sides in the water. A special train with doctors and nurses had been ordered from Seccorro [sic], and the wrecker ordered from Belen, which will also take all available doctors from there. The train left El Paso this morning."
- July 16 – Spain – A freight and passenger train collide between Barcelona and Tortosa, killing twenty people.
- October 7 – British India – During a labour dispute on the Madras Railway, the Madras-Bangalore Mail (which would now be Chennai-Bengaluru) derails due to a sabotaged track, killing 13 people and injuring 15; 60 coolies are arrested.
- October 8 – Italy – The Italian State Railways express to Milan is stopped by signals on the bridge from Venice to Mestre, but the signals behind are not set. A train from Trieste crashes into the rear killing 25 and injuring 20.
- October 9 – France – At Houilles in the Paris suburbs, unbraked cars separate from the rear of a freight train, roll downhill and derail, blocking the adjacent track with wreckage which was struck by a suburban train killing 47.
- October 27 – Romania – At Lufany, an inexperienced railwayman's error cause two passenger trains to collide, killing about 50 and injuring 200 or more.
- October – Russia – At Pogranichny, the mail train from Vladivostok to Harbin, China wrecks killing about 100.
- December 14 – British India – A mail train and goods train collide at Bommidi, killing 30 people and injuring 35.

== 1921 ==
- January 26 – United Kingdom – Abermule train collision: a head-on collision kills 17 people after improper, confused procedures resulted in the tablet from an incoming train being returned to its driver, who did not read it and assumed it was the following tablet that would give him permission to depart.
- January – Russia – On a mixed train from Novgorod, a consignment of flammable liquid explodes at Luga, killing 68 people. "Benzine Tank Explodes; 68 Persons Are Killed", Oklahoma City (OK) Times, January 18, 1921, p. 2
- February 13 – United States – More than 50 people were injured in Brooklyn, New York when two Long Island Rail Road trains collide after one train operator missed a stop signal.
- February 27 – United States – Porter, Indiana: Over 37 people were killed when the Canadian on the Michigan Central Railroad and the Interstate Express on the New York Central Railroad crash at a cross track. The Michigan Central train, bound for Toronto, Montreal, and Quebec City, overshot a block signal and was derailed by a derailed device. The New York Central train crashed into the already wrecked Michigan Central train at 60 mph (97 km/h).
- April 1 – United States – In Georgetown, Kentucky an unknown man was killed by a train. In June 2017 the John Doe was identified as Frank Haynes of Bronston, Kentucky
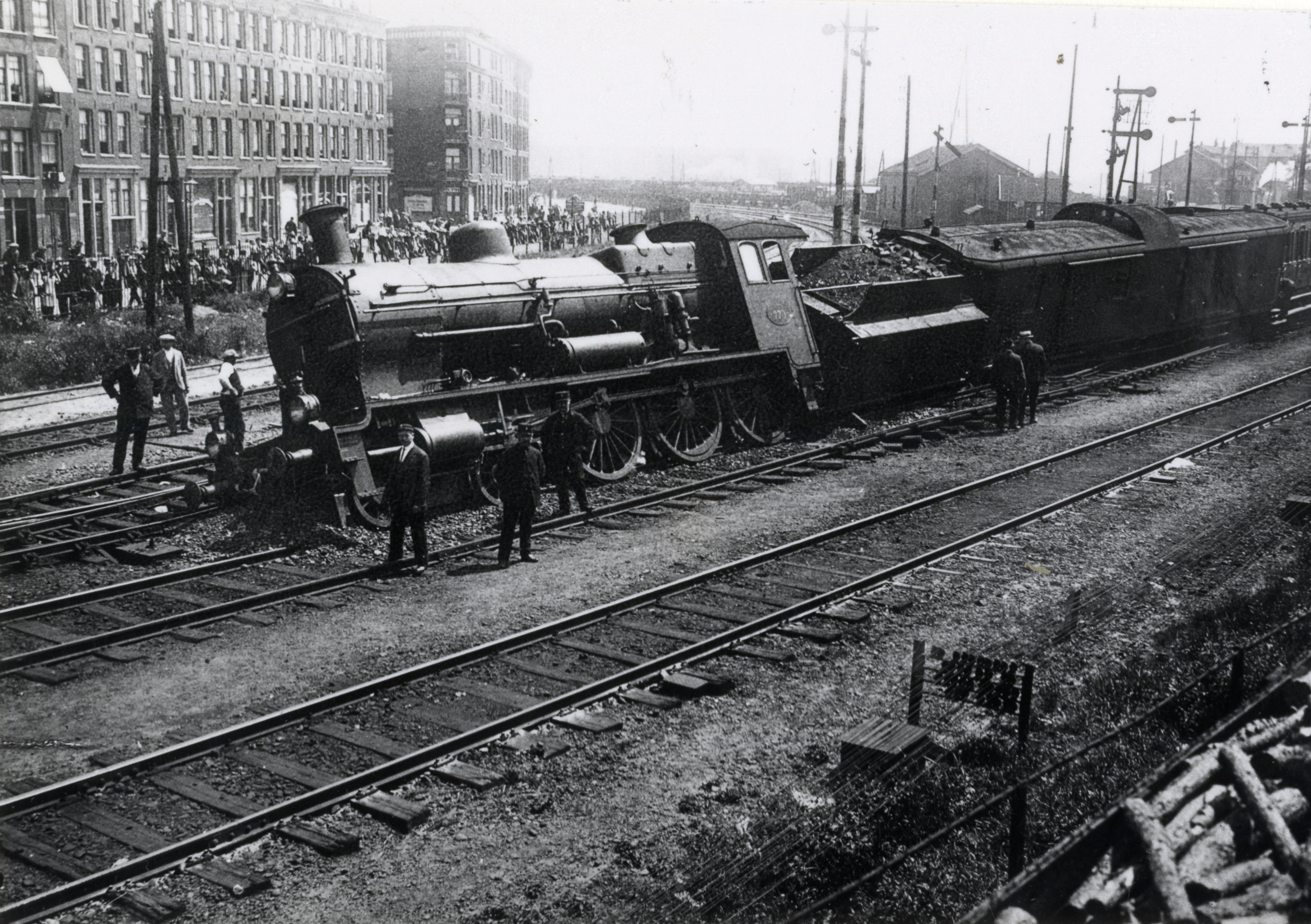
- Amsterdam Weesperpoort
  June 18 - Netherlands - A passenger train is derailed at Amsterdam Weesperpoort.
- June 25 – France – On a bridge over the Ancre River at Beaumont-Hamel, on the Chemins de Fer du Nord, a derailment began with the luggage van at the rear of the train and spreads to the rear three passenger cars, which fall down an embankment; 25 people died and 60 were injured.
- June 25 – British India – Near Amroha on the Delhi-to-Moradabad line of the Oudh and Rohilkhand Railway, a 150-yard (140 m) length of the line is breached by flooding within the space of an hour. The locomotive and two front cars of the next train fall into the water, killing 42 people.
- July 8 – United Kingdom – A 12-car Great Eastern Railway goods train without continuous brakes is running north on the East London Railway when a coupling breaks. Four goods wagons and the rear brake van separate from the train, and run back southward, downhill. Realizing this, the guard in the brake van applies brakes, but not in time. As the runaway cars approach Wapping station, they cross a track circuit boundary backwards, and the next northbound train receives a false clear signal. This is a New Cross to Shoreditch passenger train of the Metropolitan Railway. The resulting collision kills two railwaymen injures 16 people.
- July 25 – British India – A mail train from Rangoon (now Yangon) to Mandalay, both now in Myanmar, about 100 miles (160 km) into its journey, collides at night with a goods train between Tawwi and Pein Za Loke; 104 people are killed and 48 injured.
- August 8 – United Kingdom – At Selby railway station, a sidelong collision of two passenger trains caused by driver error; 17 injured.
- August 27 – Italy – On the Italian State Railways, a train from Ladispoli to Rome collides with a shunting locomotive; 29 are killed and over 100 injured.
- September 10 – France – On the PLM railway, the section from Bourg-en-Bresse to Lyon had not yet been reopened after one of two tracks was removed to repair World War I damage elsewhere. Consequently a train from Strasbourg to Lyon uses a side track at Les Échets, but runs too fast over the switch and derails killing 38.
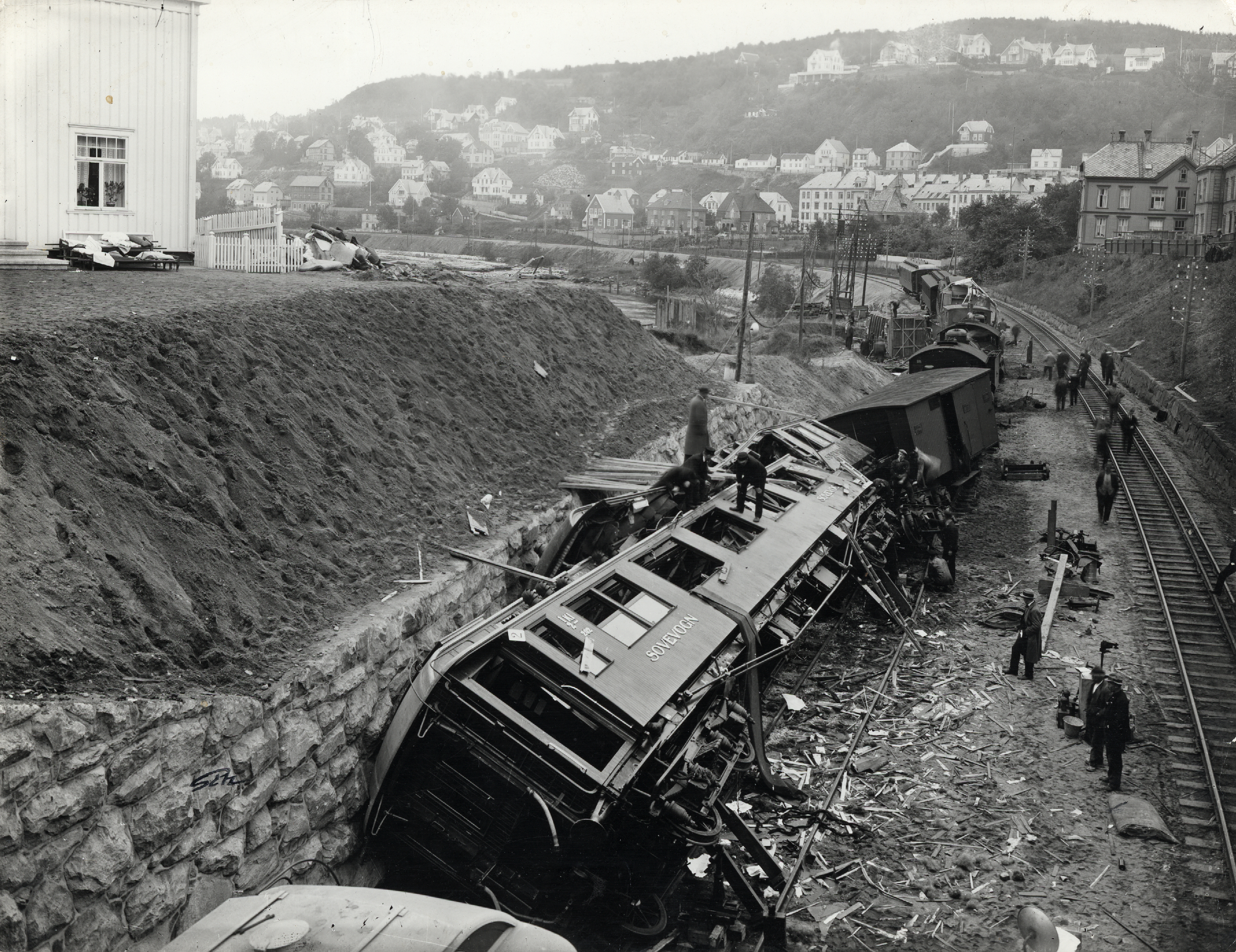
- Nidareid train disaster
  September 18 – Norway – Nidareid train disaster in Trondheim. Confusion and unfortunate circumstances lead to a head-on collision between two passenger trains killing six.
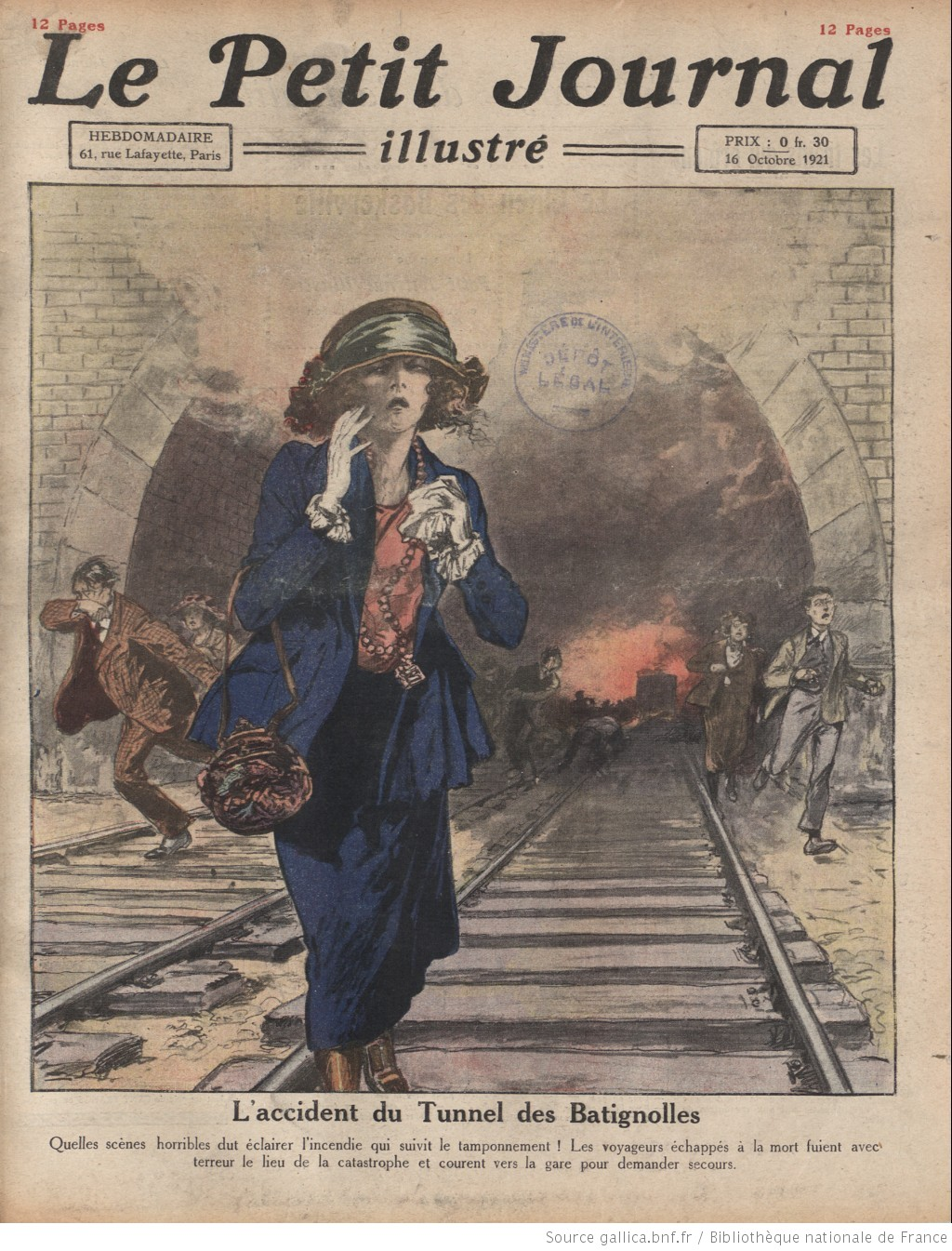
- Batignolles Tunnel October 1921
  October 5 – France – Two passenger trains collide due to a signalman's error in the Batignolles Tunnel, Paris; at least 28 people were killed in the ensuing fire.
- November 19 – British India – 64 Mappila prisoners die of asphyxiation while being transported on a prison car with its ventilation blocked by paint,
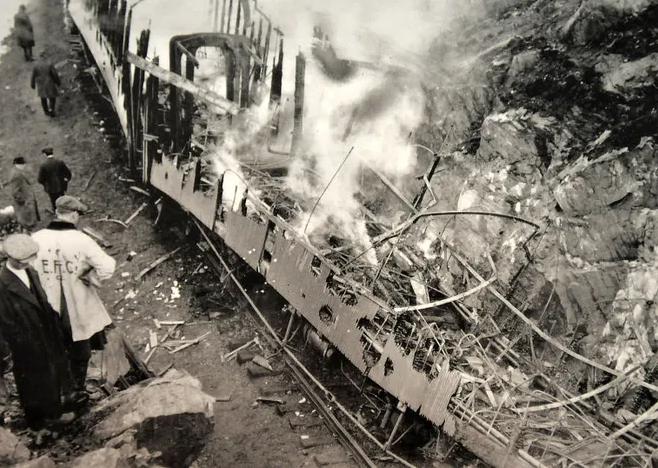
- Bryn Athyn Train Wreck
  December 5 – United States – Bryn Athyn Train Wreck in Woodmont, Pennsylvania: Two local passenger trains on the Philadelphia and Reading Railway collide and catch fire, killing 27 people after signals were ignored.

== 1922 ==
- March 23 – United States – Azusa, California: A passenger train derails after hitting one of the city's steamrollers. The engineer and fireman are killed while the steamroller driver jumps to save his own life.
- May 1 – United States – Alton, Illinois, a Chicago and Alton Railroad passenger train strikes a fire engine on its way to a fire, at a grade crossing at 9th and Piasa Streets. The driver and officer on the fire engine seat are injured while two other firefighters jump off. The fire engine, only a year old, was squeezed between the moving passenger train and a parked coal car, and was beyond repair. The broken pieces of the fire engine had to be hauled away in a truck, and a new fire engine had to be purchased to replace it.
- June 27 – Germany – Berlin: Following a huge demonstration in the Lustgarten against the assassins of Walther Rathenau, the suburban trains are so overwhelmed with passengers that some people ride outside on the running boards, and dozens of them on one train are struck when a door on another train swings open between stations. Casualties were reported as 29 killed and 60 injured and 15 killed and over 100 injured.
- July 2 – United States – 1922 Winslow Junction train derailment: On the Philadelphia and Reading Railway's Atlantic City Railroad, at shortly before 11:30pm, Train 33 with Philadelphia and Reading Railway Engine No. 349 speeds through an open switch at approximately 90 mph (140 km/h) and derails, killing seven and injuring 89.
- July 11 – Spain – Paredes de Nava: A head-on collision between the Asturias Mail and an express from Galicia kills 32, including both engine crews, and seriously injures 19.
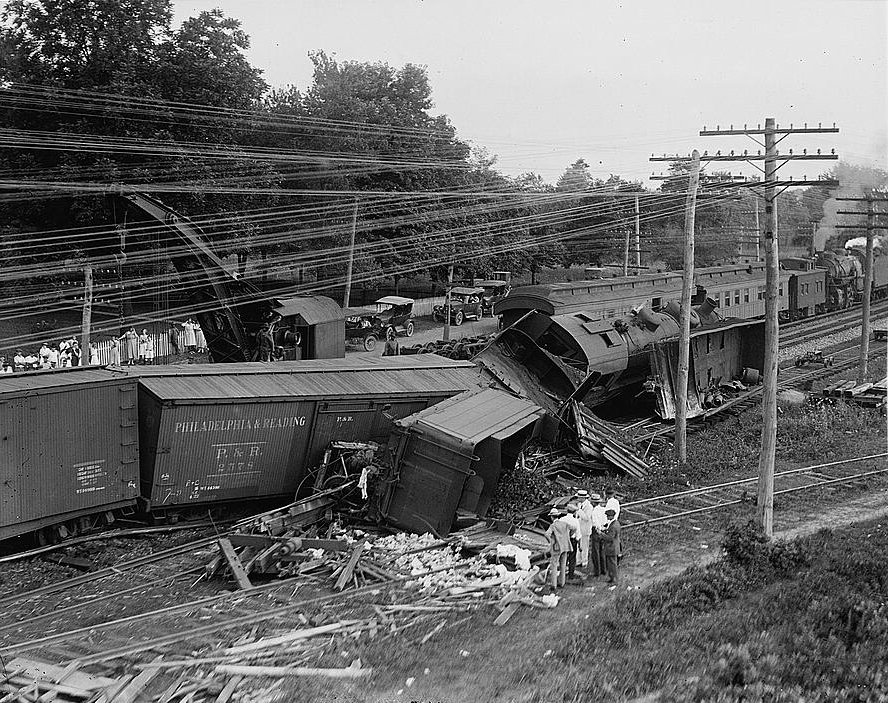
- July 31, 1922 wreck at Laurel, Maryland
  July 31 – United States – Laurel, Maryland: Two freight trains collide; one engineer slightly injured.
- August 1 – France – Miélan: Two trains carrying pilgrims from Moulins to Lourdes collide when the first one stalls climbing a hill and then runs backwards, apparently due to a brake system failure. Forty people are killed.
- August 5 – United States – Missouri Pacific Railroad train 32, a local passenger train northbound from Hoxie, Arkansas, to St. Louis, was told at Riverside to proceed 7 miles (11 km) to Wickes, Missouri and take the siding while northbound express train 4 (from Texas to St. Louis) and southbound express 1 (the Sunshine Special from St. Louis to Texas) go past. Halfway there, it stopped for water at Sulphur Springs, Missouri. Train 4, while in motion, received an order to stop at Cliff Cave (after Wickes) to let southbound train 1 past. While reading the order, the engineer missed seeing the block signal at Sulphur Springs and crashed into train 32 killing 34 and injuring about 170 injured, mostly in the local, in the worst rail accident ever in Missouri.
- August 21 – United Kingdom – A South Eastern and Chatham Railway passenger train leaves Milton Range Halt, Kent against signals and collides with another train killing three.
- September 22 – United States – The southbound Shore Line Limited, having departed twenty minutes late from Montalvo, California, crashed into a northbound local train; the engineer of the Limited and fireman of the local were killed in the collision with the rest of the crew and passengers sustaining minor injuries.
- December 4 – United States – Near Shenandoah, Iowa: Of 150 passengers aboard Wabash Railroad train No. 14, 130 "were more or less seriously injured" when the several cars derail six miles (9.7 km) north of Shenandoah, at 8:50 pm. Three day coaches and smokers were turned over on their sides while the engine and baggage car remained on the rails.
- December 13 – United States – Humble, Texas: Traveling at moderate speed, Houston East & West Texas Railway passenger train No. 28, bound for Shreveport, sideswipes a light engine at Humble Station breaking off the boiler check valve on the engine; twenty-two are killed and 11 injured when high-pressure steam enters the first three passenger coaches. The cause is attributed to watchman error.

== 1923 ==
- January 14 – British Ceylon (now Sri Lanka) – Anuradhapura: The Jaffa Mail wrecks at a washout during severe storms; the locomotive, tender, brake van, travelling post office, and one passenger car fall into the floodwaters, killing 39 people.
- February 13 – United Kingdom – A London and North Eastern Railway express passenger train overruns signals and runs into the rear of a freight train at Retford, Nottinghamshire killing three people.
- February 18 – France – A train from Paris to Strasbourg on the Chemins de fer de l'Est collides with a freight train, killing 27 people.
- March 30 – United States – Columbus, Ohio, A westbound Big Four Flyer en route from Boston to Cincinnati hits an automobile at a grade crossing killing the 3 occupants of the car, the engineer, the fireman, and an editor for the Warren Democrat; another 14 were injured.
- April 15 – United Kingdom – A Great Western Railway freight train collides head-on with a passenger train at Curry Rivel, Somerset due to a signalman's error injuring nine.
- July 2 – Romania – At Vinty-Leanca, between Ploești and Bezeu (now Ploiești and Buzău), a shunter's error diverts a mail train from Bucharest to Jassy into a siding where it crashes into a stationary goods train killing 63 people and injuring 100 injured.
- July 3 – United States – A passenger train in New Mexico derails killing both of the engineers and both of the firemen, and injuring 45.
- July 5 – United Kingdom – A freight train and an express passenger train collide at Diggle, Yorkshire, killing four people.
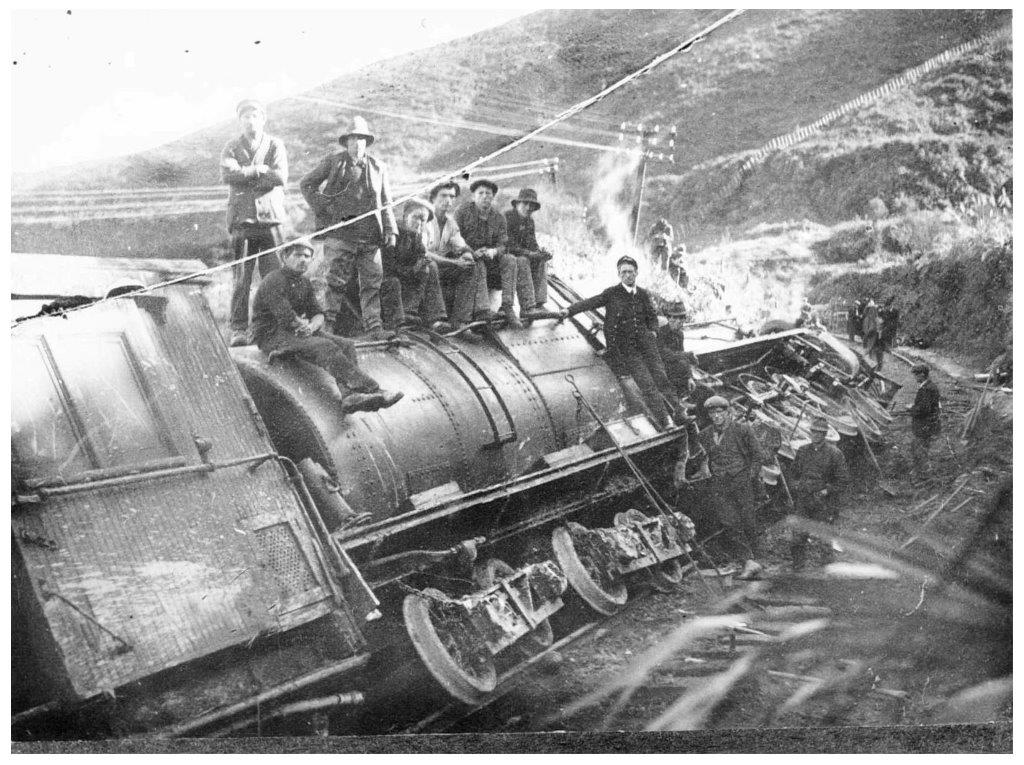
- Ongarue railway disaster
  July 6 – New Zealand – Ongarue railway disaster: A southbound express runs into a mudslide killing 17. A railway worker in charge of a gang also dies at the scene of cerebral haemorrhage – verified from news reports of the day.
- July 31 – Germany – A night express from Hamburg is run in two sections due to a heavy passenger load. At Kreiensen, between Hildesheim and Göttingen, the advance section stops due to engine trouble, and the driver of the following section missed seeing a signal because of something in his eye and crashes into the rear of the leading section. The resulting crash and fire kills 47 people.
- August 13 – United States – Colorado and Southern Railway train 609 collides head-on with Santa Fe train 6 in Fowler, Colorado, killing 5 people and injuring at least 5.
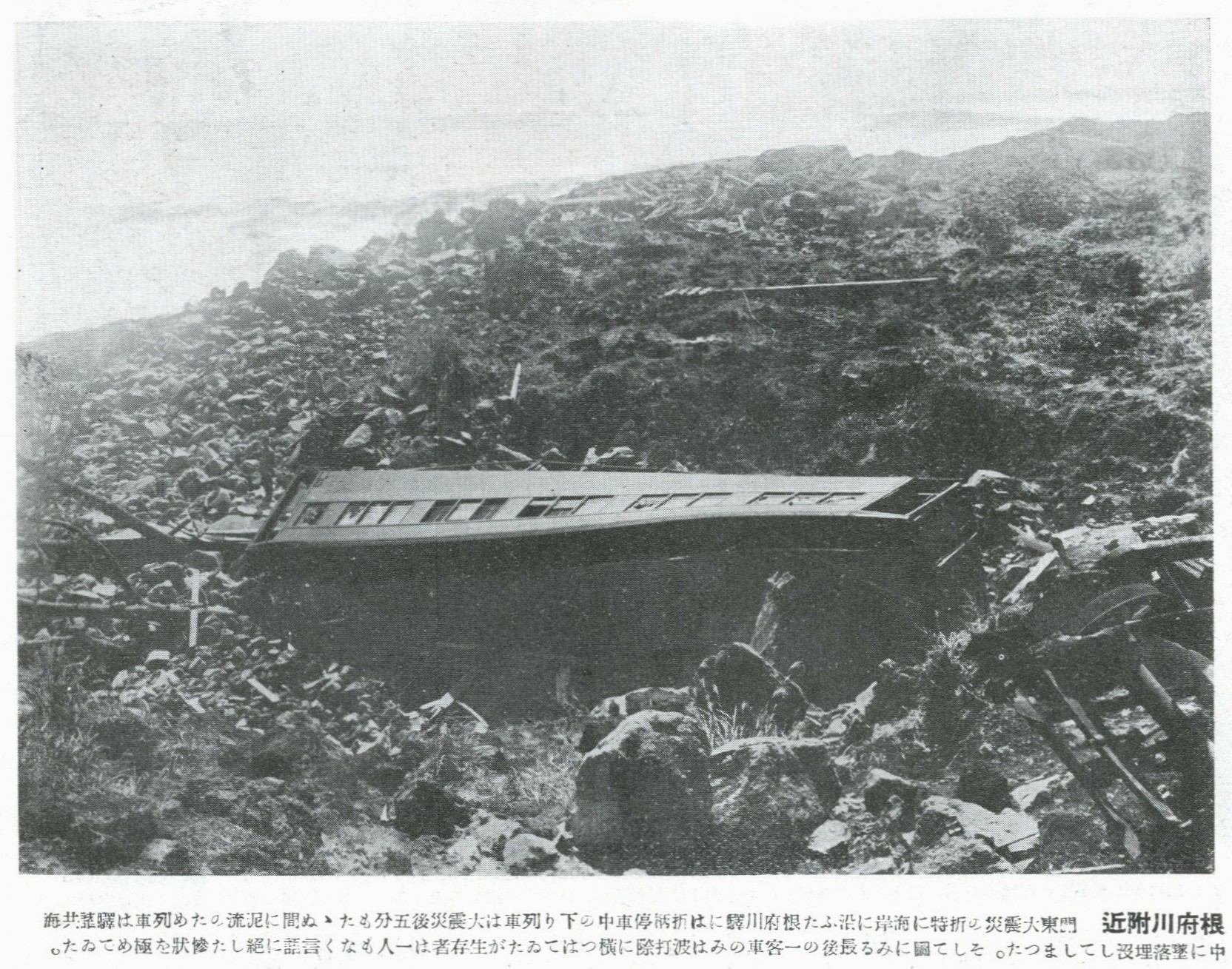
- 1923 Nebukawa Train crash by Great Kanto earthquake
  September 1 – Japan – Nebukawa Station accident: A landslide caused by the 1923 Great Kantō earthquake hits Nebukawa Station and an approaching train. 112 passengers were killed and thirteen injured.
- September 8 – USSR – An express train derails at Omsk killing 82 and injuring 150.
- September 27 – United States – Glenrock train wreck: A Chicago, Burlington and Quincy Railroad passenger train falls through a bridge washaway at Cole Creek, killing 30 of the train's 66 passengers. This was the worst railroad accident in Wyoming's history.
- October 27 – Canada – Canadian Pacific Railway train 4, seven colonist passenger cars derail near Savanne, Ontario as a result of a broken rail.
- December 23 – United Kingdom – A London and North Eastern Railway express passenger train overruns signals at Belford, Northumberland and collides with a locomotive.

== 1924 ==
- March 14 – India – Near Bareilly, on the Oudh and Rohilkhand Railway, a tropical cyclone blew five cars of a train off a bridge leaving two submerged in a river. One early report said 18 bodies were found before the submerged cars were searched; another report estimated forty to fifty total dead.
- April 23 – Switzerland – Two passenger trains collided head-on at Bellinzona due to a pointsman's error and the driver of one of the trains passing a danger signal. A lack of interlocking was a major contributory factor. Fifteen people were killed.
- April 26 – United Kingdom – A London, Midland and Scottish Railway electric multiple unit overruns signals and crashes into the rear of an excursion train at Euston station, London.
- May 2 – USSR – On its inaugural run, the Lenin Express from Odessa to Moscow derails, possibly due to sabotage, and several cars fell down an embankment. Many people were killed and injured but nothing was reported in the Soviet papers.
- July 28 – United Kingdom – A passenger train overruns signals and collides with another at Haymarket station, Edinburgh, Lothian killing five.
- August 19 – French West Africa – Due to a flood, the Paporah Bridge on the Dakar–Niger Railway collapses with a train on it, killing 29 people.
- August 19 – British India – At Montgomery (now Sahiwal, Pakistan) on the North Western State Railway, two trains collide, killing 107 people and injuring 104; the assistant stationmaster of an adjacent station was arrested for criminal negligence.
- October – USSR – On the line from Moscow to Ivanovo and Vasenensk, a mixed train carrying passengers and gasoline is destroyed by fire. It was said that of 200 people on board only 27 survived, but the Soviet authorities suppressed the story.
- November 3 – United Kingdom – Lytham rail crash: The lead tyre of a locomotive suddenly fractures causing the train to derail and strike a bridge and a signal box killing fourteen.

== 1925 ==
- January 13 – Germany – An express train from Berlin to Cologne suddenly encounters fog and the driver passes signals without realizing it. The train crashes into the rear of a Ruhr local standing at Herne, smashing through the fourth-class cars at the rear; 32 people were killed and 57 injured, all on the local.
- January 13 – Germany – On the same day (and in fact at almost the same time) as the Herne disaster, a similar collision occurs at Hattingen in the Ruhr killing three and injuring twelve.
- January 30 – Ireland – Owencarrow Viaduct disaster: - A train is blown off a viaduct in Donegal in winds approaching 120 mph (190 km/h) killing four.
- February 27 - Canada - A Canadian Pacific Railway passenger train collides with a train operating a snowplow near Lachute, Quebec. Three crew members on the snowplow train were killed.
- April 9 – Spain – On the line from Barcelona to Tarrasa, two trains collide on a sharp curve near a tunnel at Las Planas crushing several cars against the wall which killed 25 and seriously injured 46.
- May 1 – Poland – A German express train from Königsberg (now Kaliningrad, Russia) to Berlin crossing the Polish Corridor derails on a sharp curve between Swarożyn (Swaroschin) and Starogard Gdański (Preußisch Stargard), sending the locomotive and six cars 25 feet (8 m) down an embankment; 26 people are killed and 12 seriously injured, mostly in first class, and because the train doors were locked while in Poland, passengers remain locked into the undamaged cars for another two hours. Germany accused Poland of poor maintenance while Poland blamed Germany of sabotaging their own train to discredit Poland.
- June 9 – Australia – near Traveston, South East Queensland. The Rockhampton Mail train derails on a high timber trestle bridge, killing ten people and injured 48 when a passenger car and the luggage van plunged off the bridge, and another passenger car was pulled on its side. It resulted in baggage cars being specially built for passenger trains and ended, for a time, the use of goods vehicles on passenger trains.
- June 16 – United States – Rockport train wreck: A special seven-car Delaware, Lackawanna and Western Railroad passenger train from Chicago to Hoboken, New Jersey encounters road debris that had been washed onto a grade crossing by a torrential rainstorm. The train derails, and two cars land adjacent to the locomotive, with escaping steam scalding numerous passengers; 51 were killed. The passengers were German-Americans traveling to Bremen, Germany, via the SS Republic.
- June 18 – United Kingdom – A Metropolitan Railway electric locomotive collides with carriages at Baker Street, London injuring six people.
- August 20 – United States – Two passenger trains collide head-on on the Denver & Rio Grande Western Railroad near Granite, Colorado killing two and injuring 117. The cause was determined to be human error and a blistering report followed: "It would be difficult to imagine a more inherently dangerous system, or lack of system, for the operation of trains...".
- August 22 – Isle of Man – A train hauled by No.3 Pender runs into Douglas station with insufficient braking power as the brakeman was left behind at Union Mills killing the driver. Vacuum brakes were introduced on the Isle of Man Railway as a result of the accident.
- October 2 – United States – The Chesapeake and Ohio Railway's 4,000-foot (1,200 m) long Church Hill Tunnel in Richmond, Virginia, collapses on a work train, killing four and trapping steam locomotive 231 and 10 flat cars. Rescue efforts resulted in further collapse and the tunnel was sealed with the train and unrecovered victims entombed within.
- October 26 – United States – On the St. Louis–San Francisco Railway, the Sunnyland passenger train from St. Louis to Kansas City derails due to a broken rail at 50–60 mph (80–100 km/h) and tumbles down an embankment as it approaches Victoria, Mississippi killing 21.

== 1926 ==
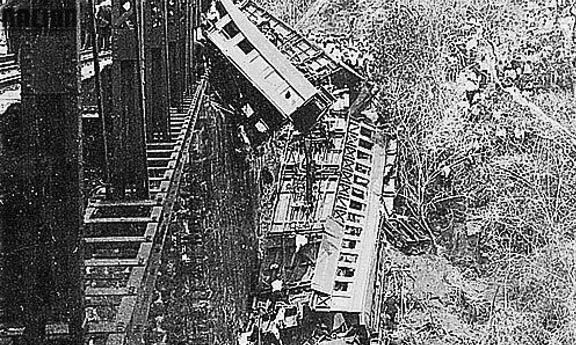
- El Virilla train accident
  March 14 – Costa Rica – El Virilla train accident: A train fell off a bridge over the Río Virilla between Heredia and Tibás, resulting in 248 deaths and 93 wounded.
- May 24 – Germany – A train crashes into the rear of an excursion train standing at the platform at Munich East station killing 33 people and injuring about 100. The driver of the second train was convicted and sentenced to five months in prison.
- May 26 – United Kingdom – During the General Strike of 1926, a London and North Eastern Railway passenger train is deliberately derailed by miners south of Cramlington, Northumberland.
- May 26 – Australia – Caulfield, Victoria: Caulfield railway accident, a night-time collision of a six-car electric multiple unit with another six-car electric multiple unit at Caulfield Railway Station resulted in three deaths and numerous injuries.
- June 7 – Spain – Barcelona: The famous architect Antoni Gaudí was run over by a tram and died a few days later.
- June 9 – South Africa – At Salt River, near Cape Town, a train derails due to a coupling lodged in the track. The rear cars broke away and two of them hit an overbridge killing 17 people and injuring about 40 or 50.
- July 3 – France – At Achères-la-Forêt on the Chemins de fer de l'Est, a train from Le Havre to Paris takes a turnout due to urgent repairs to the main line. The driver misses the 30 km/h (19 mph) speed restriction and derails killing 20, including the himself, and injuring 98.
- August 7 – United Kingdom – On an LNER 6-car electric multiple unit train completing a loop service from Newcastle via Monkseaton, after leaving Heaton station the driver ties down the control and dead man's handle with two handkerchiefs, leaves his driving position, leans out of the cab window to look backwards, strikes a bridge support, and is dragged out of the train and killed. Realizing the train was overshooting Manors station, the guard applies brakes, but too late to prevent a 35 mph (56 km/h) collision with a freight train. The front cars were lightly loaded, but 16 passengers were injured, including a young "courting couple" in the frontmost compartment—whom the driver was presumably trying to watch, but the official report declined to speculate.
- August 13 – United States – Calverton, New York – Long Island Rail Road's Shelter Island Express train jumps the tracks and crashes into the Golden's Pickle Works factory, resulting in six deaths.
- August 19 – Germany – A Berlin-to-Cologne express derails on an embankment due to sabotage of the track. The locomotive and seven cars fall down the embankment and two cars are telescoped; 21 people died. Two men were convicted and sentenced to death.
- August 30 – United Kingdom – A passenger train collides with a charabanc on a level crossing at Naworth, Cumberland due to errors by the crossing keeper and a lack of interlocking between signals and the gates, killing nine.
- September 1 – Spain – The Barcelona-to-Valencia mail train runs into a landslide and derails between L'Ametlla de Mar and L'Ampolla killing 25 and injuring 50.
- September 5 – United States – Granite, Colorado – Denver & Rio Grande Western Railroad's Scenic Limited running southeast, exceeds the rated speed for the track and crashes into the Arkansas River, resulting in 30 deaths and 54 injuries. The locomotive, tender, and six cars plunged into the river. Crash reports indicate the engineer was attempting to make up time since the train was running 25 minutes late.
- September 8 – United Kingdom – The driver of a passenger train loses control on greasy rails and the train overruns buffers at Leeds.
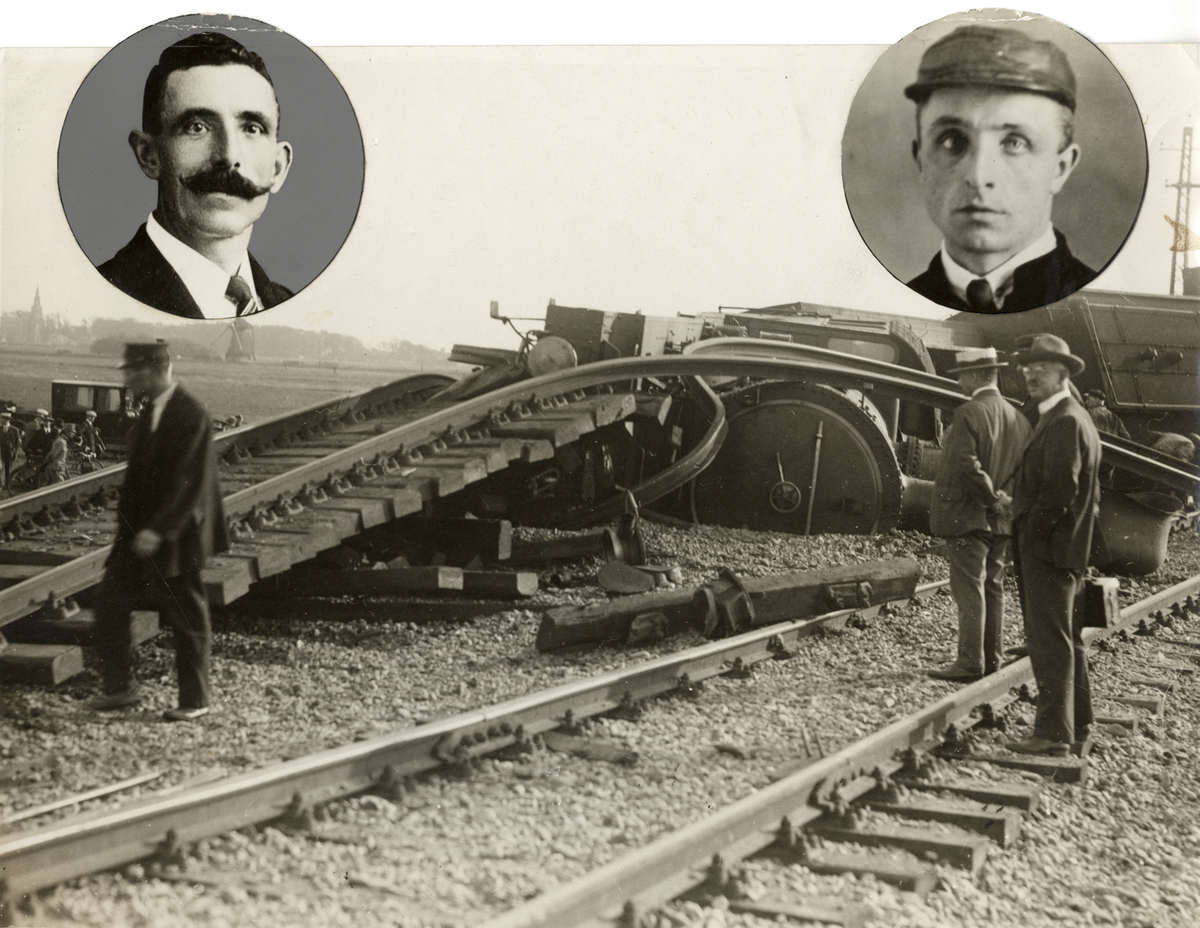
- Voorschoten
  September 9 - Netherlands - 1926 Voorschoten train crash: A passenger train derails near Voorschoten, South Holland. Two crew and two passengers are killed.
- September 13 – Australia – Murulla railway accident: Goods wagons on a siding uncouple, roll down a slope and crash into an oncoming mail train, resulting in 27 deaths and 37 injuries. It would remain the worst train crash in New South Wales history for just under 51 years until the Granville rail disaster of 1977 which left 84 people dead in Australia's worst rail disaster.
- September 23 – Japan – A Tokyo-Shimonoseki limited express derails at Hataga river bridge in eastern Hiroshima, in an incident caused by heavy rain and flooding, killing 34 and injuring 39.
- October 4 – Switzerland – Ricken Tunnel railway accident: A freight train gets stuck on an incline on the Ricken Tunnel between Kaltbrunn and Wattwil. Due to poor tunnel ventilation, the locomotive's exhaust gases kill 9.
- November 5 – United Kingdom – A milk train divides near Bramshot Halt, Hampshire. Because the guard fails to protect the train, a passenger train runs into it. One person was killed.
- November 19 – United Kingdom – A defective private-owner coal wagon derails at Parkgate and Rawmarsh, Yorkshire. Further wagons derail and partially collapse a signal post. A passing express passenger train collides with the signal post, ripping out the side of the carriages. Eleven people were killed.
- November 24 – United Kingdom – A London, Midland and Scottish Railway passenger train overruns signals at Upney, Essex and rear-ends another passenger train injuring 604 people.
- December 8 – China – A passenger and freight train collide at Machungho on the South Manchuria Railway, killing 25 and seriously injuring 54.
- December 11 – China – A passenger and freight train collide on the South Manchuria Railway, killing 25 and seriously injuring 54, this time at Tieling.
- December 23 – United States – Rockmart, Georgia. The Northbound Ponce de Leon crashes head-on into the Southbound Royal Palm, resulting in 19 deaths and 115 injuries. It was remembered later on as the world-famous folk song, "Wreck of the Royal Palm" by Vernon Dalhart.

== 1927 ==
- January 9 – United States – Savannah, New York – The eighth section of the eastbound Twentieth Century Limited rear-ended the seventh section of the Century in heavy fog, killing one and injuring fifty-four.
- February 13 – United Kingdom – Hull Paragon rail accident: One signalman operated his lever too early, defeating the interlocking mechanism, just as another signalman operated the wrong lever. The resulting head-on collision killed twelve.
- February 27 – United Kingdom – An express passenger train collides with a light engine near Penistone, Derbyshire due to an error by the driver of the light engine.
- May 15 – Canada – Three trainmen were killed and many passengers injured when the Canadian Pacific Railway eastbound express train runs into a rockslide and derails near Nipigon, Ontario.
- July 6 – Argentina – Tragedy of Alpatacal: A trainload of Chilean army cadets were traveling from their school in Santiago, Chile to attend the dedication of a monument in Buenos Aires. At Alpatacal in Mendoza Province, the special was signaled with detonators to stop and wait for the Internacional coming from Buenos Aires. The train fails to stop and hits the other train, killing thirty and injuring hundreds.
- July 27 – South Africa – Heidelberg: On a single-track line, the driver of a southbound goods train from Roodekop (near Johannesburg) apparently forgets that the staff he is carrying only allows him to proceed as far as a newly added side track, where he is to wait for a northbound train from Durban. Altogether 29 people were killed, some of them by exposure to the winter weather while waiting for rescue, and 54 injured.
- August 20 – United Kingdom – A passenger train derails due to poor track at Bearstead, Kent. The locomotive is repaired and returned to service on 23 August, but is involved in another accident the next day.
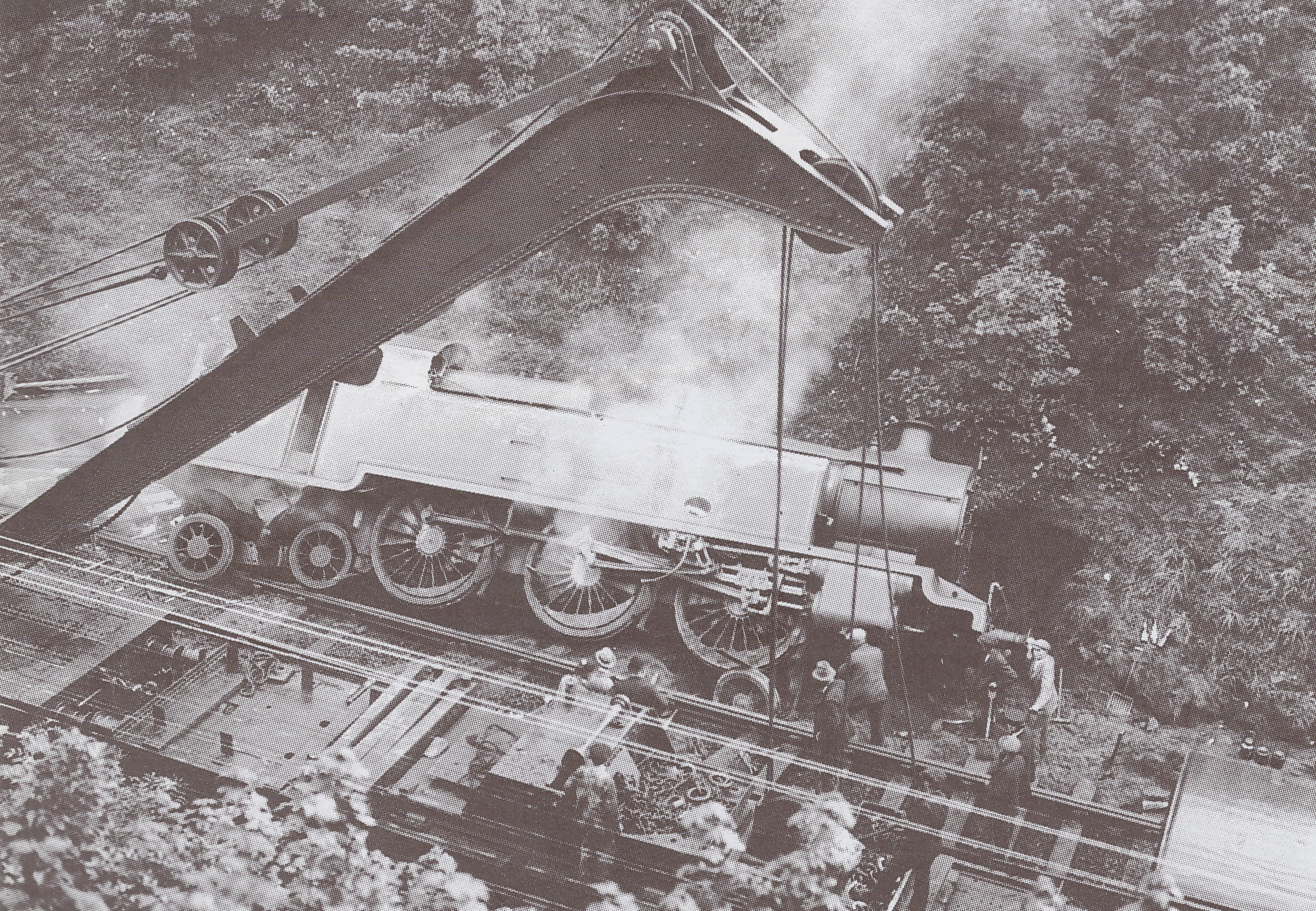
- Sevenoaks railway accident
  August 24 – United Kingdom – Sevenoaks railway accident: Water in the tanks of a locomotive on the Southern Railway sloshes violently and derails the train, killing 13.
- August 25 – France – On the Chemin de fer du Montenvers, the rack railway from Chamonix-Mont-Blanc to the Hotel de Montenvers by the Mer de Glace glacier, a train runs away downhill due to operating errors by the crew. The first car derails, breaks away, and falls 45 feet (14 m) into a ravine, killing 16 to 20 people.
- October 2 - United States - Nine are injured when three coaches of the Peoria Limited of the Illinois Traction System derail on a curve at Edwardsville, Illinois, and crash into the porch of the Vanze Hotel. Two passengers are taken to St. Elizabeth’s Hospital at Venice, Illinois, while others are given treatment at the hotel. Motorman W. M. Nave, who was bruised, stated that the brakes failed to function as the trainset approached the curve near the hotel.
- October 26 - Yugoslavia - A freight train derailed while crossing a bridge between the Bradina and Brđani stations (near Konjic in what is now Bosnia and Herzegovina). Eight cars fell into the river. Two train operators were killed and two more injured. The Vienna correspondent of the Exchange Telegraph stated “that 260 persons are reported to have been killed when a passenger train plunged over a precipice between Sarajevo and Mostar.”
- December 3 – Canada – An eastbound Canadian Pacific Railway passenger train collides with the derailed cars of a westbound Canadian National Railways freight train on the CNR's double-track line near Port Credit (now part of Mississauga, Ontario).

== 1928 ==
- January 22 – British India – Between Hayaghat (now in Darbhanga District, Bihar) and Kishanpur (now in Samastipur District, Bihar), a locomotive breaks away from the train behind it, which then crashes hard into it; two cars derail and fall down an embankment. At least thirty people died.
- January 28 – British India – A mail train from Mandalay to Rangoon (now Yangon), both now in Myanmar, is derailed by sabotage to the track at a bridge between Yindsikkon (now Yin Taik Kone) and Kyauktaga. The locomotive and four cars fall into the river 50 feet (15 m) below, killing 54 people and injuring at least 30. Dacoits were suspected of the crime and an Indian man was sentenced to death, but his conviction was quashed.
- March 12 – British Ceylon (now Sri Lanka) – Kalutara: An express from Galle to Colombo crashes head-on at speed into an ordinary passenger train, killing 25 or 28 people and injuring 41. Several railwaymen are found responsible.
- June 4 – China – Feng-tien, Mukden – Huanggutun incident: The personal train of Generalissimo Zhang Zuolin is heavily damaged by an assassin's bomb placed on a bridge over the railway. Several officials on board were killed immediately; Zhang succumbed to his mortal wounds within hours.
- June 10 – Germany – The locomotive and four cars of the Munich to Frankfurt fall down an embankment after derailing at Veitsbronn killing 22.
- June 27 – United Kingdom – Darlington rail crash, head-on collision kills 25.
- July 2 – United Kingdom – A London, Midland and Scottish Railway freight train derail at Pinwherry, Wigtownshire killing the crew of both locomotives.
- July 9 – United Kingdom – B2X class locomotive No. B210 sideswipes an electric multiple unit at London Bridge when the driver misreads signals. Two people are killed and nine injured, six seriously.
- August 6 - United States - Two passenger trains derail in Mounds, Illinois. The derailment is caused by a large pipe lying on the tracks. Reports indicate 8-9 people dead and around 200 are injured.
- August 17 – United Kingdom – A London and North Eastern Railway express passenger train hits a lorry on a level crossing near Shepreth, Cambridgeshire and derails.
- August 24 – United States – 1928 Times Square derailment: The last two cars of a downtown express train on the IRT Broadway–Seventh Avenue Line of the New York City subway derail at a switch, killing 18 people and injuring about 100.
- August 27 – United Kingdom – A London, Midland and Scottish Railway passenger train overruns the buffers at Euston, London, injuring 30 people.
- September 10 – Czechoslovakia – Between Zaječí and Břeclav, both now in Czechia, an express passenger train from Paris to Bucharest collided with a freight train, killing 21 people and injuring at least 29.
- October 13 – United Kingdom – Charfield railway disaster: A Leeds-to-Bristol night mail train failed to stop at signals and collided with a freight train being moved into a siding. The mail train derailed and then collided with another freight train on the main line. Gas lighting on the passenger coaches of the mail train caused an intense fire, destroying four coaches. An estimated 16 died, and 41 were injured according to official report.
- October 25 United Kingdom – A London, Midland and Scottish Railway express passenger train rear-ends a freight train near Dinwoodie, Dumfriesshire due to a signalman's error. Four people are killed and five injured.
- October 26 – Romania – At Reșca, a fast train to Bucharest is incorrectly diverted onto a track occupied by the Simplon Orient Express. Two cars of the diverted train telescope and almost everyone in them is killed; 34 were killed altogether. In the aftermath there were complaints that the station staff were so unhelpful that the passengers had to telegraph for rescue. Several railwaymen are punished by firing or suspension.

== 1929 ==
- January 17 – United States – near Aberdeen, Maryland: A Pennsylvania Railroad train bound for Baltimore rear-ends a freight, then a third train hits the derailed freight killing five and injuring 38. An unlit semaphore stop signal was invisible in heavy fog. Bandleader Fletcher Henderson, traveling with several of his musicians, was among the injured but still conducted an engagement in Baltimore that night.
- January – United Kingdom – An express passenger train overruns signals at Ashchurch, Gloucestershire and collides with a freight train killing three.
- February 2 – United Kingdom – A signalman's error at Bridgeton Cross, Renfrewshire, diverts a passenger train into the bay platform, where it crashes into a horsebox. Many people are injured.
- February 12 – United Kingdom – A signalman's error causes a London Midland and Scottish Railway express passenger train to collide at Doe Hill, Derbyshire, killing two.
- June 9 – United Kingdom – A London and North Eastern Railway steam railcar 220 Waterwitch overruns signals at Marshgate Junction, Yorkshire and stops on the main line where it is struck by an express passenger train.
- August 7 - Canada - An automobile driver caused the derailment of a Canadian Pacific Railway train near Tweed, Ontario which killed one of the crew.
- August 25 – Germany – Buir: The D29, running from Paris to Warsaw, derails some 300 metres (980 ft) west of Buir station, near the town of Düren. Due to construction work, the train was supposed to be diverted to a siding, but the train driver received wrong instructions in Düren and noticed the signal too late, entering the siding at 100 kilometres per hour (62 mph) instead of 50 kilometres per hour (31 mph). 13 passengers ware killed and 40 injured. This led to the introduction of the La, the German railways' book of temporary speed restrictions on the network and the distant signals indicating to expect the home signal showing to slow down if necessary.
- September 23 – USSR – A train from Moscow (now in Russia) to Siberia derails at Zuevka, between Kursk (now in Russia) and Kharkiv (now in Ukraine); at least 30 were killed.
- October 4 – United Kingdom – The driver of a freight train passed a danger signal at Tottenham Hale, London. An express passenger train ran into it.
- November 20 – United Kingdom – Bath Green Park runaway: A freight train runs away and crashed in Bath Green Park goods yard, killing the driver and two railway employees in the yard, and severely injuring the fireman. The runaway was caused by the crew being overcome by fumes while travelling through Combe Down Tunnel.

== See also ==
- List of London Underground accidents

== Sources ==
- "Europe's history of rail disasters". BBC. October 11, 2006.
- "World's worst rail disasters". BBC. December 19, 2007.
- "GenDisasters Train Wrecks 1869–1943". Archived from the original on 2015-04-16.
- "Interstate Commerce Commission Investigations of Railroad Accidents 1911–1993". U.S. Department of Transportation. Archived from the original on 2004-10-12.
- Beebe, Lucius & Clegg, Charles (1952). Hear the train blow; a pictorial epic of America in the railroad age. New York: Grosset & Dunlap. ASIN B000I83FTC.
- Gerard, Malcolm; Hamilton, J. A. B. (1981) [1967]. Trains to Nowhere. London: George Allen & Unwin. ISBN 0-04-385084-7.
- Earnshaw, Alan (1989). Trains in Trouble: Vol. 5. Penryn: Atlantic Books. ISBN 0-906899-35-4.
- Earnshaw, Alan (1990). Trains in Trouble: Vol. 6. Penryn: Atlantic Books. ISBN 0-906899-37-0.
- Earnshaw, Alan (1991). Trains in Trouble: Vol. 7. Penryn: Atlantic Books. ISBN 0-906899-50-8.
- Earnshaw, Alan (1993). Trains in Trouble: Vol. 8. Penryn: Atlantic Books. ISBN 0-906899-52-4.
- Gould, David (2000). Maunsell's SR Steam Carriage Stock. Headington, Oxford: The Oakwood Press. ISBN 9780853615552.
- Haine, Edgar A. (1993). Railroad Wrecks. New York: Cornwall Books. ISBN 978-0-8453-4844-4.
- Hall, Stanley (1990). The Railway Detectives. London: Ian Allan. ISBN 0-7110-1929-0.
- Hoole, Ken (1982). Trains in Trouble: Vol. 3. Redruth: Atlantic Books. ISBN 0-906899-05-2.
- Hoole, Ken (1983). Trains in Trouble: Vol. 4. Truro: Atlantic Books. ISBN 0-906899-07-9.
- Karr, Ronald D. (1995). The Rail Lines of Southern New England – A Handbook of Railroad History. Branch Line Press. ISBN 978-0-942147-02-5.
- Kidner, R. W. (1977) [1963]. The South Eastern and Chatham Railway. Tarrant Hinton: The Oakwood Press.
- Kichenside, Geoffrey (1997). Great Train Disasters. Bristol: Siena Books. ISBN 0-75252-630-8.
- Leslie, Frank (1882-01-21). Illustrated Newspaper. Vol. LIII, no. 1,374. New York. p. 1.
- Moody, G. T. (1979) [1957]. Southern Electric 1909–1979 (Fifth ed.). Shepperton: Ian Allan Ltd. ISBN 0-7110-0924-4.
- Reed, Robert C. (1968). Train Wrecks – A Pictorial History of Accidents on the Main Line. New York: Bonanza Books. ISBN 978-0-517-32897-2.
- Rolt, L. T. C.; Kichenside, G. M. (1982). Red for Danger: A history of railway accidents and railway safety (4th ed.). Newton Abbot, Devon: David & Charles. ISBN 0-7153-8362-0. OCLC 9526651.
- Semmens, Peter (1994). Railway Disasters of the World: Principal Passenger Train Accidents of the 20th Century. Patrick Stephens Ltd. ISBN 1-85260-323-2.
- Shaw, Robert B. (1978). A History of Railroad Accidents, Safety Precautions and Operating Practices. LCCN 78104064.
- Smith, Peter (1978). Footplate over the Mendips. Oxford: Oxford Publishing Company. ISBN 0-86093-022-X.
- Spence, Jeoffry (1975). Victorian & Edwardian Railways from old photographs. London: Batsford. ISBN 0-7134-3044-3.
- Trevena, Arthur (1980). Trains in Trouble: Vol. 1. Redruth: Atlantic Books. ISBN 0-906899-01-X.
- Trevena, Arthur (1981). Trains in Trouble: Vol. 2. Redruth: Atlantic Books. ISBN 0-906899-03-6.
- Vaughan, Adrian (1989). Obstruction Danger. Wellingborough: Patrick Stephens Limited. ISBN 1-85260-055-1.
