= Huntingdon Valley station =

Railway station in Pennsylvania, United States

Huntingdon Valley
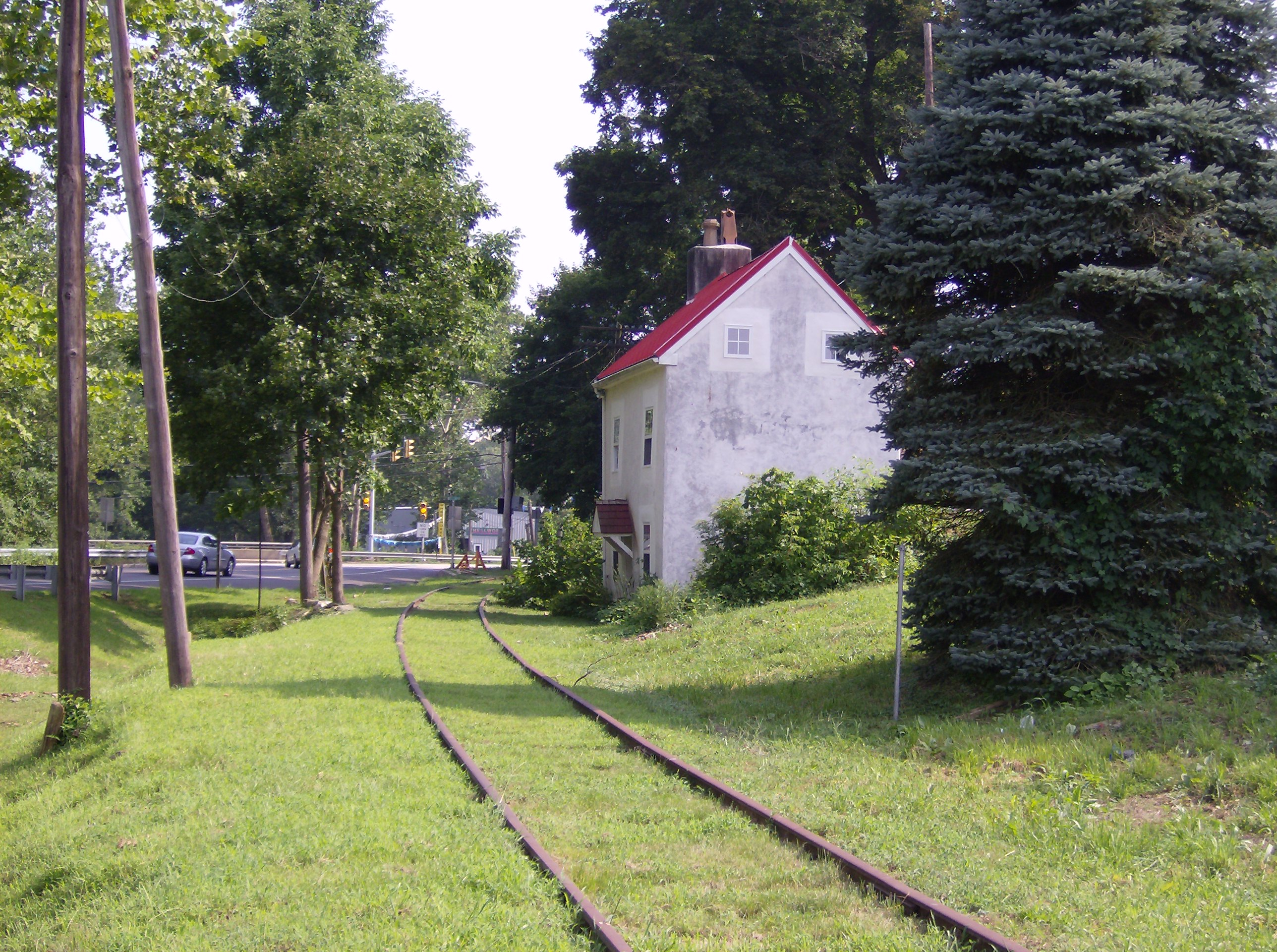
- Dormant tracks and a private residence near the former site of Huntingdon Valley station.

General information
- Location: 796 Welsh Road; Lower Moreland Township, Pennsylvania
- Coordinates: 40.1210°N 75.0729°W
- Owner: SEPTA
- Platforms: 1 side platform
- Tracks: 1

Construction
- Structure type: Station shed
- Accessible: No

History
- Closed: January 18, 1983

Former services
Preceding station	SEPTA	Following station
Walnut Hill toward Reading Terminal	Newtown Line	Bryn Athyn toward Newtown
Preceding station	Reading Railroad	Following station
Fox Chase toward Philadelphia	Newtown Branch	Bryn Athyn toward Newtown
Location

Huntingdon Valley station is a former SEPTA Regional Rail station in Lower Moreland Township, Pennsylvania. It was located on Terwood Road near Old Welsh Road (PA 63) and served the Fox Chase/Newtown Line. SEPTA closed the station in 1983, and the shelter was subsequently demolished.

== History ==
Huntingdon Valley station, and all of those north of Fox Chase station, was closed on January 18, 1983, due to failing diesel train equipment SEPTA had no desire to repair.

In addition, a labor dispute began within the SEPTA organization when the transit operator inherited 1,700 displaced employees from Conrail. SEPTA insisted on utilizing transit operators from the Broad Street Subway to operate Fox Chase–Newtown diesel trains, while Conrail requested that railroad motormen run the service. When a federal court ruled that SEPTA had to use Conrail employees in order to offer job assurance, SEPTA cancelled Fox Chase–Newtown trains. Service in the diesel-only territory north of Fox Chase was cancelled at that time, and Huntingdon Valley station still appears in publicly posted tariffs.

Although rail service was initially replaced with a Fox Chase–Newtown shuttle bus, patronage remained light, and the Fox Chase–Newtown shuttle bus service ended on November 30, 1998.

Surviving tracks were removed by Montgomery County in summer 2014 for construction of the $2 million Pennypack Trail extension.
