= County Line station (SEPTA Regional Rail) =

Railway station in Pennsylvania, United States

County Line
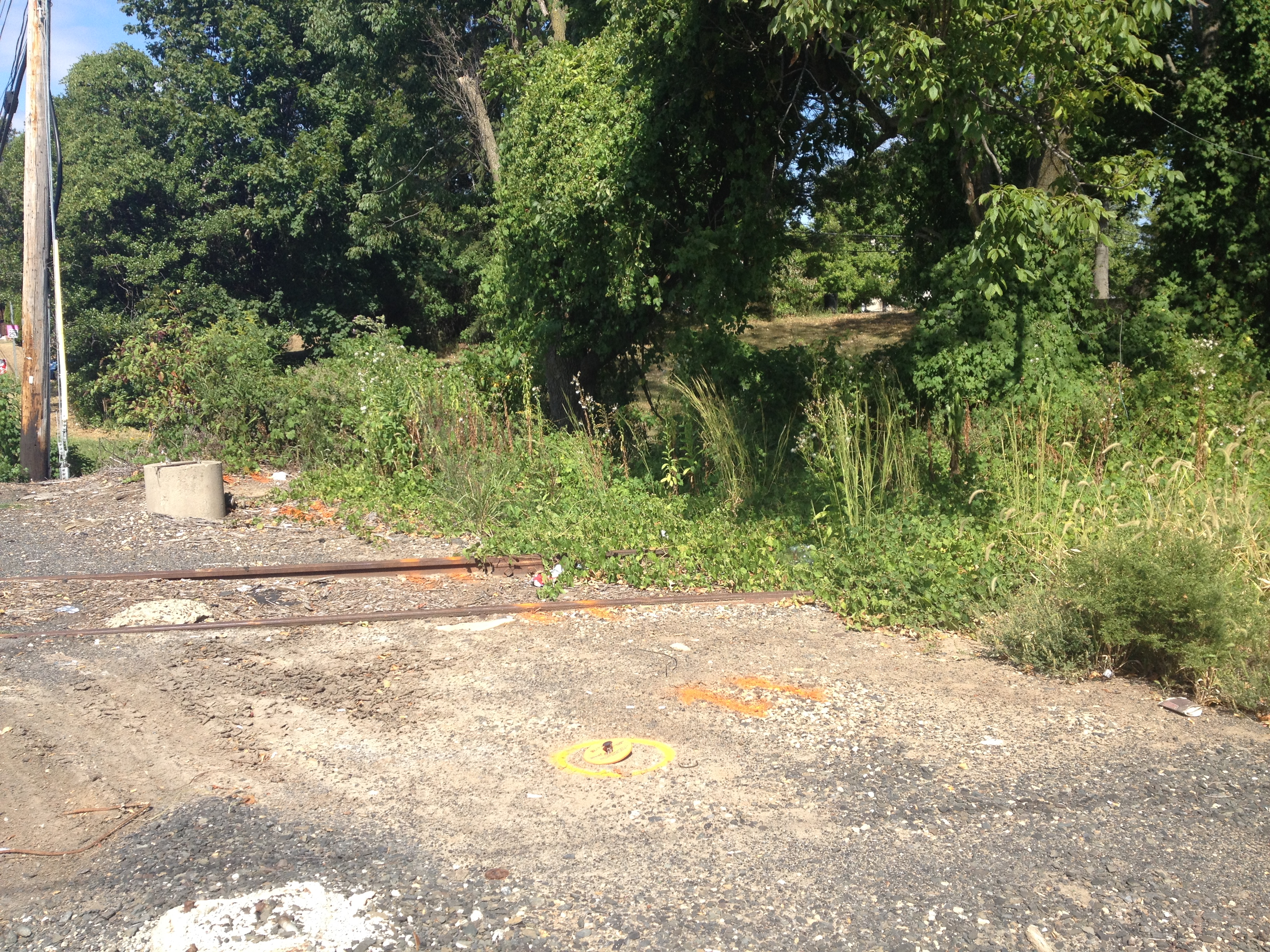
- County Line station site in September 2016

General information
- Location: 511 County Line Road; Upper Southampton, Pennsylvania
- Coordinates: 40.1648°N 75.0600°W
- Owner: SEPTA
- Platforms: 1 side platform
- Tracks: 1

Construction
- Structure type: station shed (demolished)

History
- Closed: January 18, 1983

Former services
Preceding station	SEPTA	Following station
Bryn Athyn toward Reading Terminal	Newtown Line	Southampton toward Newtown
Location

County Line station is a derelict SEPTA Regional Rail station in Upper Southampton Township, Pennsylvania. It served a now-abandoned segment of SEPTA Newtown Line, and was located on County Line Road near the County Line Industrial Park.

== History ==
County Line station, and all of those north of Fox Chase, was closed on January 18, 1983 due to failing diesel train equipment.

In addition, a labor dispute began within the SEPTA organization when the transit operator inherited 1,700 displaced employees from Conrail. SEPTA insisted on using transit operators from the Broad Street Subway to operate Fox Chase–Newtown diesel trains, while Conrail requested that railroad motormen run the service. When a federal court ruled that SEPTA had to use Conrail employees in order to offer job assurance, SEPTA cancelled Fox Chase–Newtown trains. Service in the diesel-only territory north of Fox Chase was cancelled at that time, and County Line station still appears in publicly posted tariffs.

Although rail service was initially replaced with a Fox Chase–Newtown shuttle bus, patronage remained light, and the Fox Chase–Newtown shuttle bus service ended on November 30, 1998.

The station shed was demolished in the 1990s.
