= Walnut Hill station (SEPTA) =

Railway station in Pennsylvania, United States

Walnut Hill
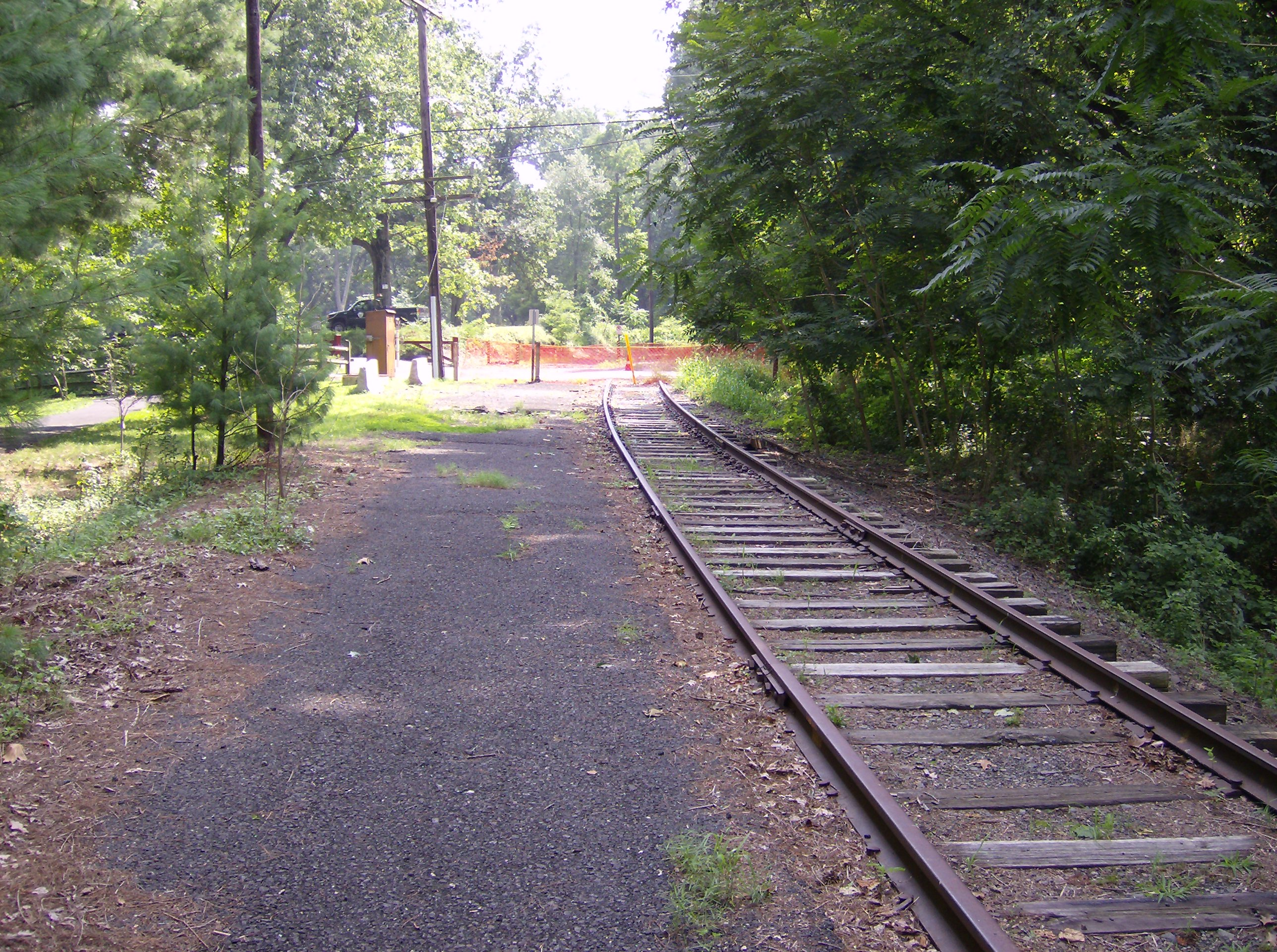
- The Walnut Hill station site, now the entrance to the Pennypack Trail Extension.

General information
- Location: 200 Moredon Road; Abington Township, Pennsylvania
- Coordinates: 40.0970°N 75.0744°W
- System: Former railroad station
- Owner: SEPTA
- Platforms: 1 side platform
- Tracks: 1

Construction
- Accessible: No

History
- Closed: January 18, 1983

Former services
Preceding station	SEPTA	Following station
Fox Chase toward Reading Terminal	Newtown Line	Huntingdon Valley toward Newtown
Location

Walnut Hill station was a SEPTA Regional Rail station in Abington Township, Montgomery County, Pennsylvania. Located on Moredon Road, it served the Fox Chase/Newtown Line. SEPTA closed the station in 1983.

== History ==
Walnut Hill, and all stations north of Fox Chase, was closed on January 18, 1983, due to failing diesel train equipment that SEPTA had no desire to repair.

In addition, a labor dispute began within the SEPTA organization when the transit operator inherited 1,700 displaced employees from Conrail. SEPTA insisted on utilizing transit operators from the Broad Street Subway to operate Fox Chase/Newtown diesel trains, while Conrail requested that railroad engineers run the service. When a federal court ruled that SEPTA had to use Conrail employees in order to offer job assurance, SEPTA canceled Fox Chase–Newtown trains. Service in the diesel-only territory north of Fox Chase was cancelled at that time, and Walnut Hill station still appears in publicly posted tariffs.

Although rail service was initially replaced with a Fox Chase–Newtown shuttle bus, patronage remained light, and the Fox Chase–Newtown shuttle bus service ended on November 30, 1998.
