= Southampton station (Pennsylvania) =

Railway station in Pennsylvania, United States

Southampton
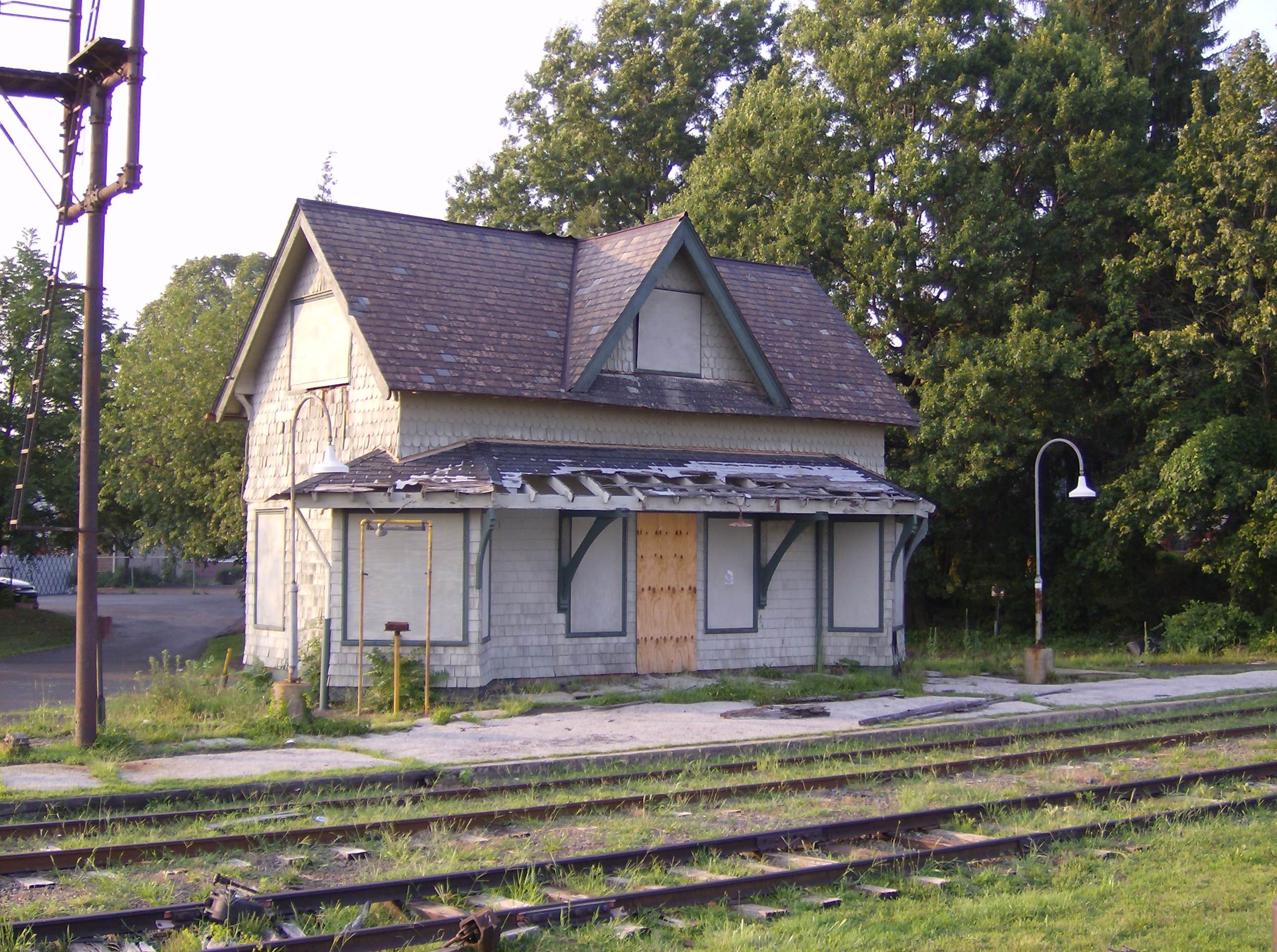
- Southampton station in 2006

General information
- Location: Second Street Pike (PA 232) and Knowles Avenue; Southampton, Pennsylvania
- Coordinates: 40.1720°N 75.0438°W
- Owner: SEPTA
- Platforms: 1 side platform
- Tracks: 2

Construction
- Platform levels: 1
- Parking: 15 spaces
- Accessible: No

History
- Opened: February 4, 1878
- Closed: January 18, 1983
- Rebuilt: 1892 (Reading Railroad)

Former services
Preceding station	SEPTA	Following station
County Line toward Reading Terminal	Newtown Line	Churchville toward Newtown
Preceding station	Reading Railroad	Following station
Woodmont toward Philadelphia	Newtown Branch	Churchville toward Newtown
Location

Southampton station is a former railroad station in Southampton, Pennsylvania. Built by the Reading Railroad in 1892, it later served SEPTA Regional Rail's Fox Chase/Newtown Line. SEPTA closed the station along with several others in 1983. It is located on Second Street Pike (PA 232) near Knowles Avenue.

== History ==
Built in 1892, Southampton station was a stop on the Reading Railroad's Newtown Line. It later became a part of SEPTA's Fox Chase Rapid Transit Line. The station and all of those north of Fox Chase station were closed on January 18, 1983, due to failing diesel train equipment).

In addition, a labor dispute began within the SEPTA organization when the transit operator inherited 1,700 displaced employees from Conrail. SEPTA insisted on uing transit operators from the Broad Street Subway to operate Fox Chase–Newtown diesel trains, while Conrail requested that railroad engineers run the service. When a federal court ruled that SEPTA had to use Conrail employees to offer job assurance, SEPTA cancelled Fox Chase–Newtown trains. Service in the diesel-only territory north of Fox Chase was cancelled at that time, and Southampton station still appears in publicly posted tariffs.

Although rail service was initially replaced with a Fox Chase–Newtown shuttle bus, patronage remained light, and the Fox Chase–Newtown shuttle bus service ended on November 30, 1998.

As of 2023, surviving tracks have been removed and replaced with a rail-trail.

== Fire ==
Three months after SEPTA assumed operations, on January 2, 1982, the crossing at Second Street Pike south of Southampton station was the site of a fiery crash between a train (Rail Diesel Car #9164, a self-propelled passenger car), an ARCO gasoline truck, and a car. Engineer Donald Williams died from multiple burns. Five people were also injured; the accident caused flames to rise 50 feet in the air and created a plume of black smoke visible for miles. Photographs appear to indicate the crossing signal equipment was working properly, with warning lights continuing to warn motorists after the collision occurred, but a report by the National Transportation Safety Board suggested the lights were intermittently working as the tank truck approached the crossing, as mentioned by eyewitnesses. SEPTA was using a single rail diesel car (RDC #9164), which was not equipped with signal excitation equipment required for single-car operation. The Reading Railroad had two RDCs equipped for single-car operation (nos. 9151 and 9152), which were transferred to SEPTA, neither of which was in use on this holiday weekend when rail traffic was especially light. Also, due to the acute angle of the railroad crossing and the buildings nearby, the truck driver could not see the RDC approaching from his right until stopping short of a collision was no longer possible. SEPTA general manager David L. Gunn ordered additional safety precautions, but service ceased just over a year after the accident.
