= Fox Chase Line =

SEPTA Regional Rail service

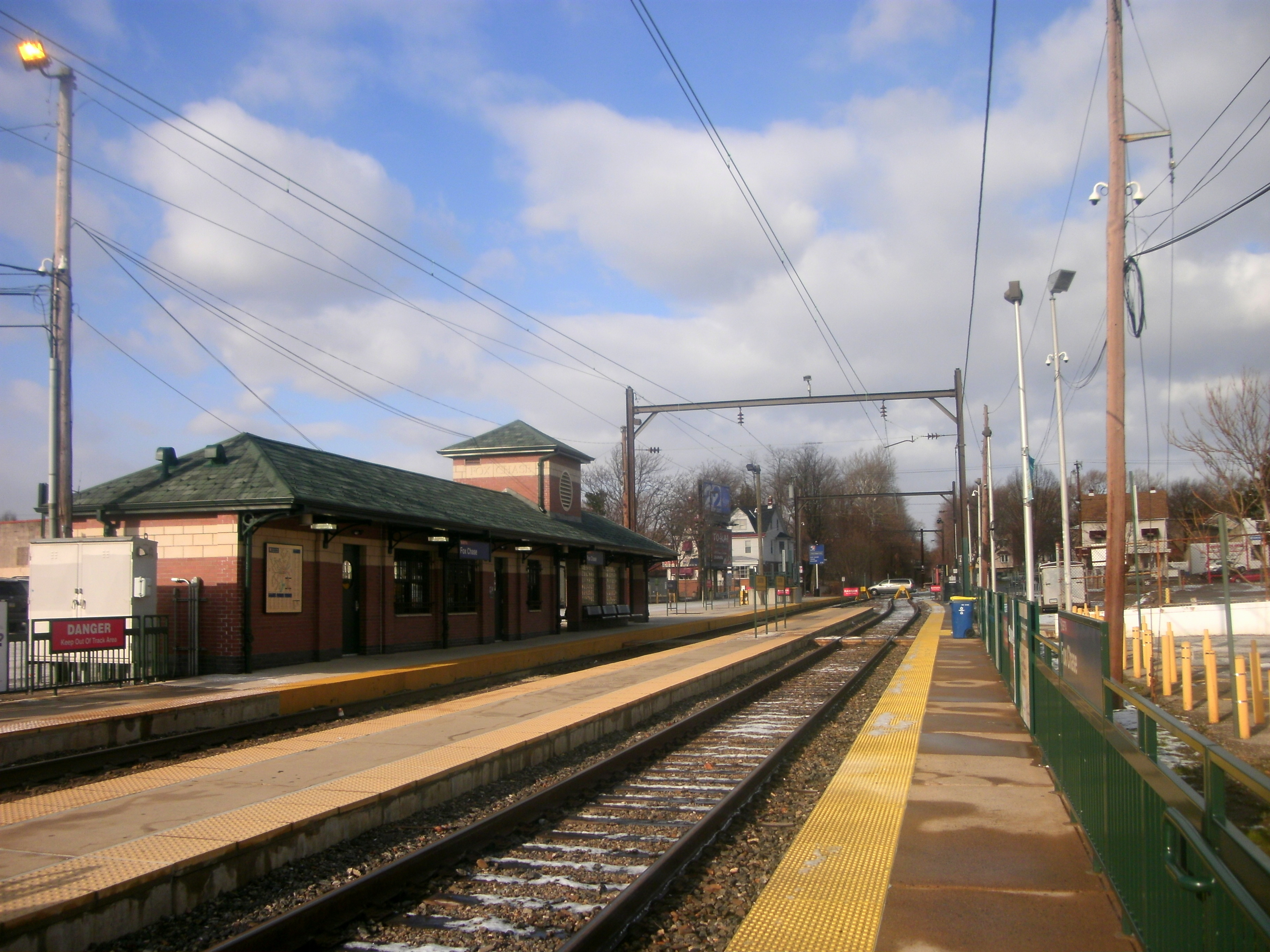
- Fox Chase station in December 2012

Overview
- Service type: SEPTA Regional Rail commuter service
- Current operator: SEPTA
- Former operator: Reading Company
- Ridership: 3,495 (FY 2025)

Route
- Termini: Fox Chase; Penn Medicine Station; 30th Street Station (weekends and major holidays)
- Stops: 11
- Lines used: Fox Chase Branch; SEPTA Main Line

Technical
- Rolling stock: Electric multiple units
- Electrification: Overhead line, 12 kV 25 Hz AC

The Fox Chase Line is a SEPTA Regional Rail service connecting Center City Philadelphia with Fox Chase. It uses the Fox Chase Branch, which branches off from the SEPTA Main Line at Newtown Junction north of the Wayne Junction station. It runs entirely within the city of Philadelphia. The line is fully grade-separated, except for one grade crossing on Oxford Avenue.

Originally known as the Fox Chase/Newtown Branch, service was truncated in January 1983 from Newtown to its current terminus in Philadelphia at Fox Chase. Plans to restore service beyond Fox Chase remained on SEPTA's Capital Program until 2009. The rail bed between Fox Chase and Southampton has been converted to rail trail usage.

== History ==
Most of what is now the Fox Chase Branch was opened by the Philadelphia, Newtown and New York Railroad, reaching Fox Chase in 1876 and Newtown in 1878. Initially, it was part of the Pennsylvania Railroad system, but the Philadelphia and Reading Railroad leased it in 1879. On May 27, 1906, the cutoff between Cheltenham and Neshaminy Falls opened. The Newtown Branch was the last steam-hauled suburban service on the Reading, lasting until May 6, 1952.

=== Accidents ===
On December 5, 1921, an accident on the line in Bryn Athyn occurred where two steam trains collided head on with each other. On January 2, 1982, a train collided with a tanker truck at Southampton station.

=== Conrail/SEPTA Era ===

Following the Reading's final bankruptcy in 1976 the branch was conveyed to SEPTA; Conrail operated services under contract until 1983 when SEPTA took full control. Between 1984 and 2010 the route was designated R8 Fox Chase as part of SEPTA's diametrical reorganization of its lines. Fox Chase trains operated through Center City to the Chestnut Hill West Line. Plans had called for the Fox Chase Line to be paired with a Bryn Mawr local and designated R4, but this depended on a never-built connection from the Chestnut Hill West Line to the ex-Reading near Wayne Junction. As of 2026, Fox Chase Line trains continue through Center City to the Chestnut Hill West Line on weekdays and the Paoli/Thorndale Line on weekends.

=== Beyond Fox Chase ===
Passengers changing over to a Newtown-bound Budd Rail Diesel Car at Fox Chase on November 24, 1981

SEPTA performing a test run of the British BRE-Leyland Diesel railbuses at Huntingdon Valley, September 1985. Note brand new SEPTA "lollipop" station sign at right and "Station for Lease" sign on the now-demolished station shelter.

Under the Reading Company Budd Rail Diesel Cars (RDCs) operated through from the Reading Terminal in downtown Philadelphia to Newtown. The Reading extended electrification to Fox Chase on September 29, 1966; limited diesel shuttles from Fox Chase to Newtown continued. SEPTA suspended these shuttles on July 1, 1981, as part of a systemwide discontinuation of non-electrified service. The shuttles returned on October 5 as the Fox Chase Rapid Transit Line. The operation of the line was troubled: the RDCs were in poor mechanical condition, SEPTA's decision to use transit division employees from the Broad Street Subway caused labor issues, and ridership was low. SEPTA suspended service again on January 18, 1983.

Since 1983, there has been interest from Bucks County passengers in resuming service to Newtown. In anticipation of a possible resumption, SEPTA performed extensive track upgrades in 1984. Street crossings in Newtown and Southampton received brand new welded rail, which were secured using sturdy Pandrol clips vs. traditional rail spikes. Though not promoted, this work was done in order to comply with a federal grant.

By March 1985, SEPTA gave into political pressure and made a concerted effort to integrate the non-electrified Fox Chase-Newtown line into the rest of its all-electrified commuter system. A $10 million plan to restore service to Newtown and Pottstown using British Rail-Leyland diesel railbuses was considered, with a test run reaching Newtown on September 3. Though the trial runs were relatively successful, ride quality was lackluster. Burdened with ongoing budgetary problems, SEPTA decided against the purchase of the railbuses.

In March 1987, SEPTA received several bids from private operators interested in running diesel-hauled trains to Newtown (as well as between Norristown and Pottstown). The operators suggested using non-union workers, which SEPTA was against. In addition, funding for these operations was allegedly questionable, and the SEPTA board rejected all offers.

Beginning in 2009, portions on the line within Montgomery County have been converted into a rail trail. By 2015, the Pennypack Trail extended 5.4 miles (8.7 km) along the former line between Rockledge and Byberry Road near Bryn Athyn. Additional trackage was in Southampton was dismantled in October 2018, though several townships along the line are still hoping for resumption of rail service to alleviate traffic congestion on local roads and highways.

== Stations ==
Fox Chase trains make the following station stops after leaving the Center City Commuter Connection. Stations indicated in gray background are closed. Although SEPTA suspended service to all stations north of Fox Chase in 1983 and has since converted most of the northern portion of the line to a rail trail, it continues to list those stations in its public tariff.

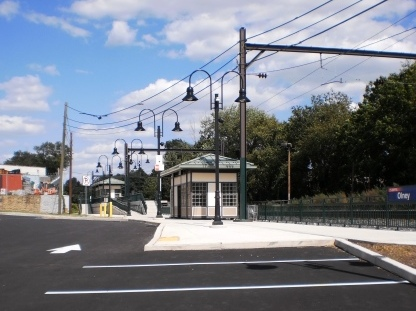
Olney station

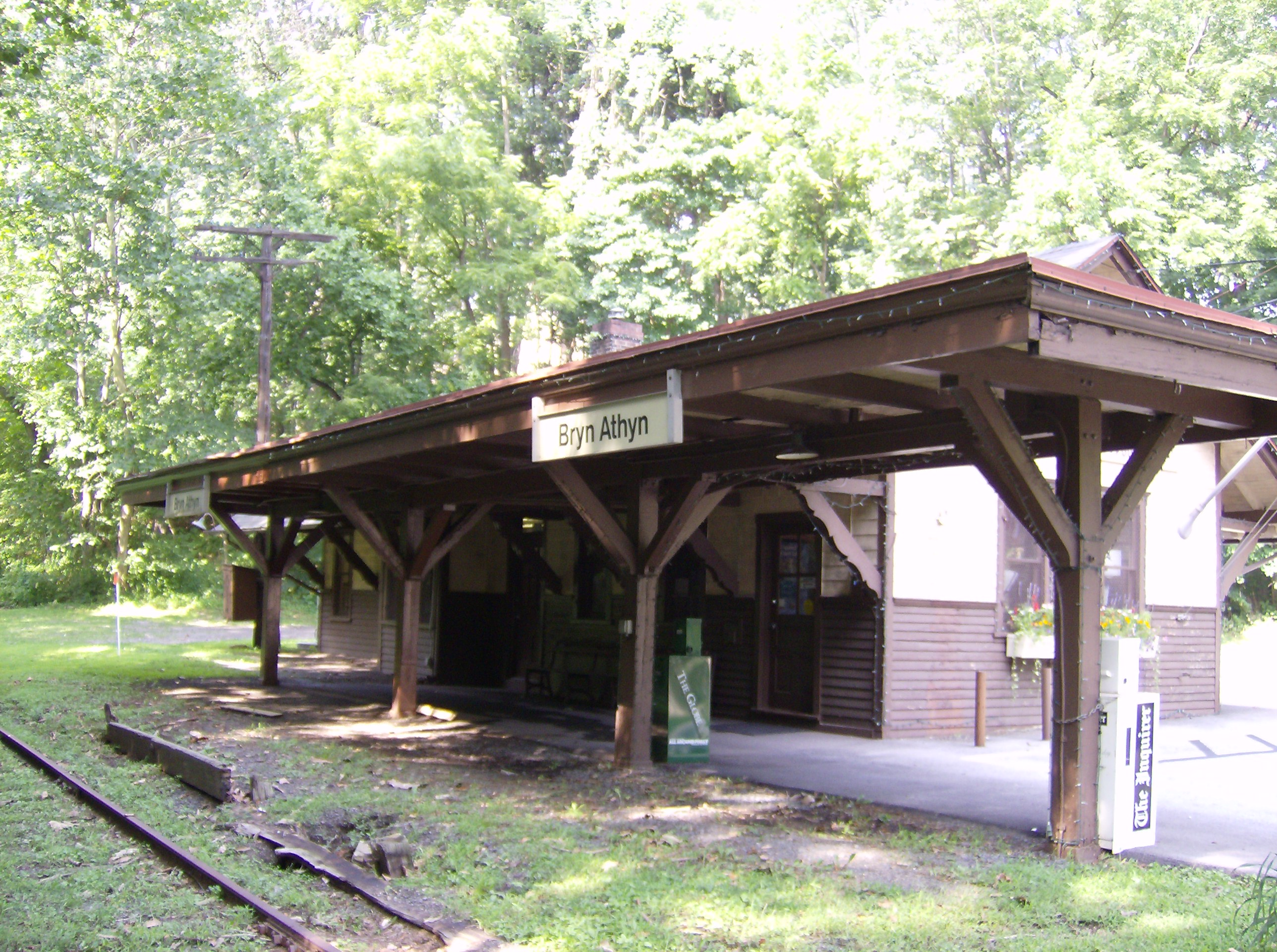
Bryn Athyn in 2008

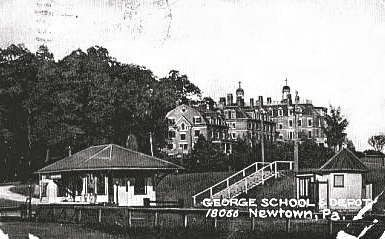
The original George School station

Zone	Location	Station	Miles (km) from Center City	Connections / notes
C	Temple University	Temple University	2.1 (3.4)	SEPTA Regional Rail: all lines SEPTA City Bus: 3, 23, 47
C	Nicetown–Tioga, Philadelphia			
C	Nicetown–Tioga, Philadelphia	Tioga		Closed 1989
C	Nicetown–Tioga, Philadelphia	Nicetown		Closed November 14, 1988 due to fire damage
1	Nicetown–Tioga, Philadelphia	Wayne Junction	5.1 (8.2)	SEPTA Regional Rail: SEPTA City Bus: 2, 23, 53; SEPTA Trackless Trolley: 75
1	Olney, Philadelphia	Olney	7.3 (11.7)	SEPTA City Bus: 8
2	Lawncrest, Philadelphia	Crescentville		Closed March 26, 1978
2	Lawndale, Philadelphia	Lawndale	9.0 (14.5)	
2	Cheltenham	Cheltenham	9.7 (15.6)	
2	Fox Chase, Philadelphia	Ryers	10.1 (16.3)	SEPTA City Bus: 70, 77
2	Fox Chase, Philadelphia	Fox Chase	11.1 (17.9)	SEPTA City Bus: 18, 24, 28
3	Huntingdon Valley	Walnut Hill	12.8 (20.6)	Closed January 18, 1983
3	Huntingdon Valley	Huntingdon Valley	14.4 (23.2)	Closed January 18, 1983
3	Bryn Athyn	Bryn Athyn	15.1 (24.3)	Closed January 18, 1983
4	Huntingdon Valley	Woodmont	17.2 (27.7)	Closed in 1965
4	Upper Southampton Twp.	County Line	18.0 (29.0)	Closed January 18, 1983
4	Upper Southampton Twp.	Southampton	18.9 (30.4)	Closed January 18, 1983
4	Upper Southampton Twp.	Churchville	20.8 (33.5)	Closed January 18, 1983
4	Northampton Twp.	Holland	22.4 (36.0)	Closed January 18, 1983
4	Newtown Twp.	George School	25.0 (40.2)	Closed January 18, 1983
4	Newtown	Newtown	26.3 (42.3)	Closed January 18, 1983

== Ridership ==
Yearly ridership on the Fox Chase Line between FY 2013–FY 2019 remained steady around 1.2-1.4 million before collapsing during the COVID-19 pandemic. (Note: Data for individual lines is not available for FY 2020.)
