= Woodmont station =

Woodmont

General information
- Location: Byberry Road and Reading Way; Huntingdon Valley, Pennsylvania 19009
- Coordinates: 40.15769°N 75.0722°W
- Platforms: 1 side platform
- Tracks: 1

History
- Closed: 1966 (approximately)

Former services
Preceding station	Reading Railroad	Following station
Bryn Athyn toward Philadelphia	Newtown Branch	Southampton toward Newtown
Location

Woodmont station is a former railroad station in Huntingdon Valley, Pennsylvania. It was located on Byberry Road and Reading Way in Lower Moreland Township, Pennsylvania. It formerly served the Reading Railroad's Newtown Line.

== History ==
Woodmont station was an early closure on the Newtown line, with trains bypassing the stop by the late 1960s. All traces of the former Woodmont station were removed by the 1970s. The Newtown line itself became a part of SEPTA's Fox Chase Rapid Transit Line, which ceased operation on January 14, 1983, due to failing diesel train equipment. Surviving trackage has been removed and replaced with a rail-trail.
