= Pennypack Trail =

Multi-use trail in Southeast Pennsylvania

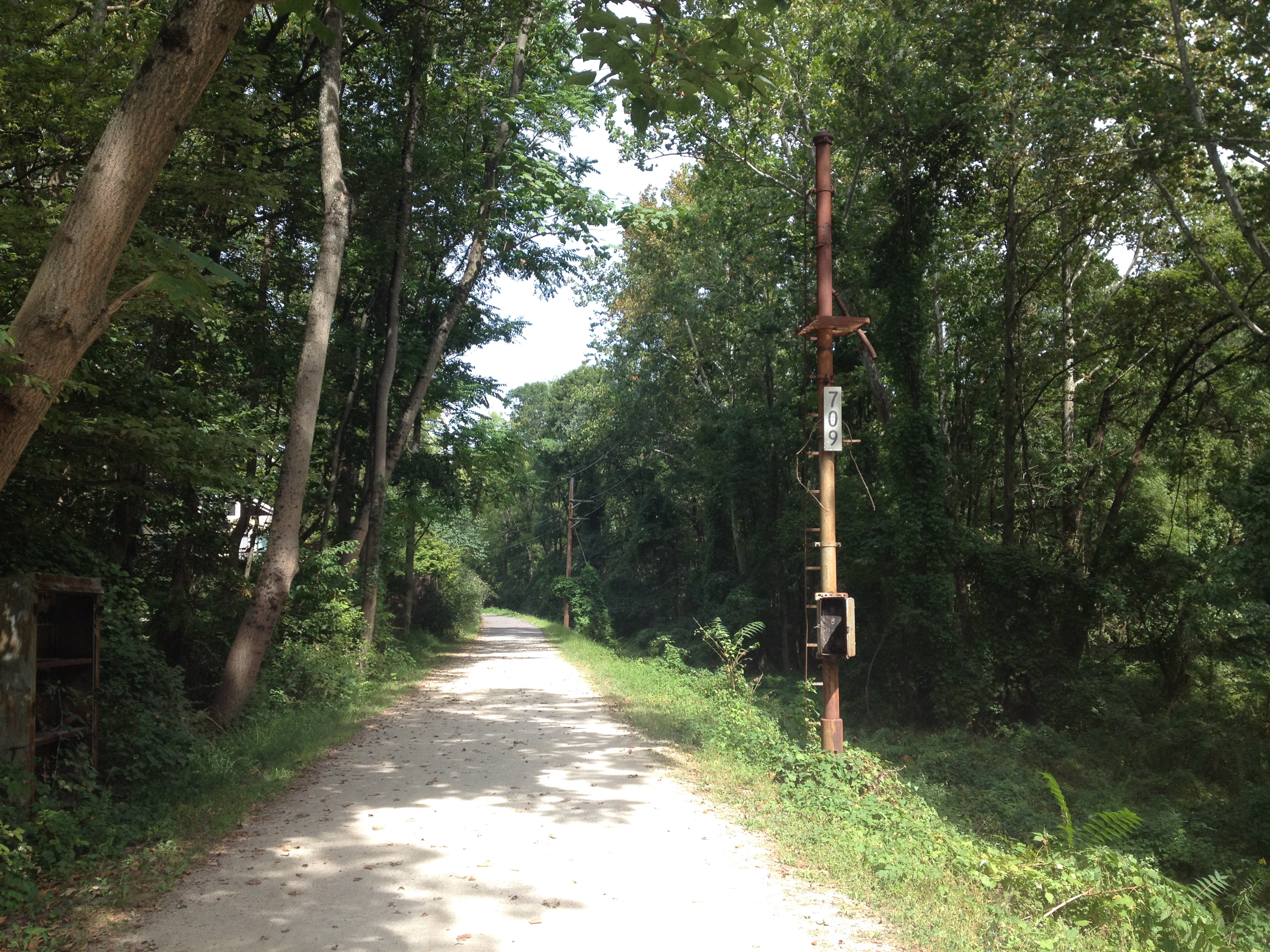
- Pennypack Trail north of Lorimer Park, with a former railroad signal pole visible
- Length: 6.2 mi (10.0 km)
- Trailheads: Rockledge, Pennsylvania; 40°05′05″N 75°05′01″W; Byberry Road; 40°09′26″N 75°04′22″W
- Use: Multi-use, non-motorized
- Season: Year-round, no winter maintenance
- Surface: Crushed stone

The Pennypack Trail is a rail trail located in eastern Montgomery County, Pennsylvania in the United States. The trail runs 6.2 miles (10.0 km) from Rockledge north to the County Line Road border with Bucks County in Huntingdon Valley (an extension completed in May 2021) along the former alignment of SEPTA's Fox Chase-Newtown Line. The trail is maintained by the Montgomery County Division of Parks, Trails, & Historic Sites.

== Route ==
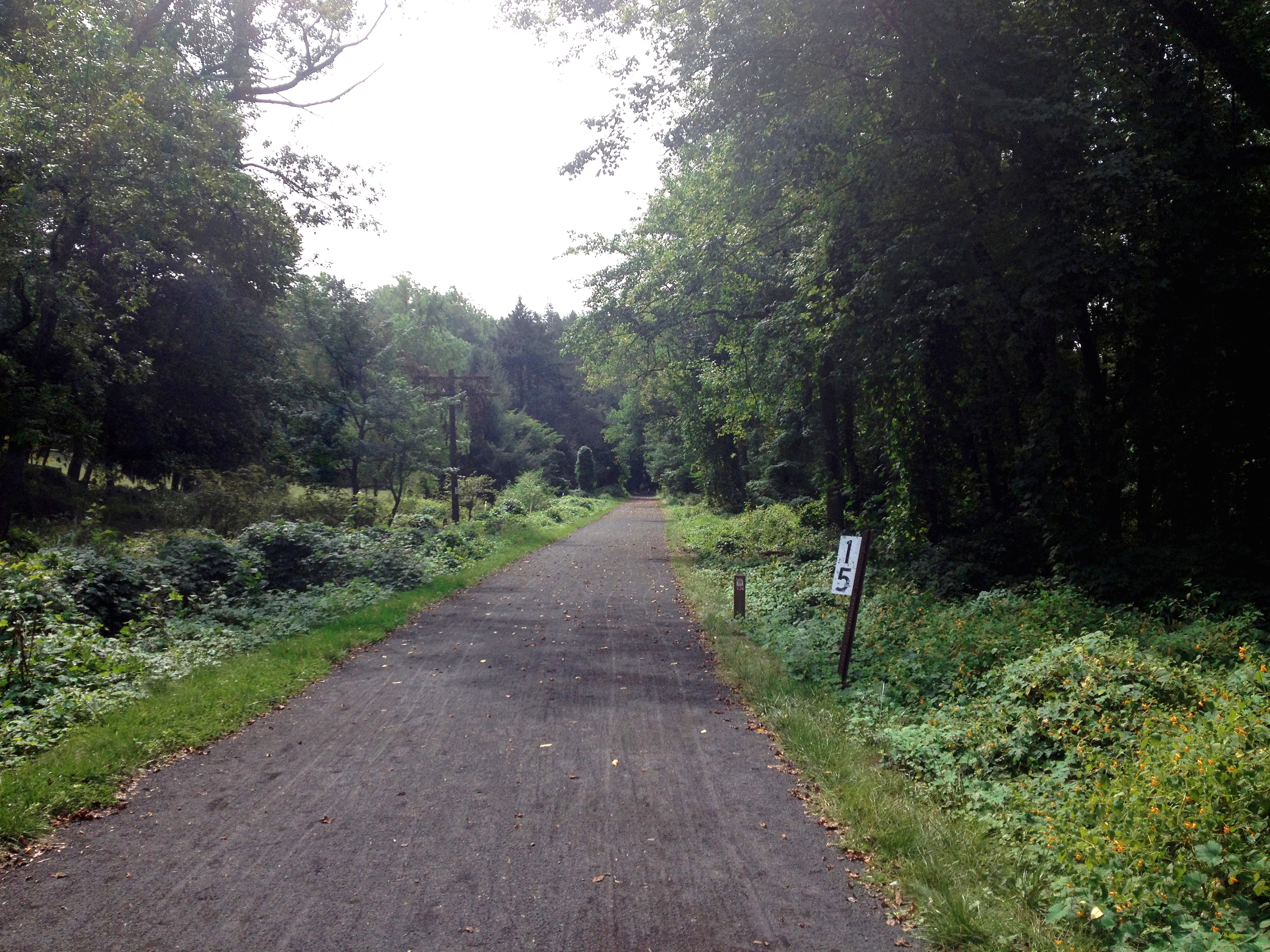
Pennypack Trail south of Bryn Athyn station, with former telegraph pole and Conrail-era milepost visible

Montgomery County's Pennypack Trail begins in the borough of Rockledge near Rockledge Borough Park at the intersection of Robbins and Rockledge avenues near the Philadelphia border. This trailhead is less than a mile from the northern terminus of Philadelphia County's Pennypack Trail, which runs north from the Delaware River at Holmesburg.

After beginning, the trail passes over Shady Lane before heading over a stream valley on a 165-foot (50 m) long, 35-foot (11 m) high bridge. From here, the Pennypack Trail continues north into Abington Township and forms the western border of Lorimer Park, which has a trail network along with parking, picnic areas, restrooms, and water fountains. Here, the trail crosses Moredon Road and begins to run parallel to Pennypack Creek on the west bank. Past here, the trail heads north and crosses the creek before passing under Pennsylvania Route 232 (Huntingdon Pike).

The trail enters Lower Moreland Township and heads across the Pennypack Creek again before coming to a grade crossing with SEPTA's West Trenton Line. The trail heads across the Bethayres Swamp before it reaches Pennsylvania Route 63 (Welsh Road). The trail crosses Terwood Road before it heads across the Pennypack Creek on a 165-foot (50 m) long bridge and then enters Bryn Athyn. The Pennypack Trail crosses Fetters Mill Road near the former Bryn Athyn station (which now serves as a post office) then north through the Pennypack Ecological Restoration Trust. Near Creek Road, the trail passes the site of a train wreck in 1921 where two trains collided head-on.

The trail previously terminated at Byberry Road in Bryn Athyn. On May 11, 2021, an extension north to County Line Road at the Bucks County border opened, which crosses under both a Norfolk Southern Railway bridge and the Pennsylvania Turnpike. A connection at County Line Road links the Pennypack Trail to the partially-completed Newtown Rail Trail which will eventually extend to Newtown, Bucks County.

== History ==
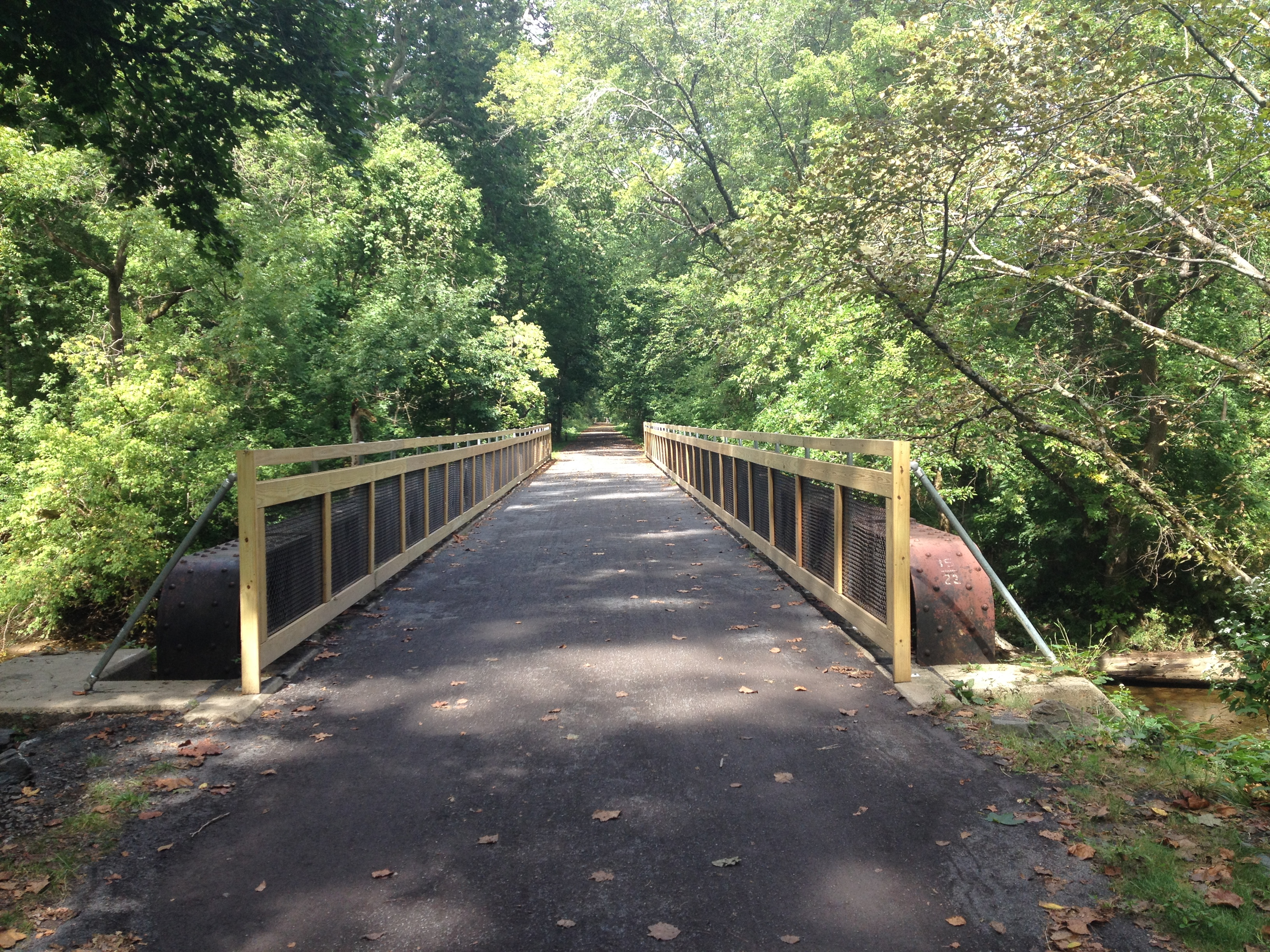
Pennypack Trail passing over Pennypack Creek on a former railroad bridge north of Bryn Athyn station

What is now the Pennypack Trail was originally part of the Philadelphia, Newtown and New York Railroad, a railroad line that ran from Philadelphia north to Newtown. The line was part of the Reading Railroad system and was electrified between Center City Philadelphia and Fox Chase with service between Fox Chase and Newtown powered by diesel trains. Passengers traveling from north of Fox Chase had to transfer from diesel to electric trans in Fox Chase, and vice versa. In 1976, the Reading Railroad became a part of Conrail. SEPTA acquired operation of the line in 1981, which became its Fox Chase-Newtown Line. In January 1983, SEPTA suspended service between Fox Chase and Newtown because of low ridership, a labor dispute, and failing diesel equipment on this section of line, which lacked electrification.

In 2009, Montgomery County leased the line from SEPTA for $1 and the rails were removed and sold. SEPTA retains complete ownership of the corridor for future passenger rail service. The rail trail was extended north from Welsh Road to Byberry Road on September 18, 2015.
