= Fox Chase station =

SEPTA Regional Rail station

Fox Chase
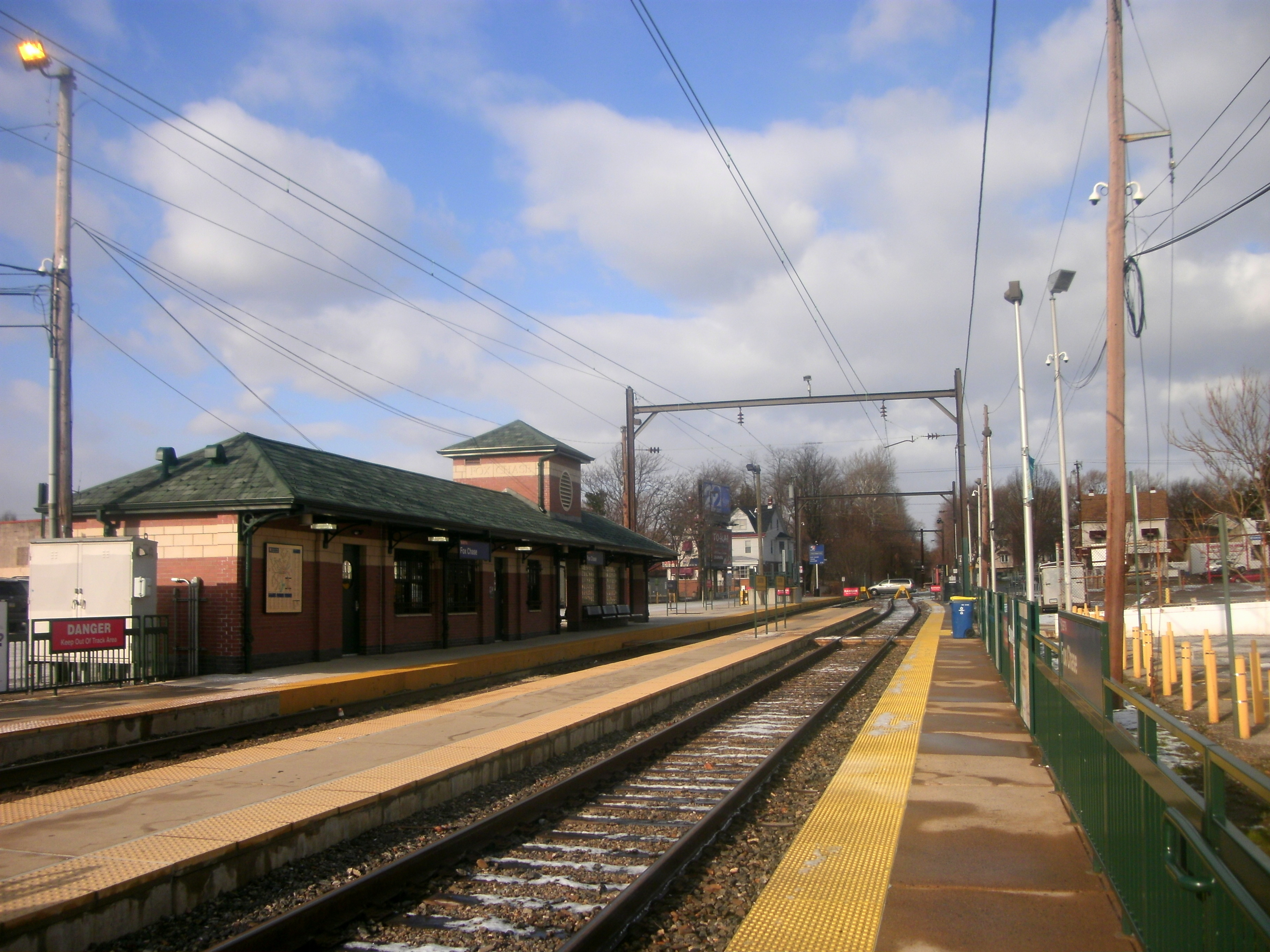
- Fox Chase station in December 2012

General information
- Location: 442 Rhawn Street; Philadelphia, Pennsylvania 19111
- Coordinates: 40.076643°N 75.082487°W
- Owner: SEPTA
- Line: Fox Chase Branch
- Platforms: Spanish solution (2 side platforms, 1 island platform)
- Tracks: 2
- Connections: SEPTA City Bus: 18, 24, 28

Construction
- Parking: 342 spaces
- Accessible: Yes

Other information
- Fare zone: 2

History
- Opened: February 4, 1878

Passengers
- 2017: 1,446 boardings 1,091 alightings (weekday average)
- Rank: 7 of 146

Services
Preceding station	SEPTA	Following station
Ryers toward Penn Medicine Station	Fox Chase Line	Terminus
Former services
Preceding station	SEPTA	Following station
Ryers toward Reading Terminal	Newtown Line	Walnut Hill (closed 1983) toward Newtown
Preceding station	Reading Railroad	Following station
Cheltenham toward Philadelphia	Newtown Branch	Huntingdon Valley toward Newtown
Location

Fox Chase Station is a SEPTA Regional Rail station located in Philadelphia, Pennsylvania. Located near the intersection of Rhawn Street and Rockwell Avenue in the Fox Chase neighborhood, it is the current terminus of the former Newtown Line, as service was cutback to Fox Chase in 1983, in which trains to Newtown were suspended. This station has a large number of parking spaces of any on the line (342), which is the closest regional rail stop to Philadelphia's Fox Chase and Bustleton areas, and to Rockledge and Huntingdon Valley in Montgomery County. It is also the closest station to the Fox Chase Cancer Center, which is a National Cancer Institute designated Comprehensive Cancer Center.

The station has two tracks and passengers board and exit at ground level. There is a wheelchair ramp at the north end of the station, though it requires a request to the train staff to utilize. South of the station, the two tracks merge into one and shortly after, it crosses Oxford Avenue (PA 232) on the line's only grade crossing.

Just north of the station, the now closed portion of the line crosses Rhawn Street at grade and continues into the woods although both tracks are now blocked off with bumper blocks before the road crossing.

SEPTA rebuilt the station area and ticket office in Summer 2010, using funds provided by the American Recovery and Reinvestment Act of 2009. In FY 2017, Fox Chase station was the seventh busiest station in the SEPTA Regional Rail system, with a weekday average of 1,446 boardings and 1,091 alightings.
