= Bryn Athyn train wreck =

Train accident in 1921

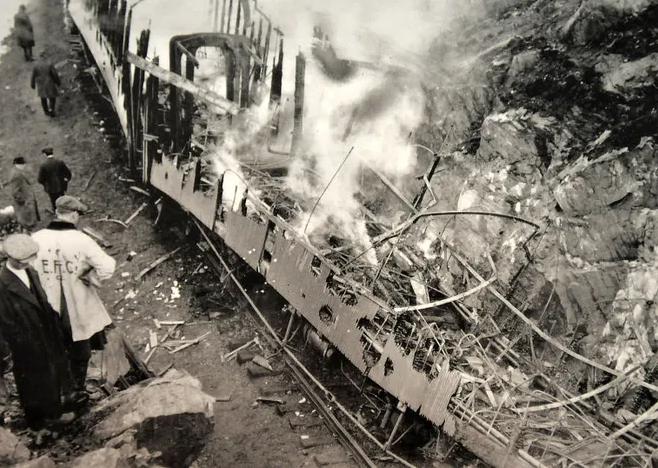
- A photograph taken of the 1921 Bryn Athyn train wreck

Details
- Date: December 5, 1921; 7:55 am
- Location: Bryn Athyn, Pennsylvania
- Coordinates: 40.1473°N 75.0773°W
- Country: United States
- Operator: Philadelphia & Reading Railway
- Incident type: Collision, fire
- Cause: Human error

Statistics
- Deaths: 27
- Injured: 70

The Bryn Athyn train wreck occurred on December 5, 1921, when a head-on collision occurred on a single line of track near Bryn Athyn station in Pennsylvania, United States. The collision resulted in a fire and claimed 27 lives while injuring 70 others.

== Background ==
The railway was a single track coordinated by time-tables and train orders. Before leaving the station, the engineers would be given written orders in regards to the expected rail traffic. The first train, No. 151, consisted of a 4-6-0 camelback locomotive, a combine car (#489), and two passenger cars (#1093 & #1071). It had departed from Philadelphia traveling northeast. On this same route was Train No. 154, a milk train, that was running late. Train 151 had pulled into a siding to allow No. 154 to pass. The engineer had been given written orders to wait for No. 154, but to also wait for Train No. 156, another passenger train that would be traveling this railway. However, the conductor of Train 151 overlooked these orders and proceeded after No. 154 had passed, despite the block signal being down, meaning the train was supposed to remain stopped.

== Accident ==
At 7:55 am, Trains 151 and 156 collided about 1.2 miles from the Bryn Athyn station. The result of the collision spilled hot coals onto the wooden floors of the cars and resulted in a fire. In total, 27 persons were killed in the wreck, including the firemen of the two trains. The conductor and engineer on both trains survived the accident; those who served on train No. 151 served time in prison for the accident.
