= Newtown station (SEPTA) =

Railway station in Pennsylvania, United States

Newtown
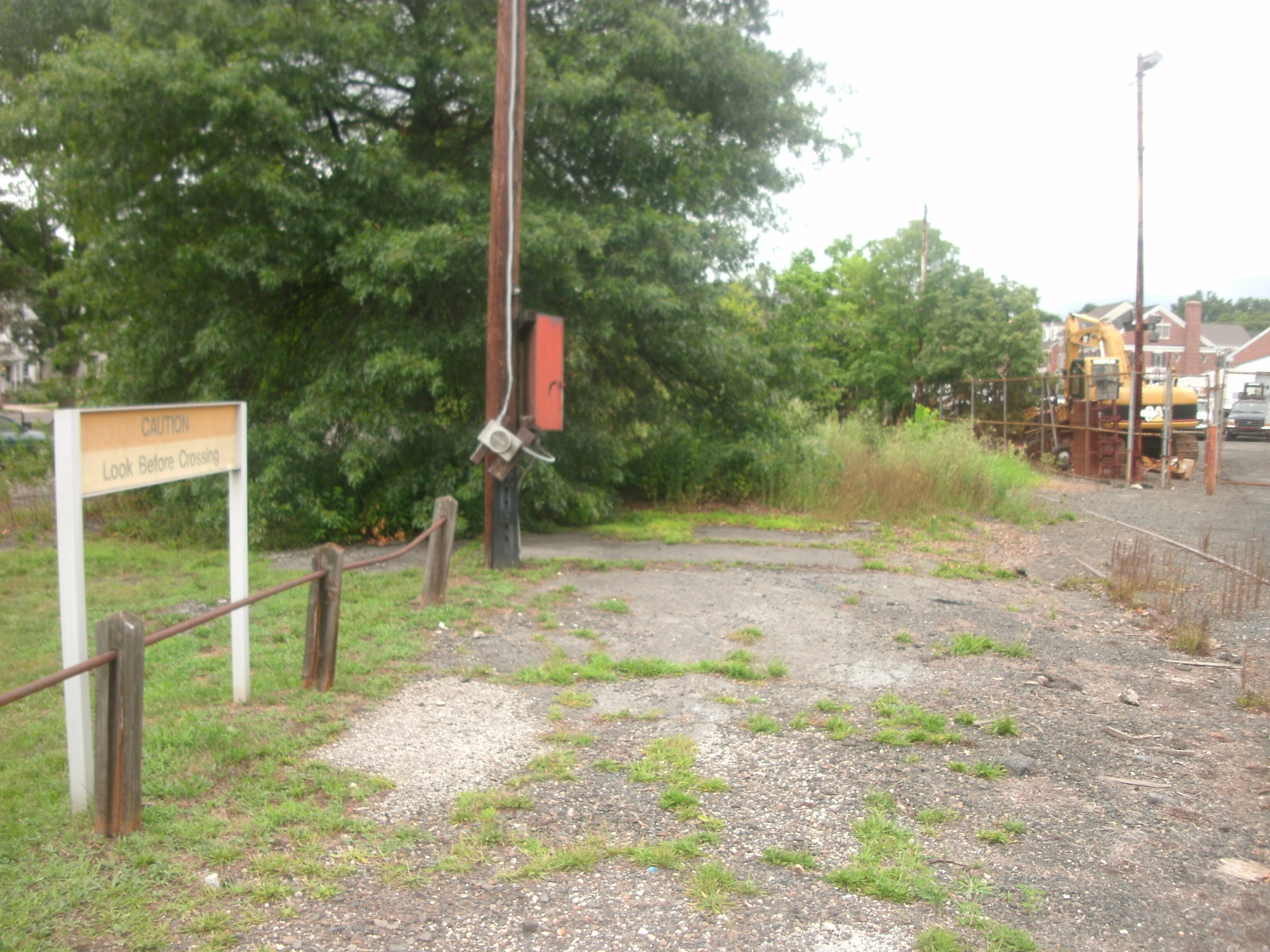
- Newtown station site in July 2012. Platform and signage remain.

General information
- Location: Penn Street; Newtown, Pennsylvania
- Coordinates: 40.2266°N 74.9312°W
- System: Former railroad station
- Owner: SEPTA
- Platforms: 1 side platform
- Tracks: 3
- Connections: Terminal station

Construction
- Structure type: Station shelter (demolished)
- Parking: 20

History
- Opened: February 4, 1878
- Closed: January 18, 1983

Former services
Preceding station	SEPTA	Following station
George School toward Reading Terminal	Newtown Line	Terminus
Preceding station	Reading Railroad	Following station
George School toward Philadelphia	Newtown Branch	Terminus
Location

Newtown Station is a defunct railroad station in Newtown, Bucks County, Pennsylvania. Built by the Reading Railroad, it later served SEPTA Regional Rail's Fox Chase/Newtown Line. SEPTA closed the station in 1983.

== History ==
Reading Railroad built the station in 1873 as the terminus of its line. In the railroad's original plans, the line was to continue to the north, but this expansion was never built. The building was torn down in 1960, and a new shelter was constructed in 1976. It later became a part of SEPTA's Fox Chase Rapid Transit Line. The station, and all of those north of Fox Chase station, was closed on January 18, 1983, due to failing diesel train equipment.

SEPTA experimented with the line by operating the Fox Chase–Newtown diesel segment as the Fox Chase Rapid Transit Line. SEPTA insisted on utilizing transit operators from the Broad Street Subway as a cost-saving factor, while Conrail requested that railroad engineers run the service. This was a result of a labor dispute that began when SEPTA inherited approximately 1,700 displaced employees from Conrail. When a federal court ruled that SEPTA had to use Conrail employees in order to offer job assurance, SEPTA cancelled Fox Chase–Newtown trains.

Service in the diesel-only territory north of Fox Chase was cancelled at that time, and the Newtown station still appears in publicly posted tariffs.

Although rail service was initially replaced with a Fox Chase–Newtown shuttle bus, patronage remained light, and the Fox Chase–Newtown shuttle bus service ended on November 30, 1998. The Newtown station shelter was torn down in 2004.
