= Joseph C. Gilpin =

- Occupation: Businessman
- Spouse: Lydia Nichols

Joseph C. Gilpin was a 19th-century American businessman and early railroad executive, based in Delaware.

== Career ==
In 1832, he helped found the Wilmington Fire Insurance Company, along with James Canby, Edward Tatnall, Éleuthère Irénée du Pont, Jacob Pusey, William P. Brobson, James Price, and Edward W. Gilpin.

Between at least 1829 and 1835, Gilpin was a director of the Wilmington branch of the Farmers' Bank of Delaware.

In 1833, he was an officer of the Delaware Coal Company.

In 1838, Gilpin was a director of the Wilmington and Susquehanna Railroad, one of the four railroad companies that built the first rail link from Philadelphia, Pennsylvania, to Baltimore, Maryland. (The line is today part of Amtrak's Northeast Corridor.) His service as a railroad executive is noted on the 1839 Newkirk Viaduct Monument, located in Philadelphia.

== Personal life ==
Gilpin married Lydia Nichols on January 1, 1825.

== See also ==
- List of people associated with rail transport
- List of people from Wilmington, Delaware
