= David C. Wilson (businessman) =

American businessman (1789–1865)

3rd Mayor of Wilmington, Delaware
- In office 1843–1845
- Preceded by: Nicholas Williamson
- Succeeded by: Alexander Porter

Personal details
- Born: 1789
- Died: March 30, 1865 (aged 75–76) Wilmington, Delaware, U.S.
- Party: Whig
- Occupation: Politician, banker, businessman, railroad executive

David C. Wilson (1789 – March 30, 1865) was an American politician, banker, businessman and railroad executive. A member of the Whig Party, he served as the third mayor of Wilmington, Delaware, from 1843 to 1845.

Wilson was part of various investment groups and companies. He was a founding director of the Delaware Fire Insurance Company, organized on August 19, 1825. He became a director of the Farmers' Bank of Delaware in 1825, and served as its president from January 5, 1843, to March 31, 1845. On February 15, 1839, he was named a commissioner of the Union Bank of Delaware. On March 12, 1844, he became a founding director of the Wilmington and Brandywine Cemetery Company.

In the late 1830s, he became a director of the Philadelphia, Wilmington, and Baltimore Railroad, formed from the merger of companies that created the first rail link from Philadelphia to Baltimore. (The main line survives today as part of Amtrak's Northeast Corridor.) His service as a railroad executive is noted on the 1839 Newkirk Viaduct Monument in Philadelphia.

Wilson helped organize the First Board of Trade of Wilmington, which was created "for the better organization and regulation of the trade and business of Wilmington", and whose founders included such local business leaders as Charles I. du Pont, Mahlon Betts, James Canby, William P. Brobson, and Jonas Pusey. Wilson was named its first president on January 3, 1837; he was also serving in the job in 1850.

In 1846, he was brigade inspector for the New Castle Country's militia.

Wilson also served on various public boards. In 1848, he was appointed by Wilmington's mayor to an 8-member board to examine the condition of the municipal Water Works. In 1852, he was one of the first members of the new Wilmington Board of Education.

Wilson built several houses and other buildings in and around Wilmington. In 1840, his three-story house on the corner of 4th and Shipley Streets was badly damaged in a fire. In 1845, he built a four-story mercantile building at Market and Fifth Streets. In 1826, he bought and sold a cotton mill on the Brandywine River.

Wilson, a member of the Whig Party, served as an alderman of Wilmington in 1841 and as the city's mayor from 1843 to 1845.

Wilson died in Wilmington on March 30, 1865, and was buried in Presbyterian Church Cemetery.

== See also ==
- List of mayors of Wilmington, Delaware
