= William Chandler (businessman) =

American businessman/railroad executive (fl. 1820-1850)

William Chandler was a 19th-century businessman based in Wilmington, Delaware, an active abolitionist, and an early railroad executive.

In 1818, Chandler served on the Wilmington City Council.

In 1825, he helped organize the Delaware Fire Insurance Company.

Chandler participated in several business ventures and abolitionist societies with Thomas Garrett, a Wilmington merchant and stationmaster on the Underground Railroad.

In 1827, the 25-year-old Abolition Society of the State of Delaware was reorganized as the Delaware Abolition Society, whose officers and directors included Chandler, Garrett, president John Wales, vice-president Edward Worrell, and others.

In 1829, he was elected a director of the Farmers' Bank of Delaware.

In 1833, he became a director of the Wilmington Whaling Company.

In 1835, Chandler and Garrett became directors of the new Wilmington Gas Company, which made gas "made from rosin, at $7 per 1,000 cubic feet" for lighting lamps. In 1836, he and Garrett invested with Joseph Whitaker and Whitaker's brothers to revive the Principio Furnace in Perryville, Maryland.

In 1837, he helped found and was named first vice-president of the First Board of Trade of Wilmington.

In 1838, Chandler was a director of three of the four railroad companies that were built the first rail link from Philadelphia to Baltimore: the Wilmington and Susquehanna Railroad, the Delaware and Maryland Railroad, and the Philadelphia, Wilmington, and Baltimore Railroad. (The line is today part of Amtrak's Northeast Corridor.) His service as a railroad executive is noted on the 1839 Newkirk Viaduct Monument.

From 1840 to 1843, Chandler served as a director of the Union Bank of Delaware.
