= James Price (businessman) =

- Born: 1776; Kent County, Maryland
- Died: June 10, 1840 (aged 63–64); Wilmington, Delaware, United States
- Occupations: Miller, businessman, banker, railroad executive
- Known for: First president of the Union Bank of Delaware
- Spouse: Margaret Price (m. 1802)
- Children: 4

James Price (1776 – June 10, 1840) was a miller, businessman, banker, and railroad executive based in Wilmington, Delaware.

== Early life ==
Born to a wealthy family in Kent County, Maryland, Price moved to Wilmington in his youth. He invested in Joseph Tatnall's mills in Brandywine, Delaware. In 1802, he married Tatnall's daughter, Margaret, with whom he had four children between 1804 and 1809.

== Career ==
In 1802, Tatnall also bought the Rotheram Mills, and moved into the c.1740 brick house built by Joseph Rotheram, a Quaker who had immigrated to the American colonies in 1723.

After his father-in-law died in 1813, Price became a co-owner of Tatnall's milling operations, along with brothers-in-law Thomas Lea and Edward Tatnall and Tatnall relative James Canby.

Price later became the first president of the Union Bank of Delaware. He also served as a director of three railroads that together built the first rail link from Philadelphia to Baltimore: the Philadelphia, Wilmington and Baltimore Railroad, the Delaware and Maryland Railroad, and the Wilmington and Susquehanna Railroad. His service is noted on the 1839 Newkirk Viaduct Monument. In 1837, he became the second president of the W&S, after James Canby resigned.

== Death ==
Price died on June 10, 1840, in Wilmington.
