= Union Bank of Delaware =

Bank in Delaware (1839–1943)

The Union Bank of Delaware was a bank that operated in Wilmington, Delaware, from 1839 until its acquisition by Wilmington Trust in 1943.

It was chartered as a state bank on February 15, 1839, and was "soon recognized as one of the leading financial institutions in the state". On June 20, 1865, it was certified as a national bank and subsequently renamed the Union National Bank. In January 1887, it was reorganized as a National Bank.

Among its founding commissioners were Edward Tatnall, James A. Bayard Jr., William Lea, and Mahlon Betts. James Price was its first chairman. Its first cashier was William P. Brobson. James Canby was an early president. Later officers included Isaac Starr, Victor Du Pont, and Preston Lea.

In 1943, the bank was acquired by Wilmington Trust.
