= Tatnall =

Tatnall may refer to:

== People ==
- David Tatnall (born 1955), Australian photographer
- Edward Tatnall (1782–1856), American railroad executive and miller, son of Joseph Tatnall
- Francis Gibbons Tatnall (1896–1981), American engineer and entrepreneur
- Joseph Tatnall (1740–1813), American Quaker merchant, miller and banker

== Other uses ==
- Tattnall County, Georgia, United States
- Tatnall School, New Castle County, Delaware, a private college preparatory private school
