= Henry Whitely =

- Occupations: businessman, politician

Henry Whitely was a businessman, railroad executive, and Federalist politician from the U.S. state of Delaware.

== Background ==
In 1816, Whitely, along with James Price and eight others, were appointed commissioners of the planned Wilmington and Christiana Turnpike.

In 1818, he bought a stone house and 100 acres of land in Newark, Delaware. (The house still stands today; in 1983, it was added to the National Register of Historic Places.)

From October 1817 through September 1821, Whitely served in the Delaware House of Representatives.

In 1824, he was elected to the state Senate as a delegate from New Castle County. (That same year, he was part of a group of dignitaries appointed to escort the Marquis de Lafayette from the Pennsylvania state line to Wilmington.) He served as the Speaker of the Senate in 1827, during the 51st Assembly.

In 1833, he became a director of the Farmers' Bank of Delaware.

In 1838, he was a director of two of the four railroads that together built the first railroad south from Philadelphia: the Delaware and Maryland Railroad and the Wilmington and Susquehanna Railroad. His service as an early railroad executive is marked on the 1839 Newkirk Viaduct Monument. Much of the right-of-way is today owned by Amtrak as part of its Northeast Corridor.
