= Francis Barry =

Francis Barry may refer to:

- Sir Francis Barry, 1st Baronet (1825–1907), British businessman and politician
- Francis Barry, president of the Farmers' Bank of Delaware from 1868 to 1878

== See also ==
- Frank Barry (disambiguation)
