= Newkirk Viaduct Monument =

Sculpture by Thomas Ustick Walter

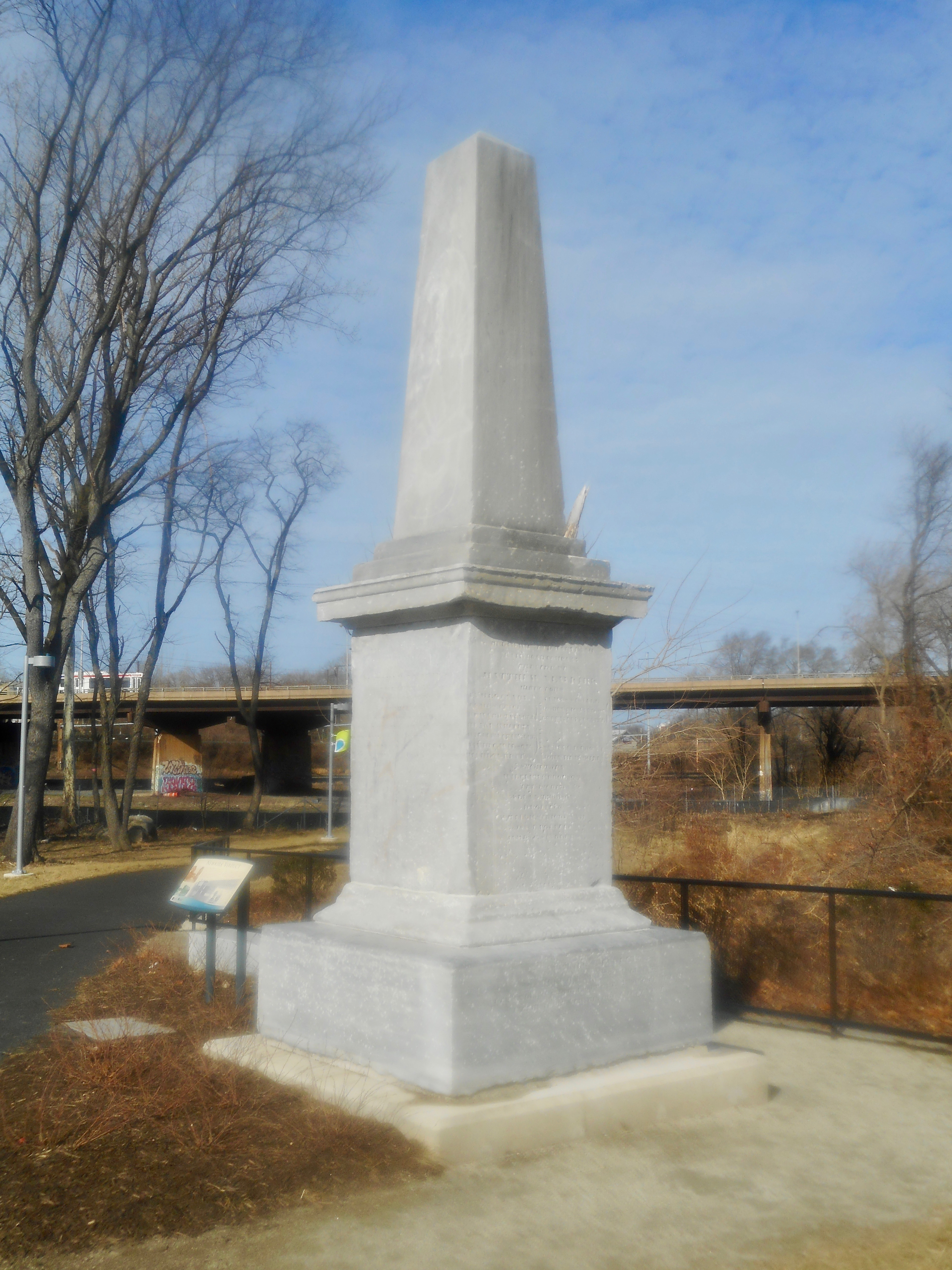
- 2018 photo shows the monument by the Schuylkill River Trail with the Grays Ferry Bridge in the background
- Interactive map of Newkirk Viaduct Monument
- Location: West Philadelphia
- Coordinates: 39.9400°N 75.2063°W
- Designer: Thomas Ustick Walter
- Type: obelisk
- Material: white marble
- Width: 5 feet (1.5 m)
- Height: 14 feet (4.3 m)
- Completion date: 1839
- Dedicated to: Matthew Newkirk
- Moved from original location sometime after 1927. Moved to current location in 2016.

The Newkirk Viaduct Monument (also, Newkirk Monument) is a 15-foot (4.6 m) white marble obelisk in the West Philadelphia neighborhood of Philadelphia, Pennsylvania. It was installed in 1839 to mark the completion of the Newkirk Viaduct, the first permanent railroad bridge over the Schuylkill River. It is inscribed with the names of 51 railroad builders and executives, among other information.

Designed by Thomas Ustick Walter, a future Architect of the Capitol, the monument was erected by the Philadelphia, Wilmington and Baltimore Railroad to mark its completion of a bridge across the Schuylkill River and the first railroad line south from Philadelphia. The monument originally sat about 700 feet (210 m) from the riverbank. Between 1927 and 1930, it was moved about 600 feet (180 m) further inland, where it sat for decades by the main line that became Amtrak's Northeast Corridor. In 2016, it was moved to its present location, about 100 feet (30 m) from the river's edge at the north end of the Bartram's Mile section of the Schuylkill River Trail.

== History ==
The monument commemorates the 1838 completion of the Newkirk Viaduct, also called the Gray's Ferry Bridge, over the Schuylkill River. The bridge completed the first direct rail line between Philadelphia and Baltimore, Maryland — tracks that closely paralleled the King's Highway, the main land route to the southern states.

On August 14, 1838, the PW&B board of directors decided to name the bridge after company president Matthew Newkirk (1794–1868), a Philadelphia business and civic leader, and to commission a monument at its west end. (Earlier in the year, the company gave Newkirk a silver plate worth $1,000 ($30,234 today) to reward him for arranging the merger of four railroads that together built the Philadelphia-Baltimore line.)

Designed by Thomas Ustick Walter, who would go on to design the dome of the U.S. Capitol, the white marble monument consists of seven pieces of carved stone held together simply by weight and friction — not reinforced, for example, with metal pins. The uppermost piece, a 7-foot (2.1 m) obelisk, weighs about 6,000 pounds (2,700 kg), while the 5-foot (1.5 m) base and other pieces weigh a rough total of 12,000 pounds (5,400 kg). The obelisk and base are inscribed with the names of 51 men, including senior officials of the four railroads and various employees who helped build the bridge and rail line.

The monument was installed along the western approach to the bridge and surrounded by a low iron fence. An 1895 account describes its location as "on a high bank in the angle formed by the junction of the Philadelphia, Wilmington and Baltimore Railroad and the Chester Branch of the Philadelphia and Reading Railway just below the western end of the Gray's Ferry Bridge." It sat about 700 feet (210 m) from the Schuylkill River, at 39.93975 north latitude, 75.20830 west longitude.

In 1872, the PW&B built a new mainline west of the Viaduct. It leased its old line to the Philadelphia and Reading Railway, which built a small railyard, surrounding the monument.

After a half-century, the monument had fallen into obscurity, except perhaps to vandals. "Surrounding the structure is an iron fence to protect it from vandalism, but it has, nevertheless, been a frequent target for irresponsible hoodlums," the Philadelphia Inquirer wrote in 1896. In 1900, the Philadelphia Record wrote of the monument: "On account of its inaccessibility and the dense foliage, it is scarcely ever seen."

=== Ca. 1920s move ===
By January 1926, the Pennsylvania Railroad was making plans to move the monument "because of the additional yard facilities which are required at that point. The understanding is that it will be placed on the present site of the Gray's Ferry Station. The engineering department of the Pennsylvania Railroad has the matter in charge."

The monument was indeed moved to the site of the now-demolished station on the north side of the 1872 mainline just northeast of the 49th Street Bridge, at 39.939492 north latitude, 75.210633 west longitude. It was moved sometime between May 1927, when an aerial photo shows it still in its original location, and September 1930, when the Philadelphia Inquirer ran a letter describing the monument in its new site. (In 1939, a retired Pennsylvania Railroad employee—perhaps having forgotten the actual year of the move—told the Delaware County Daily Times that the monument had been moved in late 1917 to make way for the "Hog Island Railroad"—formally, the 60th Street Branch of the Pennsylvania Railroad—and that three of Newkirk's daughters had been asked their permission for the move.)

For the next eight decades, the monument sat all but abandoned, in disrepair, and nearly forgotten, though it was visible to passengers traveling Amtrak's Northeast Corridor or SEPTA Regional Rail trains on the Airport Line and the Wilmington/Newark Line.

=== 2016 move ===
In 2013, interest in the Newkirk Monument was rekindled by a pair of articles written by Bradley Peniston for Hidden City Philadelphia, a local organization concerned with the built environment. The articles explored the monument's significance and suggested it be moved to a more visible site. Over the next few years, the idea was embraced and brought to fruition by a host of public and private entities, including Amtrak, Philadelphia Parks & Recreation, Schuylkill River Development Corporation, landscape architects Andropogon Associates, planners PennPraxis, conservators Materials Conservation, and movers with the George Young Company. On November 17–18, 2016, the monument was moved to a new concrete pad along the under-construction "Bartram's Mile" section of the Schuylkill River Trail.

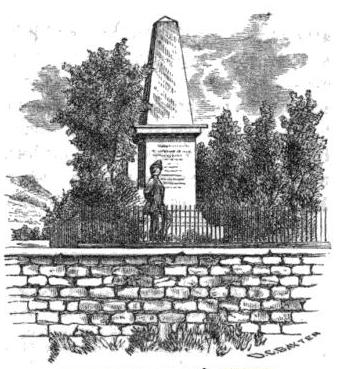
1856 Drawing

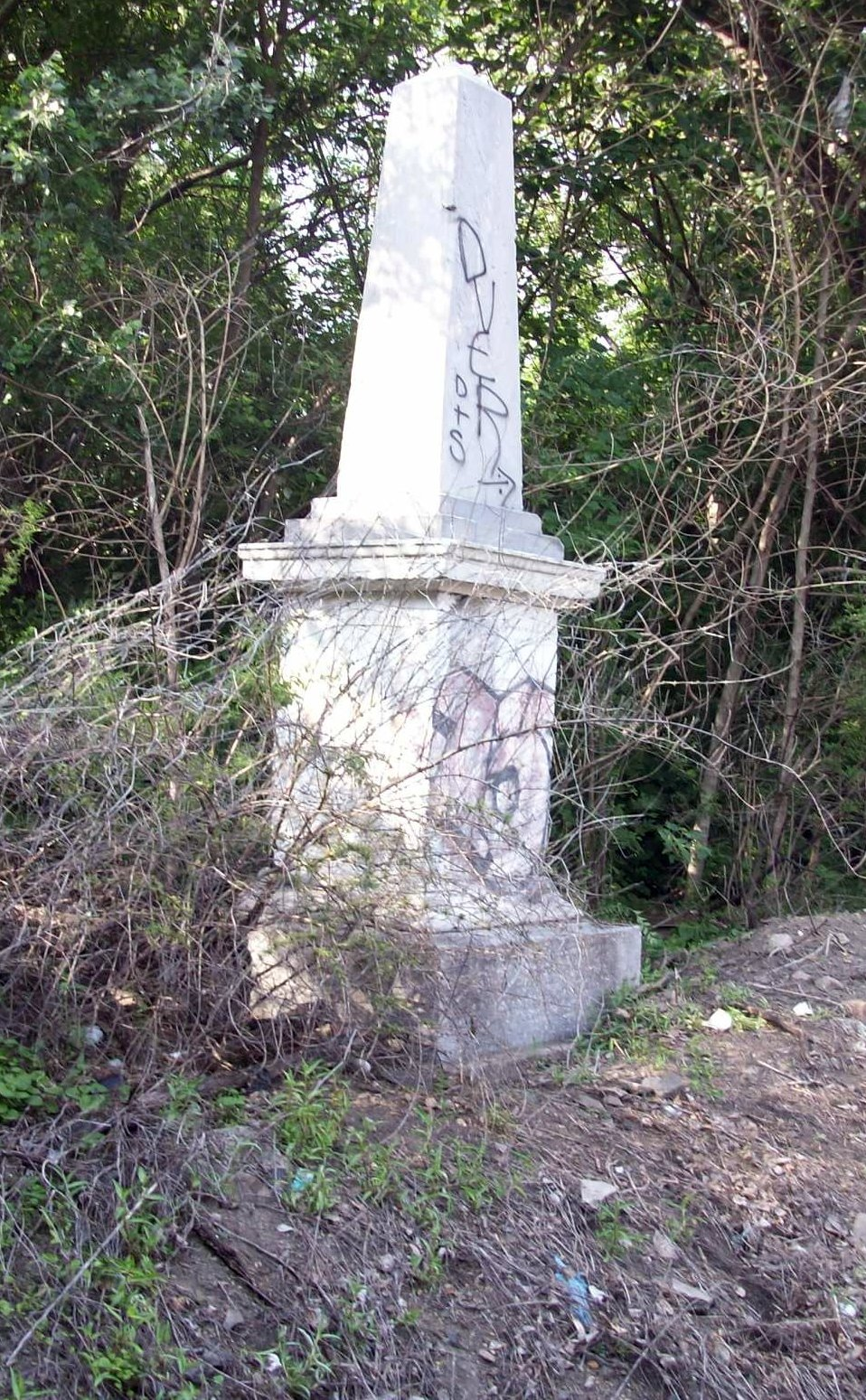
In 2009

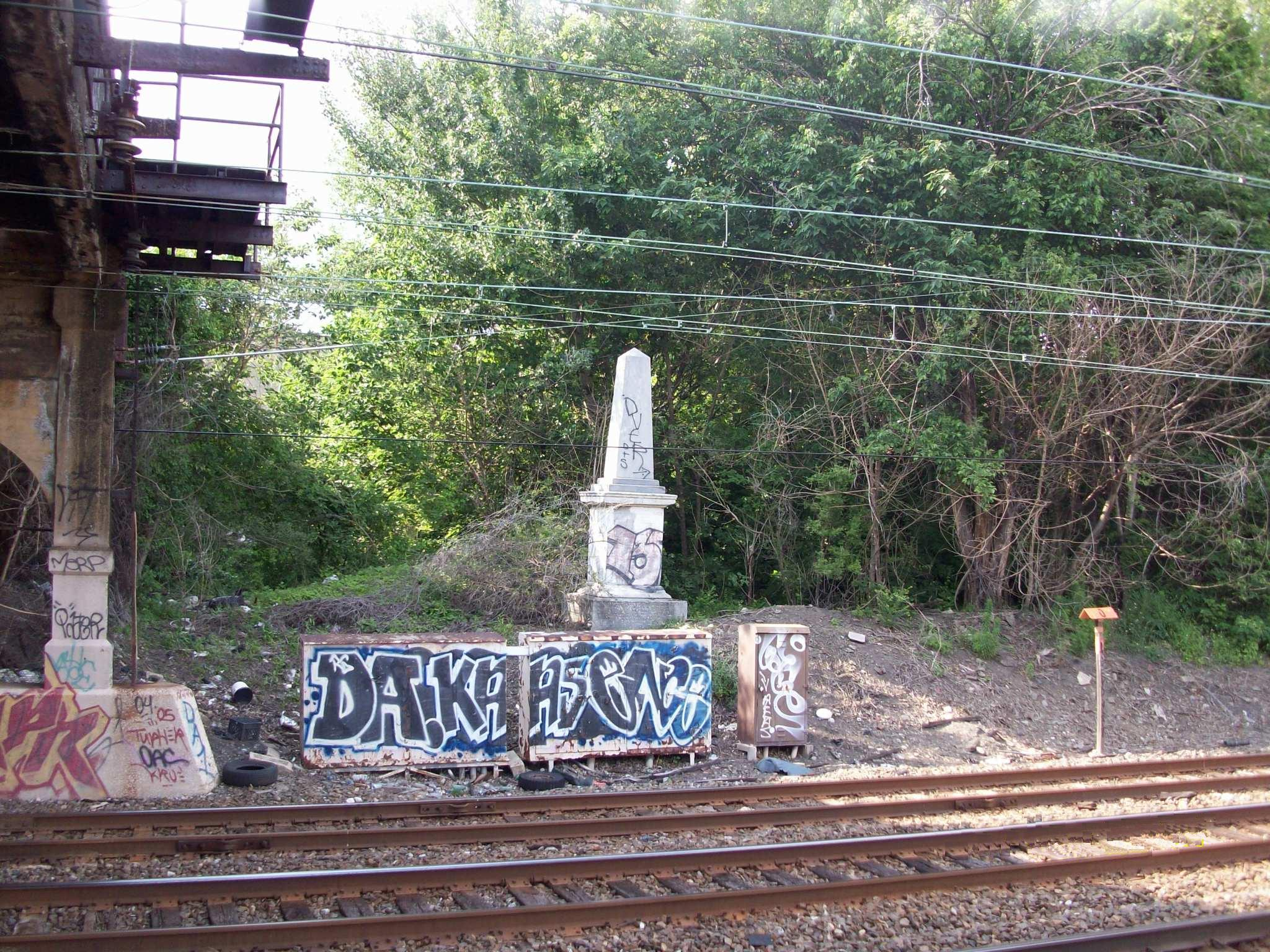
Monument as seen from tracks in 2009

== Inscription ==
As transcribed by Wilson, the four sides of the monument and its base are inscribed as follows:

Eastern face	Western face	Northern face	Southern face
Obelisk
PHILADELPHIA WILMINGTON AND BALTIMORE RAILROAD COMPANY President; MATTHEW NEWKIRK Vice President; JACOB J COHEN JR Directors; Philadelphia. Matthew Newkirk, John Hemphill, John Connel, Wm. D. Lewis. Wilmington. James Canby, James Price, David C. Wilson, James A. Bayard, William Chandler. Baltimore. J.J. Cohen Jr., Chas. F. Mayer, John McKim Jr., James Swan, W.A. Patterson. Delaware. Thomas Smith. Chester. Solicitor, Samuel Edwards. Secretary, JAMES WILSON WALLACE, WILLIAM P. BROBSON, Ass't. Treasurer, ALLAN THOMSON. AUBRY H. SMITH, Ass't.	BALTIMORE AND PORT DEPOSIT RAILROAD COMPANY President; LEWIS BRANTZ Directors; Philadelphia. Matthew Newkirk. New York. Roswell L. Colt. Maryland. Chas. F. Mayer, J.J. Cohen Jr., John B. Howell, C.W. Karthouse, Fred'k Dawson, Henry Thomson, John C. Morton. Secretary and Treasurer, CHARLES H WINDER. Engineer, BENJAMIN H LATROBE. Assistant Engineer, HENRY R HAZELHURST.	DELAWARE AND MARYLAND RAILROAD COMPANY. President, MATTHEW NEWKIRK. Directors: Wilmington. James Canby, James Price, Edward Tatnell, Henry Whitely, Wm. Chandler, David Wilson, Mahlon Betts. Elkton. James Sewall, Josh. Richardson, Greenb'y Purnell, Secretary, Wm. P. Brobson. Treasurer, Allan Thomson. Engineer, WILLIAM STRICKLAND. Assistant Engineer, JAMES P. STABLER.	WILMINGTON AND SUSQUEHANNA RAILROAD COMPANY. President, JAMES CANBY. Directors; Philadelphia. Matthew Newkirk, John Hemphill, Stephen Baldwin, Samuel Jaudon. Elkton. James Sewall. Baltimore. J.J. Cohen Jr. Wilmington, David C. Wilson, James Price, William Chandler, Edward Tatnell, Joseph C. Gilpin, Mahlon Betts, Henry Whitely, Jas. A. Bayard. Secretary, WILLIAM P BROBSON. Treasurer, ALLAN THOMSON. Engineer, WILLIAM STRICKLAND. Assistant Engineer, JC TRAUTWINE.
Base
THE PHILADELPHIA WILMINGTON AND BALTIMORE RAILROAD COMPANY Formed A.D. 1838 by the Union of the several charters obtained from Pennsylvania, Maryland, and Delaware. Work commenced July 4, 1835. Completed December 25, 1838. Cost $4,000,000.	Railroad Contractors: William Slater, John Ahern, Beers & Hyde, Kennedy Lonergan Superintendents: Charles Lombaert, George Craig, Alfred Crawford	NEWKIRK VIADUCT Samuel H. Kneass, Engineer. Alexander and Charles Provost, Stone Masons. Uziel H. French, Bridge Carpenter.	NEWKIRK VIADUCT Commenced July 4, 1837. Completed December 25, 1838. S.H. Kneass, Engineer. Railroad from Philadelphia to Wilmington. Herman J. Lombaert, Asst. Eng'r.

Wilson's transcription contains several errors; for example, it misspells the last names of Henry Hazlehurst, Edward Tatnall, and Charles and Alexander Provest.
