= 50th Delaware General Assembly =

American legislative session

| ← | 49th | 51st | → |

Overview
- Legislative body: Delaware General Assembly
- Term: January 3, 1826 – January 2, 1827

The 50th Delaware General Assembly (1826–1827) was a meeting of the legislative branch of the state government, consisting of the Delaware Senate and the Delaware House of Representatives. Elections were held the first Tuesday of October and terms began on the first Tuesday in January. It met in Dover, Delaware, convening January 3, 1826, two weeks before the beginning of the third year of the administration of Governor Samuel Paynter.

The apportionment of seats was permanently assigned to three senators and seven representatives for each of the three counties. Population of the county did not affect the number of delegates. Both chambers had a Federalist majority.

== Leadership ==
=== Senate ===
- Charles Polk Jr., Kent County

=== House of Representatives ===
- Arnold Naudain, Sussex County

== Members ==
=== Senate ===
Senators were elected by the public for a three-year term, one third posted each year.

New Castle County

- John Erwin
- Christopher Vandegrift
- Henry Whiteley

Kent County

- William W. Morris
- Charles Polk Jr.,
- Presley Spruance Jr.

Sussex County

- Charles M. Cullen
- Jesse Green
- William N. Polk

=== House of Representatives ===
Representatives were elected by the public for a one-year term.

New Castle County

- James R. Black
- Samuel H. Black
- William P. Brobson
- Joseph W. Day
- Andrew Gray
- John Higgins
- Arnold Naudain

Kent County

- Martin W. Bates
- John Brinkle
- Joel Clements
- Elias Naudain Jr.
- William Saulsbury
- Thomas M. Stout
- Samuel Warren Jr.

Sussex County

- Francis Brown
- Joshua Burton
- Spencer Phillips
- John Robinson
- Whiting Sanford
  - Caleb S. Layton
- Purnal Tindall
- George Truitt

== Places with more information ==
- Delaware Historical Society; website; 505 North Market Street, Wilmington, Delaware 19801; (302) 655-7161.
- University of Delaware; Library website; 181 South College Avenue, Newark, Delaware 19717; (302) 831-2965.
