= William Lea (businessman) =

19th century American businessman (1805 – 1876)

William Lea (May 17, 1805 – December 28, 1876) was a member of a prominent flour milling family in Wilmington, Delaware, who was largely responsible for the development of the Brandywine Mills to their place of importance.

Lea was born to miller Thomas Lea (1757–1794) and Sarah Tatnall (eldest daughter of Joseph Tatnall) in a house at 1901 Market Street in Wilmington. He was a descendant of John Lea, a prominent Quaker minister from England, who came to America with William Penn on his second voyage. He was the father of Preston Lea, Governor of Delaware from 1905 to 1908.

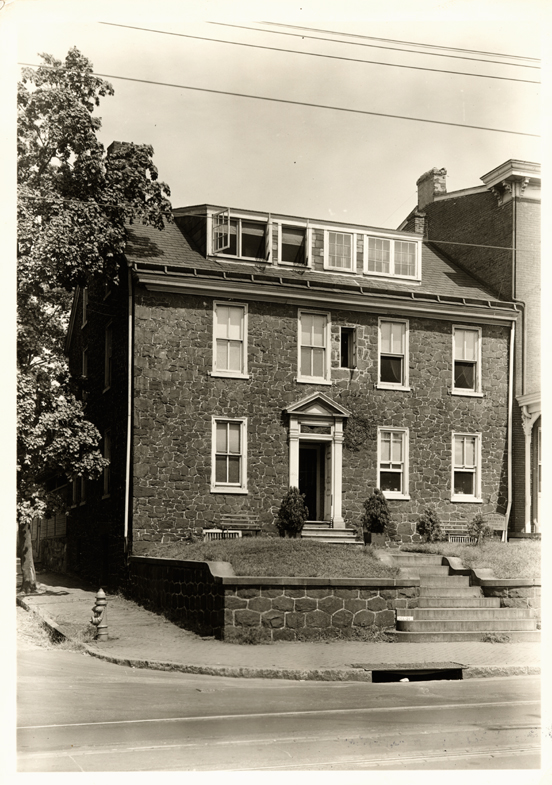
The William Lea house, 1901 N. Market Street in Wilmington. Photo by Willard Stewart in the 1930s

Lea was first employed with his father in the firm of Tatnall and Lea, founded in the 1760s on the north bank on the Brandywine Creek by his father and grandfather, and then at Manayunk, Pennsylvania; New Orleans, Louisiana; and Terre Haute, Indiana. He was married to Jane Scott Lovett on the October 18, 1836. He returned to his old home in Wilmington in 1837 and became one of the proprietors of the Brandywine Mills. The couple had 11 children together, William (b. 1834), Esther (b. 1837), Henry (b. 1839), Preston (b. 1841), Mary (b. 1846), Sarah (1848–1848), Anna (b. 1849), Edward (1852–1867), Alice (1854–1857), Thomas (1856–1859), and Jane (b. 1860). In 1864, the firm was renamed William Lea and Sons when Lea brought his sons, Henry and Preston, into the business.

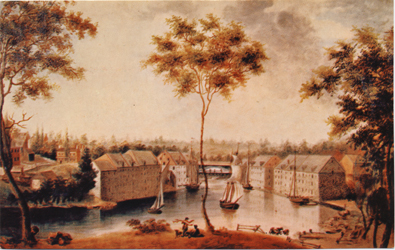
Brandywine Flour Mills in an 1840 painting by Bass Otis

Besides operating the flour mills, Lea was for many years a director in the Union National Bank of Wilmington, and was also a director in the Wilmington and Brandywine Cemetery Company. He was greatly interested in the improvement of Brandywine Village, in which he lived, and favored its annexation to the city of Wilmington as the Ninth Ward.

The Superfine Lane Condominiums (named for the grade of flour produced by the Quaker millers) were built in 1984 and incorporated the foundations of the old William Lea and Sons flour mills, which continued to operate 1923.
