= James P. Stabler =

American railroad engineer (1796-1840)

James P. Stabler (1796–1840) was a chief engineer for two of the earliest railroads in the United States.

== Early life and education ==
Born August 14, 1796, in Sandy Spring in Montgomery County, Maryland, James Pleasants Stabler was the son of Dr. William and Deborah Brooks Pleasants Stabler, who were friends with noted Quaker preacher Elias Hicks.

In 1824, he served as postmaster of Sandy Spring.

== Career ==
He was for a time the chief engineer and general superintendent of the Baltimore and Ohio Railroad. During that time, he supervised the survey and construction of the railroad from Baltimore, Ohio, southwest to The Relay, then to Ellicott City, Maryland, and then to Frederick County, Maryland.

He first married Elizabeth Gilpin Stabler, and in February 1830, married Sarah Bentley Briggs (1801-1886) of Alexandria, Virginia, a daughter of surveyor (and friend to Thomas Jefferson) Isaac Briggs.

In 1835, Stabler and his wife lived in Elkton, Maryland. That year, he was hired by the Delaware and Maryland Railroad as assistant engineer and superintendent of construction.

In 1836, he was hired as the chief engineer of the Wilmington and Susquehanna Railroad, based in Wilmington, Delaware, at an annual salary of $3,500 ($102,614 today).

Both the D&M and the W&S were part of the first rail line south from Philadelphia, Pennsylvania; much of their rights-of-way are today part of Amtrak's Northeast Corridor. His service with the D&M is noted on the 1839 Newkirk Viaduct Monument.

Late in the year, he fell ill, perhaps with tuberculosis; he returned to work in January 1837.

Later that year, Stabler purchased the house and grounds of his father-in-law, Isaac Briggs, for $1,000. (Named "Sharon," the estate remained in the family until 1911. Today, it is part of a convalescent and retirement home at 18201 Marden Lane in Olney, Maryland.)

He had at least one daughter, born in 1837, and two sons, including Pleasants Stabler and James P. Stabler, Jr. (1860–1901).

The W&S "dispensed with his services" on October 31, 1837. He was at the time attempting to cultivate silkworms for commercial silk production.

A finding aid for Stabler's family papers says he and his father-in-law Isaac Briggs were "men of education and attainment but good fortune did not seem to attend their best endeavors, though in their family connections were persons of wealth with whom they appear to have been on a basis of entire social equality. The whole family connection was fervent in its faith in the Quaker doctrine."

By 1838, he had returned to his home in Sandy Spring. He died there and was buried by Sandy Spring Friends Meeting House in 1840, aged 43.
