= Senator Betts (disambiguation) =

Thaddeus Betts (1788–1840) was a U.S. Senator from Connecticut from 1839 to 1840. Senator Betts may also refer to:

- Donald Betts (born 1978), Kansas State Senate
- Mahlon Betts (1795–1867), Delaware State Senate
