= William D. Lewis =

American banker and railway executive

William David Lewis (1792–1881) was a 19th-century banker, merchant, and railroad executive based in Philadelphia, Pennsylvania.

In 1832, Lewis hired future locomotive titan Matthias Baldwin to assemble a locomotive kit for the New Castle and Frenchtown Railroad; Baldwin completed the engine, named Delaware, later in the year. This experience allows Baldwin to build Old Ironsides, his first locomotive from scratch, later in the year.

Later in the 1830s, Lewis was a director of the Philadelphia, Wilmington, and Baltimore Railroad, which forged the first rail link between the cities. His service is noted on the 1839 Newkirk Viaduct Monument.

In 1839, Lewis was a director of the Philadelphia Museum Company. Founded by famed painter Charles Willson Peale (1741–1827), it was one of America's first museums. It went out of business in the 1850s, and the collection was sold for roughly $6,000 to P.T. Barnum and Moses Kimball.

In the 1840s, Lewis became president of the Catawissa Railroad.
