= James Sewall =

- Born: 1778
- Died: 1842 (aged 63–64)
- Spouse: Anna Maria Rudulph

James Sewall (1778-1842) was a U.S. officer in the War of 1812, public servant, and early railroad executive.

== Family ==
Sewall was the scion of a prominent Maryland family. His great-great-grandfather was Henry Sewall, who immigrated to St. Mary's County, Maryland, in 1660; became Secretary of the Province and Counselor; and received numerous parcels of land from Cecil Calvert, 2nd Baron Baltimore.

On February 14, 1809, he married Anna Maria Rudulph, daughter of Tobias Rudulph, a large landowner. Together, they had at least four children: James Sewall (1823-1881), Martha, Caroline, and Mary.

== Career ==
Sewall was the secretary of the Republican Party organization in Cecil County, Maryland, in 1810.

In 1811, he was elected president of the first bank in Elkton, Maryland.

In 1813, Major Sewall commanded the 2nd Battalion of the 49th Maryland Regiment in action against the British during the War of 1812. On April 29, forces under British Admiral George Cockburn, including nine ships, sailed up the Chesapeake Bay. They sacked Frenchtown, Maryland, but when they attempted to move up the Elk River to Elkton, they were repulsed by Sewall's forces at Fort Defiance, an earthenworks fortification a mile below the town. From 1816 to 1840, Sewall served as Clerk of the Circuit Court in Elkton.

In 1817, Sewall led the formation of the Elkton and Susquehanna Bridge Turnpike Company, a firm capitalized at $30,000 to build a road from Elkton to the Susquehanna River.

Sometime between 1810 and 1820, Sewall built Holly Hall on land inherited by his wife. The Elkton mansion was the family seat for some decades and in 1976 was added to the National Register of Historic Places. He helped found Trinity Episcopal Church in Elkton in 1832.

In the 1830s, he served as a director of the Delaware and Maryland Railroad and the Wilmington and Susquehanna Railroad, which joined two other railroads to create the first rail link from Philadelphia to Baltimore. (The main line survives today as part of Amtrak's Northeast Corridor.) His service as a railroad executive is noted on the 1839 Newkirk Viaduct Monument in Philadelphia.
