= Greenbury Purnell =

Greenbury Purnell (1794 – April 15, 1857) was an early railroad executive from the U.S. state of Maryland.

Purnell was born in Maryland. On December 22, 1835, he married Mary E. Megredy (b. December 30, 1805, in Elkton, Maryland). They had five children.

In 1838, he was secretary of the Delaware and Maryland Railroad, one of the four railroads that together built the first railroad south from Philadelphia, Pennsylvania. His service as an early railroad executive is marked on the 1839 Newkirk Viaduct Monument. Much of the right-of-way is today owned by Amtrak as part of its Northeast Corridor.

He died April 15, 1857, in Elkton.
