= Aubrey Henry Smith =

American lawyer

Aubrey Henry Smith (October 14, 1814 - April 14, 1891) was a lawyer, U.S. district attorney, and early officer of the Philadelphia, Wilmington, and Baltimore Railroad.

Smith graduated from the University of Pennsylvania in 1833.

He married Mary Rose (b. 1822?- ), a daughter of Robert C. Grier (1794-1870), who served as a justice of the United States Supreme Court from 1846 to 1870.

On January 4, 1837, he was admitted to the Philadelphia Bar, one of 15 that year.

In 1838, he was assistant treasurer of the Philadelphia, Wilmington, and Baltimore Railroad, which, along with three other railroads, built the first rail link from Philadelphia to Baltimore. His service as an early railroad executive is noted on the 1839 Newkirk Viaduct Monument.

In 1841, he purchased Printz Island, toward the eastern end of Little Tinicum Island in the Delaware River.

He was a member of both the Academy of Natural Sciences of Philadelphia and the American Philosophical Society.

In 1867, Smith published "On the colonies of plants observed near Philadelphia", the first of several scientific papers about the plants — often introduced from foreign lands — found on ballast heaps in the ports and wharves of New Jersey, New York, and Pennsylvania.

On April 5, 1869, he was appointed U.S. District Attorney for the Eastern District of Pennsylvania.

In 1876, he published a revised edition of "The Campaign Against Quebec," a history of the Revolutionary War campaign of 1775 by his grandfather, John Joseph Henry.

He was a member of the Union League of Philadelphia at least from 1876-78.
