= William P. Brobson =

American politician

William Parvin Brobson (1786–1849) was a lawyer, Delaware state representative, newspaper editor, and railroad executive.

He was admitted to the Delaware bar in 1810.

He was several times elected to the Delaware House of Representatives as a delegate from New Castle County, holding office in 1820–21, 1821–22, and 1826–27.

In 1825, he married Elizabeth Tatnall Starr, granddaughter of prominent Delaware businessman Joseph Tatnall.

Around 1834, he became the editor of the Delaware Journal (sometimes referred to the Delaware State Journal), a Wilmington, Delaware, newspaper founded in 1831. Historian John Thomas Scharf called him "a talented Wilmington lawyer of that day, and a clear, vigorous writer."

In 1835, Brobson became the secretary to the board of directors of the Wilmington and Susquehanna Railroad, one of the four railroads that built the first rail link from Philadelphia to Baltimore. In 1838, he was assistant secretary of the merged Philadelphia, Wilmington, and Baltimore Railroad. His service as an early railroad executive is noted on the 1839 Newkirk Viaduct Monument. Today, the right-of-way is owned by Amtrak and forms part of the Northeast Corridor.

In 1838, he became the first cashier for the Union Bank of Delaware.
