= Roswell L. Colt =

American businessman

Roswell Lyman Colt (1779-1856) was an American businessman who made a fortune in the shipping industry, served for decades as governor of the Society for Establishing Useful Manufactures, and was an early railroad executive.

Colt's parents were Peter Colt (1744-1824) and Sarah Lyman. (Peter's brother was Benjamin Colt (1740-1781), whose son Christopher Colt (1780–1850) had a son who became famous for being the gunmaker/inventor Samuel Colt (1814-1862).) A graduate of Yale University, Peter founded a shipping business that traded with the West Indies, served in the Revolutionary War, served as Connecticut State Treasurer from 1790 to 1794, and went on to help found Paterson, New Jersey. In 1793, he became the superintendent of the S.U.M., replacing Pierre L'Enfant, and later settled in Paterson.

Roswell Colt was born on July 20, 1779. In 1811, Roswell married Margaret Oliver (1790-1856), herself the heiress to a shipping fortune. In 1814, he took the post that was once his father's — governor of the S.U.M. — a job he would hold until 1850. He was a director of the Baltimore and Ohio Railroad and, after he bought 3,000 shares of the Baltimore and Port Deposit Railroad in 1835, a director of the B&PD as well. In 1838, the B&PD merged with three other railroads to create the first rail link from Philadelphia to Baltimore. (This main line survives today as part of Amtrak's Northeast Corridor.) Colt's service as a railroad executive is noted on the 1839 Newkirk Viaduct Monument in Philadelphia.

Roswell and Margaret had 13 children: Robert Oliver Colt (1812-1885), John Oliver Colt (1813-1858), James Craig Colt (1815-1865), Elizabeth Sarah Colt (1816-1823), Mary Devereux Colt (1817-1884), Roswell Lyman Colt (1821-Unknown), John Craig Colt (1822-1848), Emily Oliver Colt (1825-1830), Morgan Gibbs Colt (1826-1894), Thomas Oliver Colt (1829-1869), Margaret Oliver Colt (1830-1871), Ellen Craig Colt (1831-Unknown), and Julia Colt (1835-1909).

He died in Paterson on November 22, 1856.

Morgan Colt was his grandson, through his son Morgan.
