= Brandywine Village =

Historic neighborhood of Wilmington, Delaware

Coordinates: 39°45′8″N 75°32′27″W

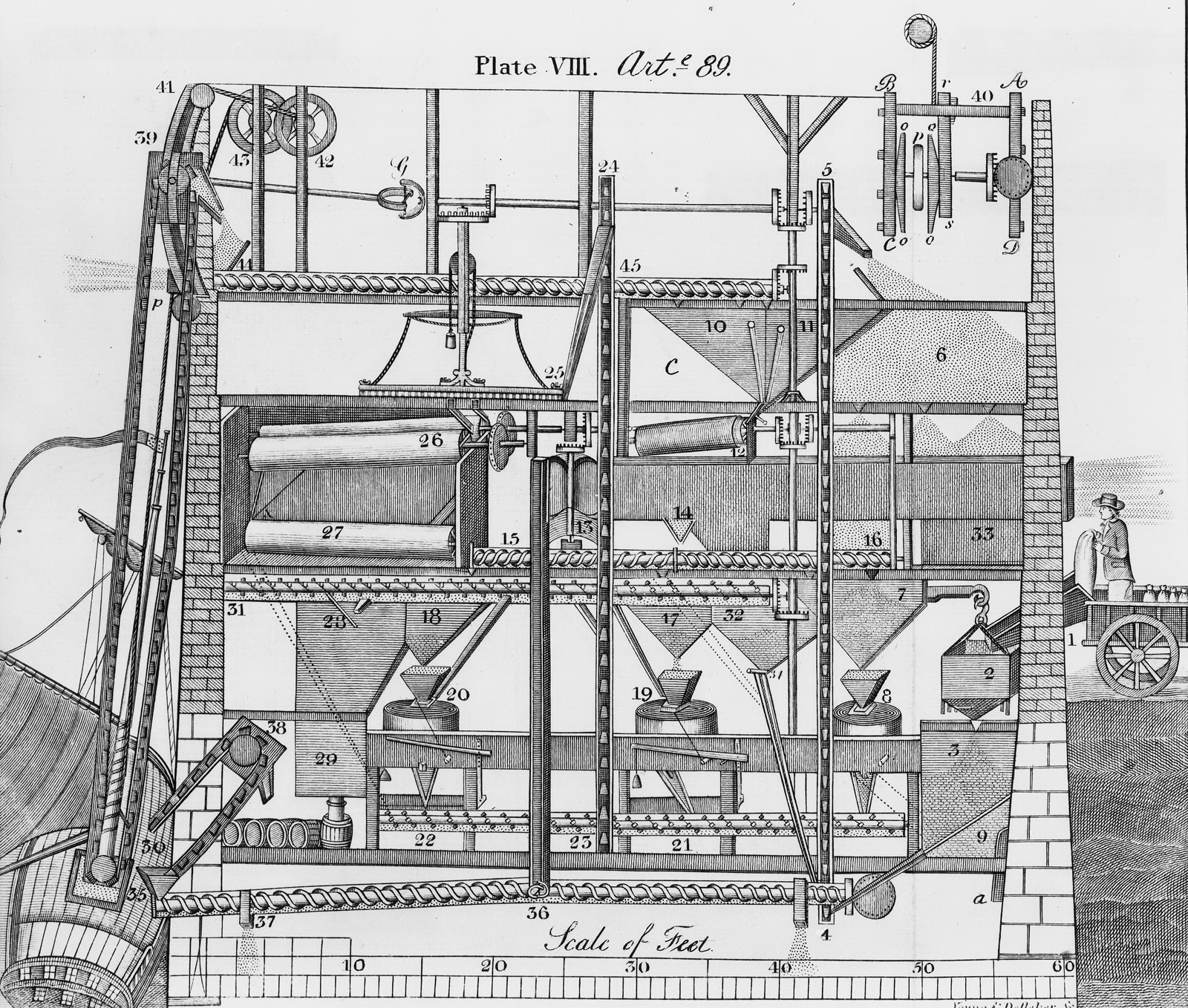
Oliver Evans's design for automated flour milling

Brandywine Village was an early center of U.S. industrialization located on the Brandywine River in what is now Wilmington, Delaware.

The Brandywine crosses the Fall Line just north of Wilmington, and descends from about 160 feet (49 m) above sea level in Chadds Ford to just a few feet above sea level in Wilmington. The river's descent allowed manufacturers — notably, of flour and gunpowder — to use high-powered machinery in the days before the steam engine, while its navigable channel to the Delaware River and Delaware Bay allowed them to load oceangoing ships.

== History ==
By 1687, a Swedish colonist, Tyman Stidham opened the first mill on the Brandywine, near Wilmington. About 1735, Brandywine Village was founded across the creek from Wilmington. Quakers Elizabeth Levis Shipley, her husband William Shipley, and Thomas Canby were important in establishing the village and its supporting flour mills. By 1743, Thomas's son Oliver owned 3 mill sites. A dam and a millrace south of the creek had been built.

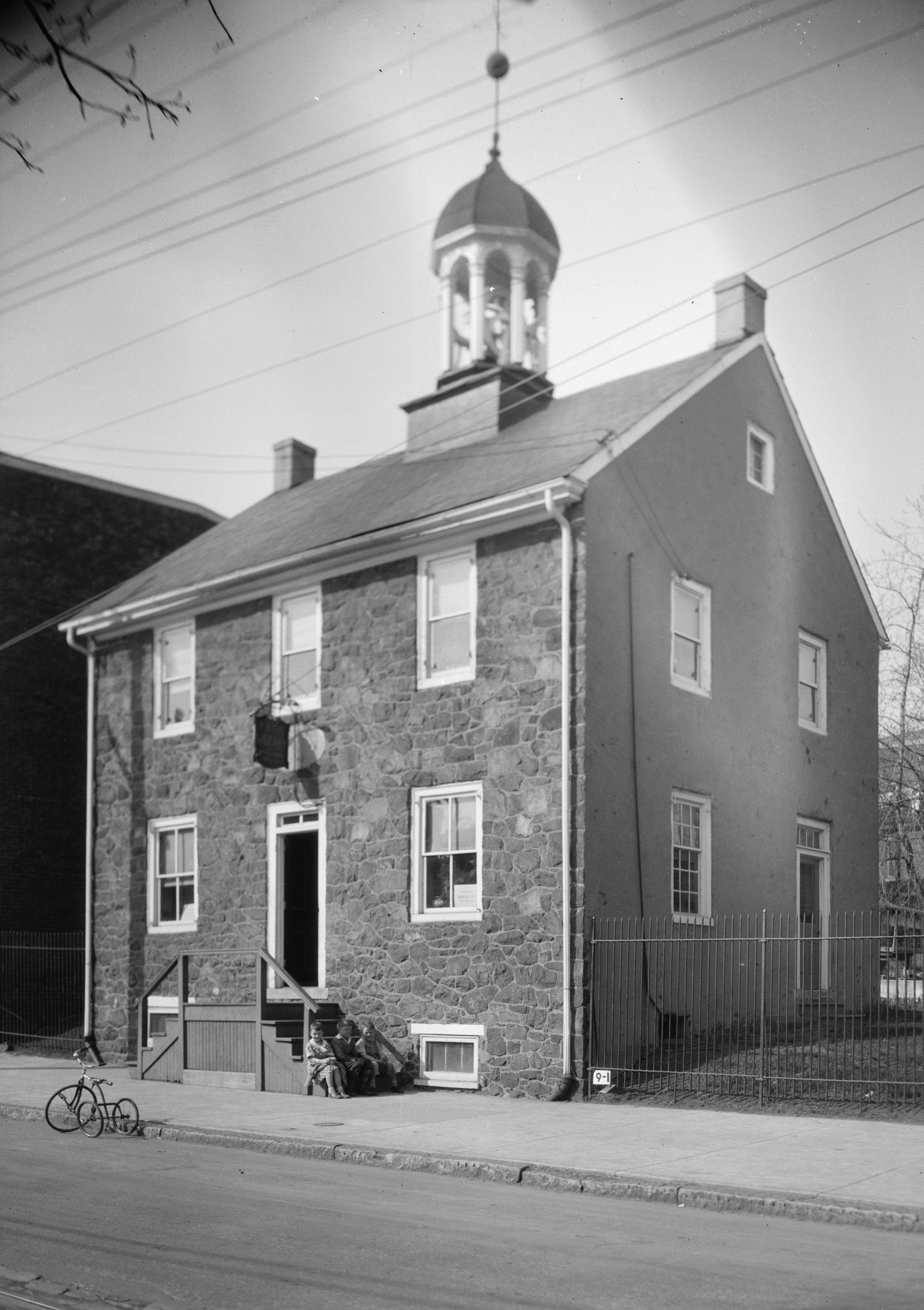
The Brandywine Academy building

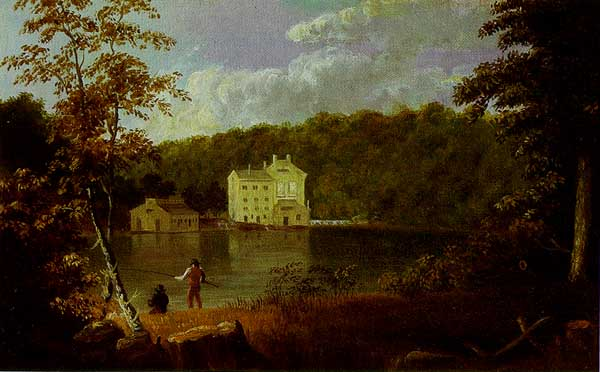
Gilpin's Mill on the Brandywine attributed to Thomas Doughty circa 1827.

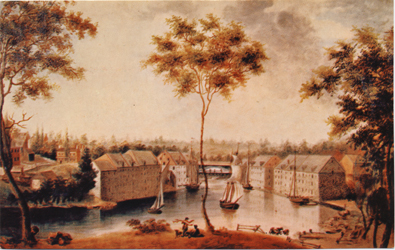
Brandywine flour mills about 1840, painted by Bass Otis. The north bank (to the right) is Brandywine Village.

Prominent Quaker millers, including the Canbys, Leas, and Tatnalls, built their stone homes along Market Street, and built the Brandywine Academy building in 1798. A cupola was added to the academy in 1820, and it rang as the Marquis de Lafayette visited on October 6, 1824. By 1806 there were "about fifty or sixty snug brick, stone, and frame houses" in the village and about 12 mills.

In 1760 a bridge was built at the current site of the Market Street Bridge, and the north race and two more flour mills were built by Joseph Tatnall.

Oliver Evans in the 1780s helped local mills increase their efficiency, ushering in the Industrial Revolution. His first design for a fully integrated automatic flour mill was first used for a mill on nearby Red Clay Creek in 1783 and gradually gained acceptance from Brandywine millers. The grain was unloaded on the ground floor and raised to the top floor by waterpower. Gravity moved the grain through the stages of cleaning, drying, grinding, spreading, and cooling, in a continuous manufacturing process.

The first paper mill in Delaware was opened by Joshua Gilpin, Thomas Gilpin Jr. and Miers Fisher in 1787 in Brandywine Village. This site was later used by one of the largest textile mills in the world, Bancroft Mills, which is now closed.

In 1795 Jacob Broom built the first cotton mill on the Brandywine, a few miles north of the village. The mill burned down in 1797, and in 1802 Broom sold the site, complete with a working dam and millrace, to Eleuthère Irénée du Pont, who paid $6,740 for the 95 acres (380,000 m^{2}). Gunpowder mills, known as the Eleutherian Mills, operated on the site from 1802, and by 1810 the site was the largest gunpowder producer in the country. During the Civil War alone, over 4 million barrels of gunpowder were produced here. The mills, which operated until 1921, are now part of the Hagley Museum and Library.

In 1796 the village contained 12 mills that could grind 400,000 bushels of grain per year. By 1815 several toll roads connected the village with Pennsylvania's grain-growing regions, including the Lancaster, Kennett and Concord Pikes. These roads later became Delaware Route 41, Delaware Route 52, and parts of US 202 combined with Delaware Route 202.

The millers cooperated in maintaining quality and branding the flour. "Brandywine Superfine" flour was shipped all along the Atlantic coast and to the West Indies before the American Revolution.

The village was annexed by the City of Wilmington in 1869. It is now a historic district in the city.

A mill race once used to provide water power is still in working condition in Brandywine Park near downtown Wilmington. This park was designed in the 1890s by Frederick Law Olmsted.
