= Frank Barry =

Frank Barry may refer to:

- Frank Barry (footballer) (1892–1963), Australian rules footballer
- Russell Barry (Frank Barry, 1890–1976), Anglican bishop and author

== See also ==
- Frank Barrie (1936–2025), British actor
- Francis Barry (disambiguation)
