= PennPraxis =

University of Pennsylvania group

PennPraxis is the clinical arm of the School of Design at the University of Pennsylvania, and is a 501c(3) non-profit subsidiary of the Trustees of the University of Pennsylvania. Founded in 2001, PennPraxis has worked on ideas for urban planning for the city of Philadelphia, Pennsylvania, according to a "civic vision" it has for the city, including the Delaware River waterfront, and the western banks of the Schuylkill River.

The group offers community collaborative design opportunities for Penn faculty and students to test ideas and theories in real-world applications. The group also offers architectural and planning services to individuals and groups who are in need or are otherwise unable to procure these services from traditional sources. The group accepts project proposals that do not meet the university's guidelines for "sponsored research projects"; they must also provide educational benefits, or serve the interests of the Philadelphia community.

In its first ten years, it earned $16 million in fees. Some of the group's funding comes from the William Penn Foundation.

== History ==
PennPraxis was founded in 2001 by former School of Design Dean Gary Hack, using $80,000 in seed money from the office of the provost. The group's first executive director was Penn faculty member Harris Steinberg.

On June 26, 2008, Philadelphia mayor Michael Nutter accepted PennPraxis' recommendations for the introduction of Foxwoods and SugarHouse casinos in the redevelopment of the Delaware River waterfront. The plan, while not binding on the two casino operators yet, strongly recommended serious redesign of the casinos' plans, including the use of off-site parking accessible to non-patrons. Representatives from both casinos accused PennPraxis of being biased against them. It was later reported that PennPraxis hired five experts to devise alternative plans for the casinos, accommodating for reduced on-site parking, a breakdown from a more singular building mass to allow more public access to the river, a 30-percent allotment of the area for open space, use of green roofs and accommodations for mass transit, to conform to PennPraxis' civic vision, parts of which the mayor has since promised to accept.

Designs by PennPraxis influenced plans for the regeneration of Philadelphia's waterfront announced in 2012.

In 2014, PennDesign professor Randall Mason succeeded Steinberg as executive director.

In 2016, PennPraxis helped plan and organize the restoration and move of the 1839 Newkirk Monument from Amtrak's Northeast Corridor to a new site along the Schuylkill River Trail.

The group's “impact has been really profound,” Inga Saffron, architecture critic for The Philadelphia Inquirer, told The Pennsylvania Gazette in 2012.
