= Bank of Wilmington and Brandywine =

The Bank of Wilmington and Brandywine (after 1855, the National Bank of Wilmington and Brandywine) was a bank based in Wilmington, Delaware, that operated from 1810 to 1912, when it was absorbed into the Wilmington Trust.

It was organized in April 1810 as the Bank of Wilmington and Brandywine, and operated under that name until May 1855, when it was renamed the National Bank of Wilmington and Brandywine.

Among its directors were Mahlon Betts, James Canby, and John Wales. Its last president as an independent bank was George S. Capelle.

On July 15, 1912, it was merged, along with First National Bank, into the Wilmington Trust, a merger that produced the largest bank on the East Coast.
