= Matthew Newkirk =

American businessman, banker and philanthropist (1794–1868)

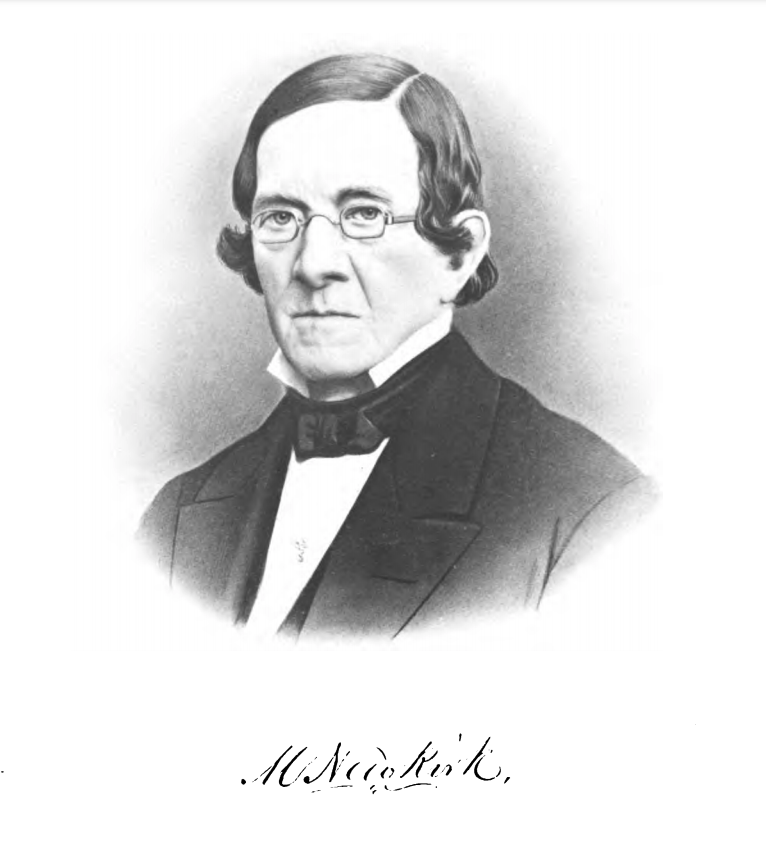
- Portrait from "A Memorial of Matthew Newkirk"
- Born: May 31, 1794; Pittsgrove Township, New Jersey, U.S.
- Died: May 31, 1868; Philadelphia, Pennsylvania, U.S.
- Resting place: Laurel Hill Cemetery, Philadelphia, Pennsylvania, U.S.
- Occupations: merchant, banker, railroad executive
- Known for: Namesake of the Newkirk Viaduct Monument
- Spouse: Jane Reese Stroud (m. 1817; died 1819)

Matthew Newkirk (May 31, 1794 – May 31, 1868) was an American businessman, railroad magnate, banker and philanthropist. He was president of the Philadelphia, Wilmington and Baltimore Railroad (PW&B) and led the integration of four railroad companies to establish the first direct rail service between Philadelphia and Baltimore. He was a director of the Second Bank of the United States; and an investor in the Little Schuylkill Navigation, Railroad and Coal Company and the Cambria Iron Company.

He was a board member of Girard College and served as a trustee to Princeton University for 34 years. He contributed to Lafayette College, served as president of the Woman's Medical College of Pennsylvania, and was one of the founders of the Polytechnic College of Pennsylvania. He donated land to help establish Fairmount Park. The Newkirk Viaduct Monument in Philadelphia is named in his honor.

== Early life and military service ==
Newkirk was born May 31, 1794, the eighth of nine children, in Pittsgrove, New Jersey, to Cornelius and Abigail (Hanna) Newkirk. At 16, he moved to Philadelphia to live with and work for Joseph and Collin Cooper, dry goods merchants on Front Street. He worked with them until he was 21 years old and learned the business.

He volunteered for military service in the War of 1812; he served in the Second Company, Washington Guards of the First Regiment of Pennsylvania volunteers and left the service as a corporal.

In 1817, he married Jane Reese Stroud, who would die 21 months later of tuberculosis.

== Career ==
He and a sister, Mary, opened a dry goods store on North Second Street in Philadelphia. The business and subsequent ones thrived, and he expanded his reach as far as New Orleans.

From 1821, he formed a partnership with William Heberton. The firm Newkirk and Heberton conducted wholesale and retail trade at 95 Market Street until 1824. The following year, he formed a mercantile partnership with Charles S. Olden, who would later become governor of New Jersey.

In 1832, he bought the resort hotel at Brandywine Springs, six miles west of Wilmington, Delaware, where he owned a vacation cottage; he spent sums to improve the building and its grounds.

In 1839, he retired from his mercantile business. His friend Nicholas Biddle convinced him to become a director of the second United States Bank, where he managed the deposits of Daniel Webster and others.

He was elected to the Select Council, the predecessor body to the Philadelphia City Council that chose the city's mayors until 1839 and appointed city officers until 1885.

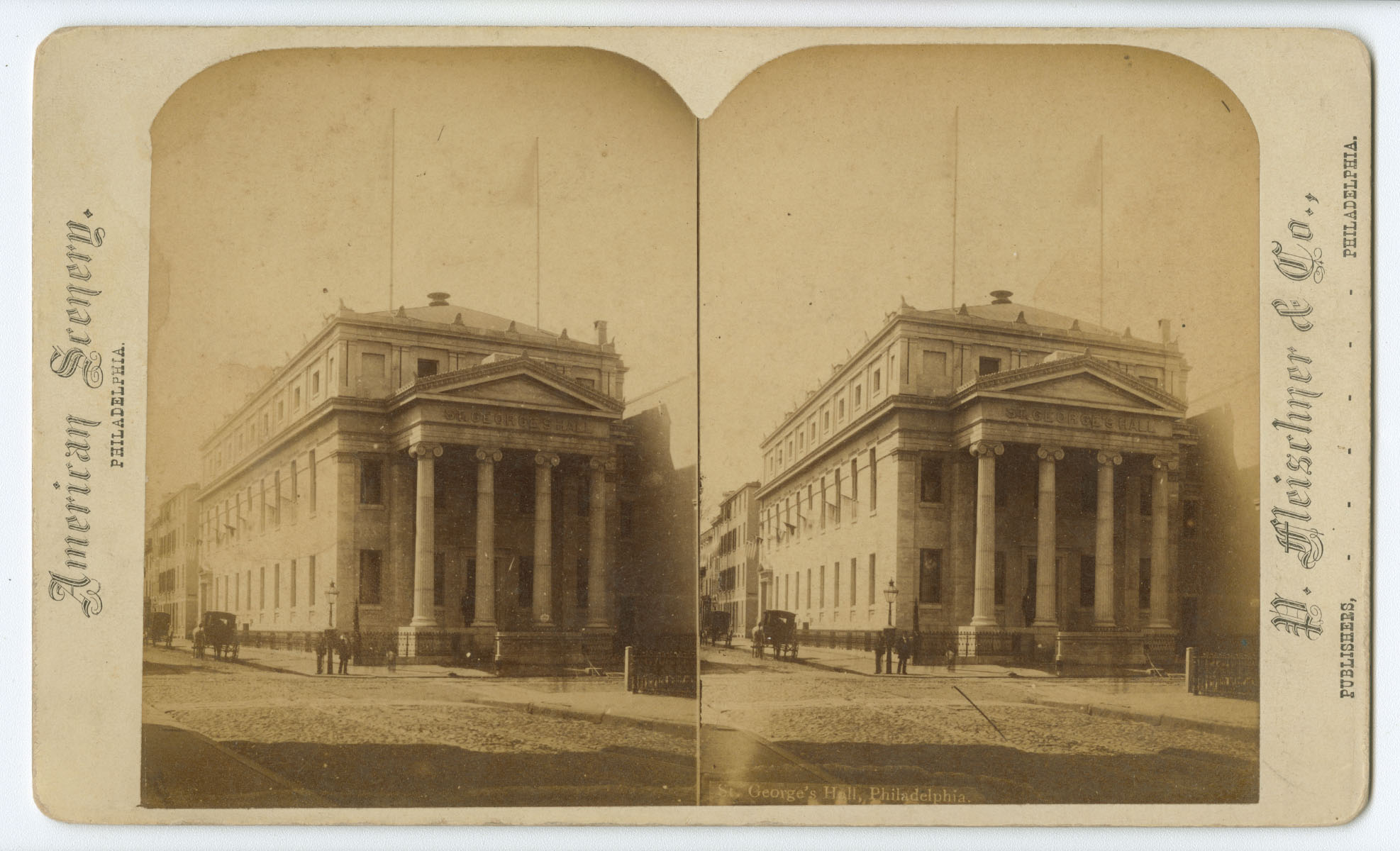
Newkirk's Philadelphia mansion; later, St. George's Hall

In 1835, Newkirk bought a vacant lot at 13th and Arch Streets in downtown Philadelphia and built a mansion. Designed by Thomas Ustick Walter, it was built of marble and featured a fresco by Italian artist Nicola Monachesi.

That same year, Newkirk bought 3,000 shares in the Wilmington and Susquehanna Railroad and 3,587 shares in the Baltimore and Port Deposit Railroad. He would spend much of the 1830s on further efforts to raise money for and build a rail line from Philadelphia south to the cities of Wilmington, Delaware, and Baltimore. Four railroads were ultimately chartered by the various states; Newkirk funded and directed the building of the W&S and the B&PD, then orchestrated its merger with the other two. In 1838, the merged PW&B began direct rail service between the cities, broken only by a ferry across the Susquehanna River. Much of its right-of-way is still in use today by Amtrak's Northeast Corridor.

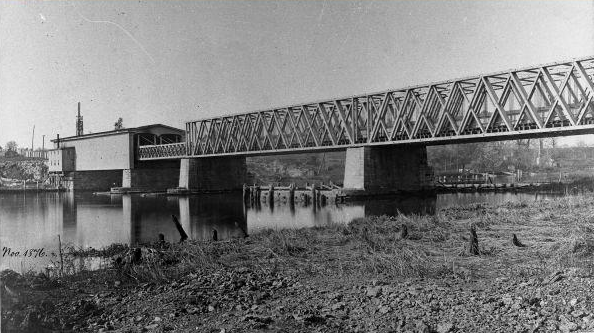
1876 photo of the Newkirk Viaduct across the Schuylkill River

Among the railroad's achievements was the first permanent bridge across the Schuylkill River south of Market Street, which the PW&B's directors named for Newkirk. They also presented their president with a silver service that included a large soup tureen, two tall pitchers, and an engraved tray; the tray alone was worth $1,000 ($30,234 today). In 1896, the service was sold by a Philadelphia pawn shop to a New York City dealer.

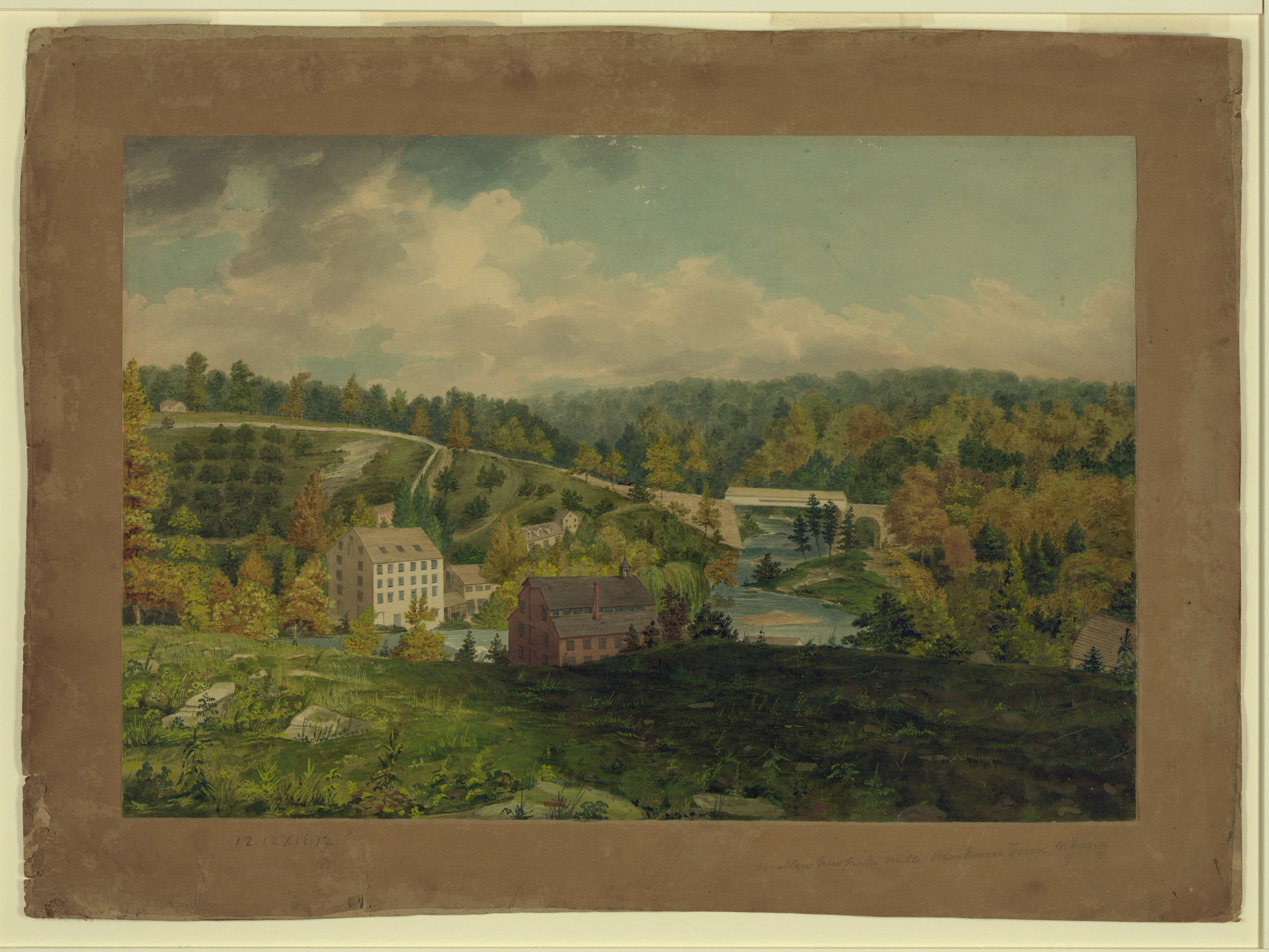
1828 painting of Newkirk's Brandywine River mills in Delaware

Newkirk also had financial interest in Pennsylvania coal mining and was involved in the Little Schuylkill Navigation, Railroad and Coal Company. In 1854, Newkirk invested in Cambria Iron Company in Johnstown, Pennsylvania. He was also invested in real estate. He owned property in 11 states and at one time was the largest landlord in the city of Philadelphia.

He was close friends with Henry Clay and would host and entertain Clay on his frequent trips to Philadelphia. A deeply religious man, Newkirk served for 34 years as an elder of Philadelphia's Central Presbyterian Church.

== Philanthropy ==
Newkirk was a founder, officer, or patron of several colleges and universities. In 1843, he was listed as the donor of the single largest monetary gift to the University of Delaware: $100 ($3,400 today). The university library still purchases books through the Matthew Newkirk Memorial Fund.

He served as president of the Woman's Medical College of Pennsylvania, contributed money to Lafayette College, was a board member of Girard College, and served as a trustee of Princeton University for 34 years—the university's oldest trustee when he died. In 1853, he helped establish the Polytechnic College of Pennsylvania, the nation's eighth engineering school.

He contributed land and was a supporter of the development of Fairmount Park.

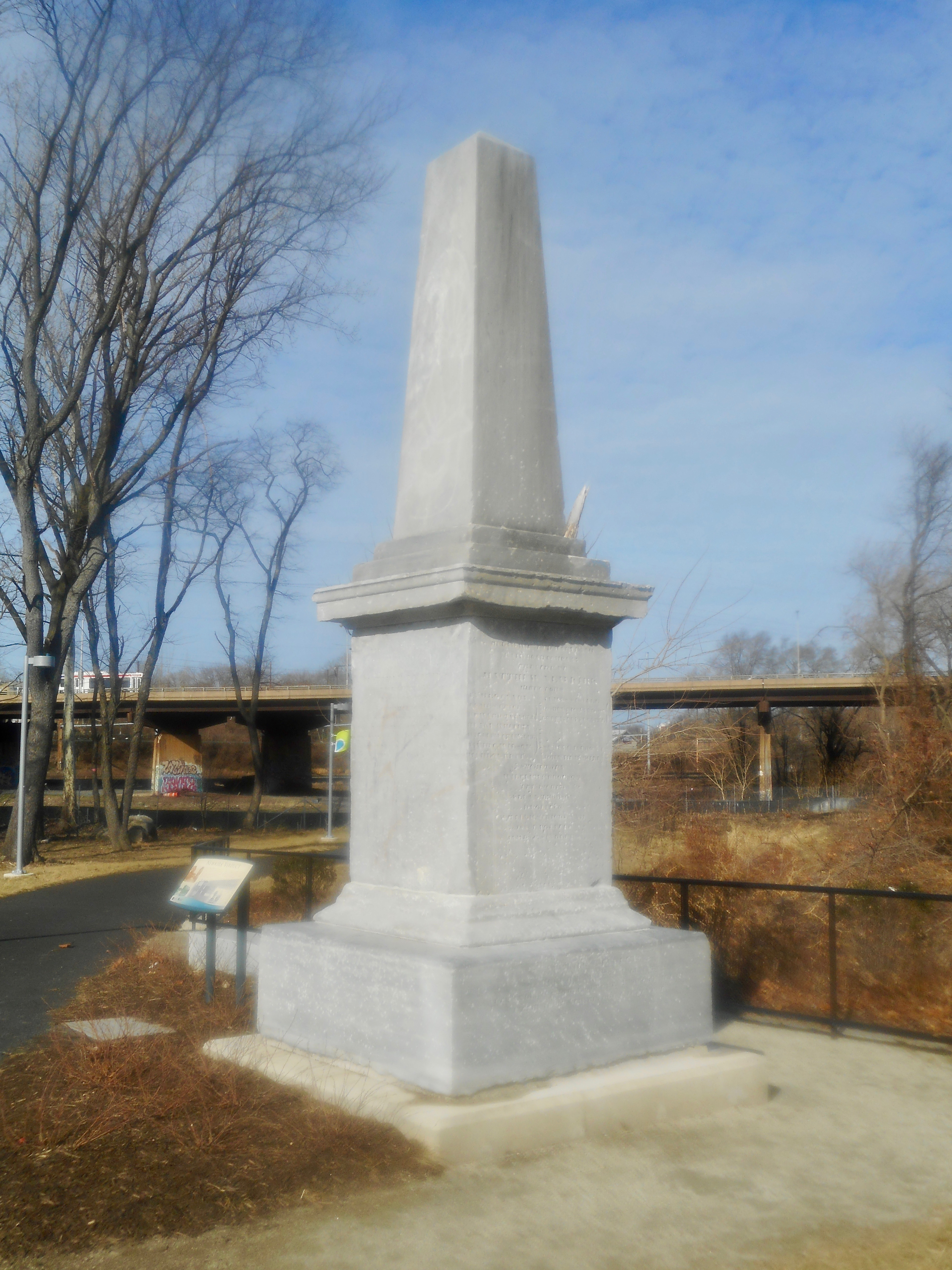
The Newkirk Viaduct Monument in 2018

He served as president of the Pennsylvania Temperance Society.

== Death and legacy ==
On August 14, 1838, the PW&B board of directors named the bridge over the Schuykill River in Newkirk's honor and commissioned the Newkirk Viaduct Monument at its west end.

Newkirk died on May 31, 1868 in his Philadelphia mansion and was interred at Laurel Hill Cemetery. He was survived by one child, Matthew Newkirk, a Presbyterian minister. In his will, Newkirk bequeathed more than $1 million ($24,200,000 today) to his family, and $500 to the Central Presbyterian Church of Philadelphia to buy books.

Eight years later, his family sold Newkirk's mansion to the Society of the Sons of St. George, which renamed it "St. George's Hall" and used it as their headquarters. It was demolished in 1903. The front colonnade survived and is displayed at the Princeton Battlefield State Park in New Jersey.
