= Holly Hall (Elkton, Maryland) =

Historic house in Maryland, United States

- U.S. National Register of Historic Places
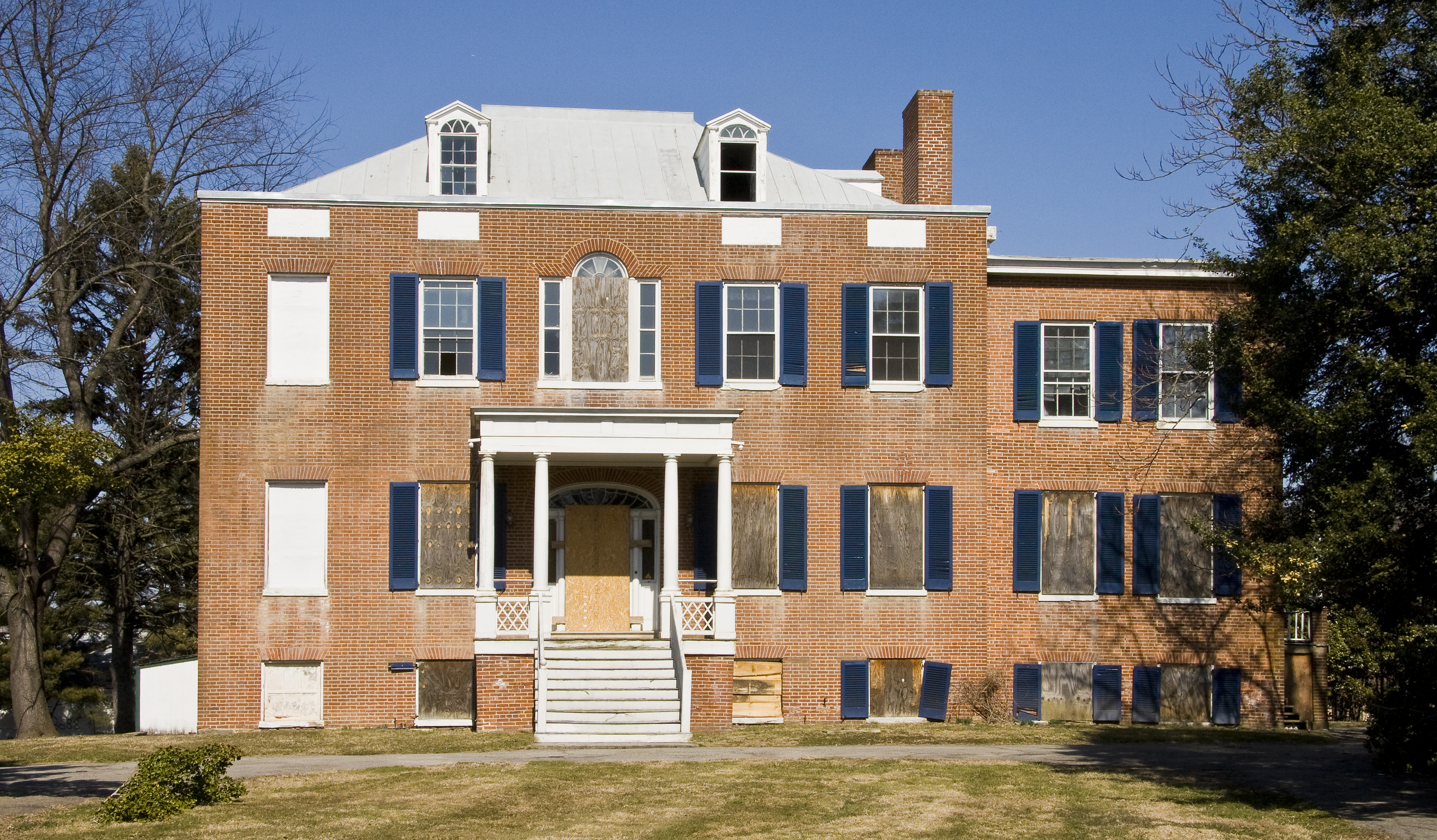

- Location within Maryland Location within the United States
- Location: 259 S. Bridge St., Elkton, Maryland
- Coordinates: 39°36′8″N 75°49′41″W
- Area: 6.2 acres (2.5 ha)
- Built: 1810
- Built by: Sewell, James
- Architectural style: Federal
- NRHP reference No.: 76000986
- Added to NRHP: October 8, 1976

Holly Hall is a historic home located at Elkton, Cecil County, Maryland, United States. Built by James Sewall ca. 1810–20, it is a 2 1/2-story, Federal-style brick mansion built about 1810. The one-story brick north wing was added as a chapel in the 20th century. Also on the property is a late-19th-century two-story wood tenant house and two concrete block buildings. A few holly trees remain of the many which gave this house its name. Its parapets are unique in Maryland.

== Holly Hall Oak ==
The Holly Hall Oak was a noted white oak on the grounds of Holly Hall, that was reputed to be more than 400 years old. It collapsed of old age and sheer size on 26 April 2009. The tree was threatened by the construction of a shopping center in the 1970s, but was saved by popular outcry. It had a circumference of 21.92 feet (6.68 m), height of 58 feet (18 m) and a spread of 78 feet (24 m) when it was last measured in 2008.

Holly Hall was listed on the National Register of Historic Places in 1976.
