= Allan Thomson (businessman) =

Allan Thomson (1788–1884) was a banker, railroad executive, and city councilman of Wilmington, Delaware.

In 1838, Thomson served as treasurer for three of the four railroads that built the first rail link from Philadelphia south: the Wilmington and Susquehanna Railroad, the Delaware and Maryland Railroad, and the Philadelphia, Wilmington and Baltimore Railroad, for which service he is named on the 1839 Newkirk Viaduct Monument.
