= Alexander Provest =

American stonemason and businessman

Alexander Provest was a 19th-century stonemason and businessman who helped build the United States Capitol.

Provest descended from French Huguenots who fled from the Province of Normandy to Holland to escape the 1572 Massacre of St. Bartholomew. In 1750, his grandfather John Provest emigrated to the colony of Delaware, where he had three sons, including Alexander (d. 1840), the father of this article's subject. Sometime before 1809, the elder Alexander moved to Germantown outside Philadelphia and became a stonemason "particularly remembered for having built some of the most important bridges in and around Germantown notably the Township Line bridge over Paper Mill Run and the abutments of the Reading Railroad bridge at Wayne Junction. He also built the bridge over the Wingohocking Creek at Church Lane." At least two of his sons became stonemasons: Charles and Alexander, the subject of this article.

Alexander and Charles Provest did the stonework for the 1838 Newkirk Viaduct, the Schuylkill River bridge that carried the first railroad from Philadelphia to points south. The brothers' service is noted on the 1839 Newkirk Viaduct Monument.

Later, Alexander Provest moved to Washington, D.C., where he and William H. Winter formed a company, Provest, Winter, and Co. In 1849, the company bid successfully to do the marble work for the east wing of the U.S. Patent Office, the 1836 building that today contains the National Portrait Gallery and the Smithsonian American Art Museum. They subsequently won the contract for the west wing. By 1854, the job employed "fifty stone cutters and as many laborers" at a monthly payroll estimated at $23,000 to $25,000($875,000 today). The work was completed the following year.

Those contracts and others made Provest rich. In 1856, the New York Daily Herald reported that he was one of a small group of Washington, D.C., residents with a net worth of $500,000 to $1 million ($35,000,000 today).

From the mid-1850s to 1861, Provest was part of the contracting team under Thomas Ustick Walter that built the U.S. Capitol dome. A New York Times article describes "a local Washington entrepreneur, Alexander Provest, whose army of craftsmen was sawing, carving, polishing and setting the stone when it arrived." An 1855 article said the marble work employed 130 stonecutters and artists and 120 laborers, many of whom worked in a 600-by-40-foot structure that was "probably at this time the largest marble cutting shop in the world".

== Family ==
Besides Charles, Alexander's siblings included Paul, Jacob, Isabelle, and John. After the first three siblings married, they moved into a row of Germantown buildings owned by their father: 5239, 5241, 5243, and 5245 Bringhurst Street. (Isabelle married a Namaan Keyser.) In the 1850s, John operated a private school in a fifth building in the row, No. 5247. In 1853, according to one source, John helped found the Star Club, the country's first cricket club.

Alexander himself married Matilda Vermillion, also of Germantown, on December 23, 1828.
