= John Wales =

American politician

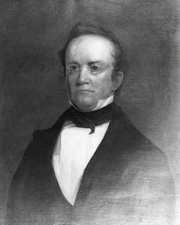

United States Senator from Delaware
- In office February 23, 1849 – March 3, 1851
- Preceded by: John M. Clayton
- Succeeded by: James A. Bayard Jr.

Personal details
- Born: July 31, 1783 New Haven, Connecticut, US
- Died: December 3, 1863 (aged 80) Wilmington, Delaware, US
- Party: Whig
- Education: Yale College
- Profession: Lawyer

John Wales (July 31, 1783 – December 3, 1863) was an American lawyer and politician from Wilmington, in New Castle County, Delaware. He was a member of the Whig Party who served as U.S. Senator from Delaware.

== Early life and family ==
Wales was born in New Haven, Connecticut, and graduated from Yale College in 1801. He was admitted to the Connecticut Bar in 1801 and began practicing law in New Haven, and later, Philadelphia, Pennsylvania. After two years in Baltimore, Maryland, he moved to Wilmington, Delaware, in 1815.

== Professional career ==
In 1814, Wales became a secretary for the Society for the Promotion of American Manufacturers, which was designed to promote and encourage Delaware's manufacturing industry. Wales drafted the by-laws of the Savings Bank in 1832, then served as the president of the Bank of Wilmington and Brandywine from 1824 to 1829.

== Political career ==
Wales served as the Secretary of State for Delaware from 1845 to 1849, and was elected as a Whig to the U.S. Senate to fill the vacancy left when John M. Clayton resigned. Taking office on February 23, 1849, he served until March 3, 1851, having failed in his reelection bid.

An abolitionist, Wales served as a Delaware representative to the First National Convention of the Abolition of Slavery along with famous abolitionist Thomas Garrett. When Garrett was tried in 1848 for aiding the escape of a slave family, Wales served as his lawyer. He was also one of the founders of Newark College in Newark, Delaware, now the University of Delaware.

== Death and legacy ==
Wales died in Wilmington and is buried in the Wilmington and Brandywine Cemetery.

== Almanac ==
The General Assembly chose the U.S. Senators, who took office March 4, for a six-year term. In this case he was completing the existing term, the vacancy caused by the resignation of John M. Clayton.

Public offices
Office	Type	Location	Began office	Ended office	Notes
U.S. Senator	Legislature	Washington	February 23, 1849	March 3, 1851	

United States congressional service
Dates	Congress	Chamber	Majority	President	Committees	Class/District
1847–1849	30th	U.S. Senate	Democratic	James K. Polk		class 1
1849–1851	31st	U.S. Senate	Whig	Zachary Taylor		class 1

== Places with more information ==
- Delaware Historical Society; website; 505 North Market Street, Wilmington, Delaware 19801; (302) 655-7161.
- University of Delaware; Library website; 181 South College Avenue, Newark, Delaware 19717; (302) 831-2965.

U.S. Senate
Preceded by John M. Clayton	U.S. senator from Delaware; 1849–1851	Succeeded by James A. Bayard Jr.
