= Mahlon Betts =

American legislator from Delaware

- Born: 16 March 1795; Attleboro, Bucks County, Pennsylvania, U.S.
- Died: 4 March 1867 (aged 71); Wilmington, Delaware, U.S.
- Occupations: Carpenter, shipwright, railroad car builder, businessman, banker, legislator
- Years active: 1812–1867
- Known for: Co-founding Harlan and Hollingsworth Company, Pusey and Jones Company, Betts Machine Company
- Spouse: Mary R. Seal (m. 1818)
- Children: Edward Betts

Mahlon Betts (March 16, 1795 – March 4, 1867) was an American carpenter, railroad car builder, shipwright, businessman, banker, and legislator who helped found three of Wilmington, Delaware's major manufacturing enterprises: the Harlan and Hollingsworth Company, the Pusey and Jones Company, and the Betts Machine Company.

== Biography ==
Born in Attleboro in Bucks County, Pennsylvania, on March 16, 1795, Betts came to Wilmington in 1812. On November 8, 1818, he married Mary R. Seal at the Wilmington Friends Meeting. In 1828 (or 1829), he built a foundry at 8th and Orange Streets, which would operate as Betts & Seal until 1867. There he installed the state's first stationary steam engine. His company also manufactured a variety of wheels as well as pinions, shafts, pulleys, cogs, and other castings.

On March 1, 1836, Betts joined Samuel N. Pusey, who was a machinist in Wilmington, to launch Betts & Pusey. The company built railroad cars at a plant at Water and West Streets. He eventually leased the foundry to his son Edward (1825–1917), who carried on the business.

In 1837, Mahlon became a director of the Wilmington and Susquehanna Railroad. The railroad soon merged into the Philadelphia, Wilmington and Baltimore Railroad, which thenceforth operated the first rail link from Philadelphia to Baltimore. (This main line survives today as part of Amtrak's Northeast Corridor.) Betts became a director in the merged railroad, and his service as a railroad executive is noted on the 1839 Newkirk Viaduct Monument in Philadelphia.

He was also a director of the National Bank of Wilmington and Brandywine, the president of the Mechanics Bank, and the president of First National Bank of Wilmington.

In the 1840s, he served in the Delaware General Assembly, first as a representative and then as a senator.

Mahlon Betts died in Wilmington on March 4, 1867. The ship named after him, the Mahlon Betts, is claimed to be the first iron sailing yacht built in the United States.
