= Wilmington Trust =

American fiduciary institution

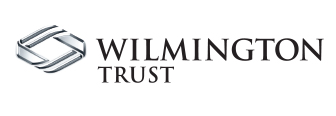

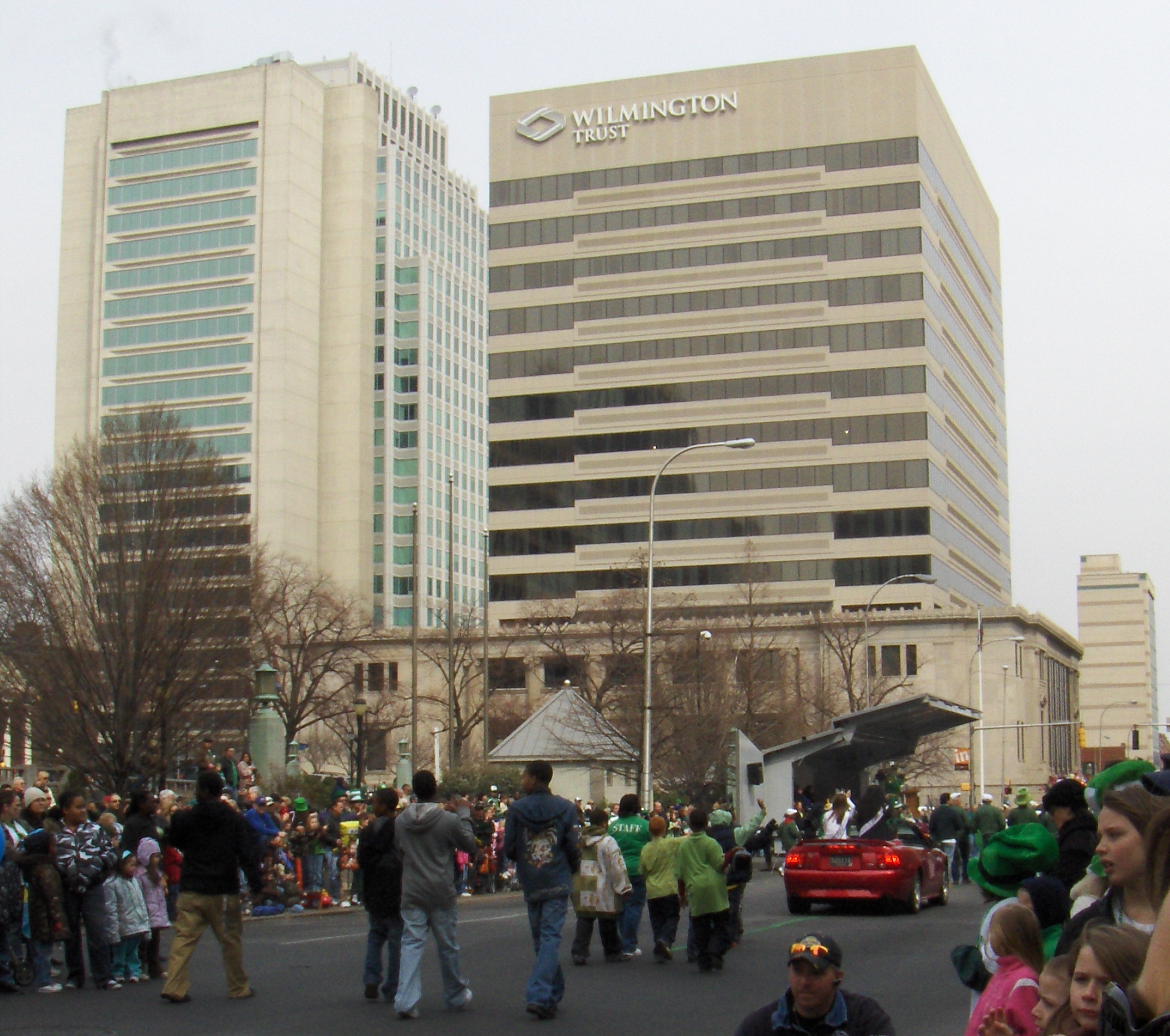
- Headquarters in Wilmington, Delaware
- Type: Subsidiary
- Industry: Financial
- Founded: 1903; 123 years ago
- Founder: T. Coleman du Pont
- Headquarters: Wilmington, Delaware, U.S.
- Products: Global Corporate and Institutional Services, Private Banking, Investment Management, Fiduciary Services, Family Office
- AUM: US$176 billion (March 31, 2023)
- Number of employees: 2,672
- Parent: M&T Bank
- Website: wilmingtontrust.com

Wilmington Trust is one of the top 10 largest American institutions by fiduciary assets. Wilmington Trust is currently a provider of international corporate and institutional services, investment management, and private banking. The firm was founded on July 8, 1903, as a banking, trust, and safe deposit company by DuPont president T. Coleman du Pont. In 2010, it became a subsidiary of M&T Bank.

== History ==
Wilmington Trust was founded on July 8, 1903, by T. Coleman du Pont, then the president of DuPont, to manage the growing fortune of the duPont family. DuPont opened the business in the dining room and parlor of a former private residence at 915 Market Street in Wilmington, Delaware, with a handful of investors and $500,000 in market capitalization.

In 1907, the company moved to the DuPont Building at Tenth & Market Streets. It paid its first dividend (2.5%, $1.25 per share) on August 1, 1908. The company’s first merger occurred on July 15, 1912: the acquisitions of the First National Bank and the National Bank of Wilmington and Brandywine made it the largest bank on the East Coast. In 1971, it became one of the founding members of NASDAQ. In 1999, it moved its listing to the New York Stock Exchange (NYSE).

On November 1, 2010, Wilmington Trust announced a merger with M&T Bank, of Buffalo, New York. The deal valued the 107-year-old company at $3.84 a share, or 46 percent less than its closing price on Oct. 29. Investors received 0.051 shares of Buffalo-based M&T for each Wilmington share.

In 2011, it announced its intention to "voluntarily de-list" from the NYSE upon completion of its merger with M&T Bank.

Wilmington Trust is one of the largest holders of fiduciary assets in the United States.

On May 3, 2018, top executives of Wilmington Trust were found guilty by the United States Department of Justice for falsifying bank records. The four executives received "three- to six-year prison terms". However, the executives’ convictions were later vacated by the Third Circuit Court of Appeals. The three-judge panel acquitted the defendants of the majority of the charges against them, and it ordered a new trial for the remaining charges. The Department of Justice declined to retry the case.

== Offices ==
The Wilmington Trust Headquarters is in the converted post office on Rodney Square in downtown Wilmington. It has domestic offices in New York City, Los Angeles, Boston, Philadelphia, Minneapolis, Las Vegas, Phoenix, Atlanta, Baltimore, Beverly Hills, Stamford, Connecticut; Palm Beach, Florida; West Chester, Pennsylvania; Bethlehem, Pennsylvania; Villanova, Pennsylvania; Jacksonville, Florida; Birmingham, Alabama, and Charleston, South Carolina.

Internationally, Wilmington Trust has offices in Dublin, Frankfurt, Paris, and London.

Its branch in Newark, Delaware was added to the National Register of Historic Places in 1982.

== See also ==
- List of bank mergers in the United States
