= Joseph Tatnall =

American businessman

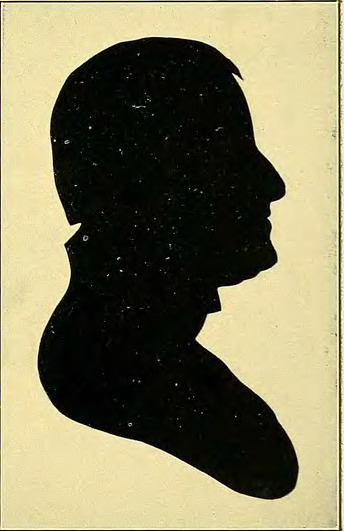
- Born: September 6, 1740; Wilmington, Delaware, United States
- Died: August 3, 1813 (aged 72); Brandywine Village
- Occupation: Businessman
- Spouse(s): Elizabeth Tatnall
- Children: 9, including Edward Tatnall

Joseph Tatnall (1740–1813) was an American businessman, who was a prominent Quaker merchant, miller, and banker in Wilmington, Delaware.

== Early life ==
The only son of Edward and Elizabeth (Pennock) Tatnall, Joseph was born in Wilmington on November 6, 1740. He established a mill on the Brandywine River outside Wilmington, where he helped develop the Brandywine Village, a center of early American industrialization.

During the American Revolution, Tatnall hosted Generals George Washington and Lafayette at his stone mansion at 1803 Market Street, and lent his parlors to General Anthony Wayne to use as a headquarters. He also kept his flour mills "going day and night" to provide food for the Continental Army.

== Career ==
In 1795, Tatnall became the first president of the National Bank of Delaware, which would survive as an independent bank until 1929.

With James Canby (1781–1858), a scion of another prosperous miller, Tatnall rented farm land for grazing and growing hay.

In 1802, Tatnall was named president of the Chesapeake and Delaware Canal Company, which sought to build a canal linking the Delaware River near Philadelphia, Pennsylvania, and the Chesapeake Bay to help bring Maryland grain to Brandywine mills. The company eventually ceased operations, but a successor effort completed the 13.6-mile canal in 1829.

Among Tatnall's partners in shipping ventures was Joseph Shallcross, a miller, West Indies trader, and, from 1790 to 1792, mayor of Wilmington. Their joint ventures included the 1775 brig Nancy and the 1801 voyage of the sloop Sally.

== Personal life ==
On January 31, 1765, Tatnall married Elizabeth Lea (1743–1805), daughter of James and Margaret (Marshall) Lea, in Wilmington. Among their nine children was Sarah Tatnall, who married prominent Wilmington miller Thomas Lea (1757–1823), and whose grandson Preston Lea would be Governor of Delaware from 1905 to 1908. Tatnall and Thomas Lea operated several mills together.

Another child of Joseph and Elizabeth was Edward Tatnall (1782–1856), one of the organizers of the Delaware and Maryland Rail Road Company, whose own grandson, Henry Tatnall (1897–1940), would become the Pennsylvania Railroad's first professionally trained vice president in charge of finance (1904–25).

At his death in 1813, Tatnall owned stocks in a wide variety of ventures, including the canal company, Wilmington Insurance Company, The Philadelphia Bank, and "various transportation companies"; and county and government bonds.
