= 60th Street Branch =

Railroad branch line

The 60th Street Branch was a railway line in Pennsylvania. It ran 4.5 miles (7.2 km) from a junction with the Northeast Corridor in Philadelphia, Pennsylvania, to Hog Island, Pennsylvania. It was built in 1918 by the Philadelphia, Baltimore and Washington Railroad, a subsidiary of the Pennsylvania Railroad. It was conveyed to Conrail in 1976 and later abandoned, save for a small section incorporated into SEPTA's Airport Line.

== Route ==
The 60th Street Branch diverged from the Philadelphia, Baltimore and Washington Railroad's main line (now the Northeast Corridor) near Brill Interlocking, and ran in a southerly direction toward Fort Mifflin, crossing the Chester Secondary.

== History ==
The Philadelphia, Baltimore and Washington Railroad began construction of the 60th Street Branch in November 1917 and completed the 4.5-mile (7.2 km) line on August 20, 1918. The Philadelphia, Baltimore and Washington Railroad remained the owner of the line through the Penn Central merger in 1968. With the Penn Central's final bankruptcy in 1976, the 60th Street Branch was conveyed to Conrail. Conrail sold part of the line to Philadelphia in 1978 for the development of the Airport Line.
