= Farmers' Bank of Delaware =

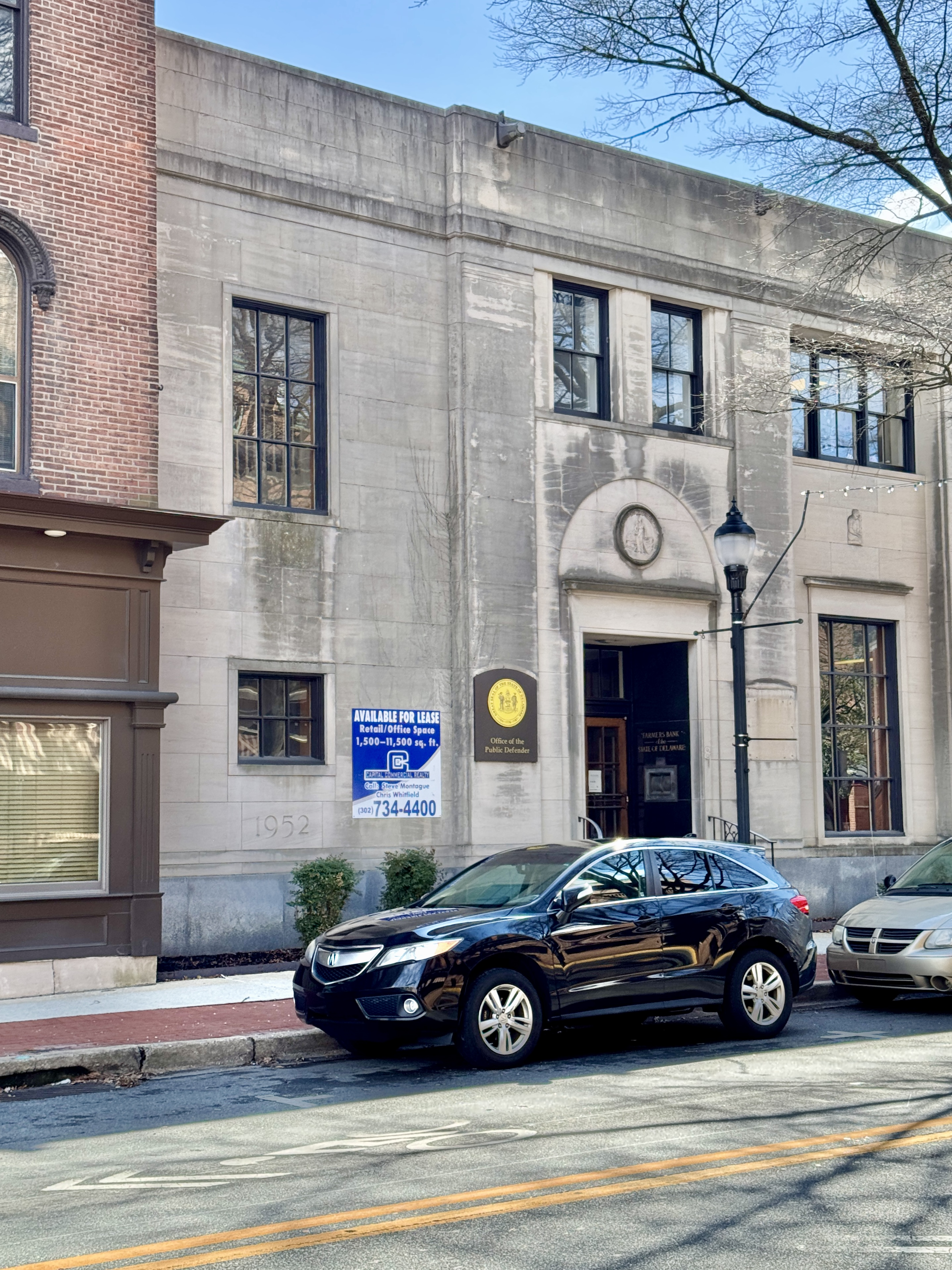
- The Dover headquarters of Farmers' Bank from 1952 until the bank's merger with Girard Bank in 1981.
- Industry: Banking
- Founded: 1807; 218 years ago
- Defunct: 1981; 44 years ago
- Fate: Acquired by Girard Bank
- Headquarters: Dover, Delaware

Farmers' Bank of Delaware was the second bank chartered by Delaware. It operated from 1807 until 1981, when it was on the verge of bank failure and was acquired by Girard Bank. At that time, the bank had 28 branches. For most of its existence, the bank was 49% owned by the state government, although it was privately managed.

== History ==
On February 4, 1807, the Delaware General Assembly passed legislation allowing the Farmers' Bank to incorporate and issue $500,000 of capital, via 10,000 shares at $50 each. The bank was incorporated by Henry M. Ridgely in Dover, with branches in New Castle and Georgetown. The bank was established to provide banking and credit services to farmers in Kent and Sussex Counties, ending the 12 years of monopoly in banking services held by the National Bank of Delaware in the state.

A supplementary charter on January 22, 1813, added a fourth branch in Wilmington.

In 1816, the Second Bank of the United States selected the bank as a local depository for federal revenues.

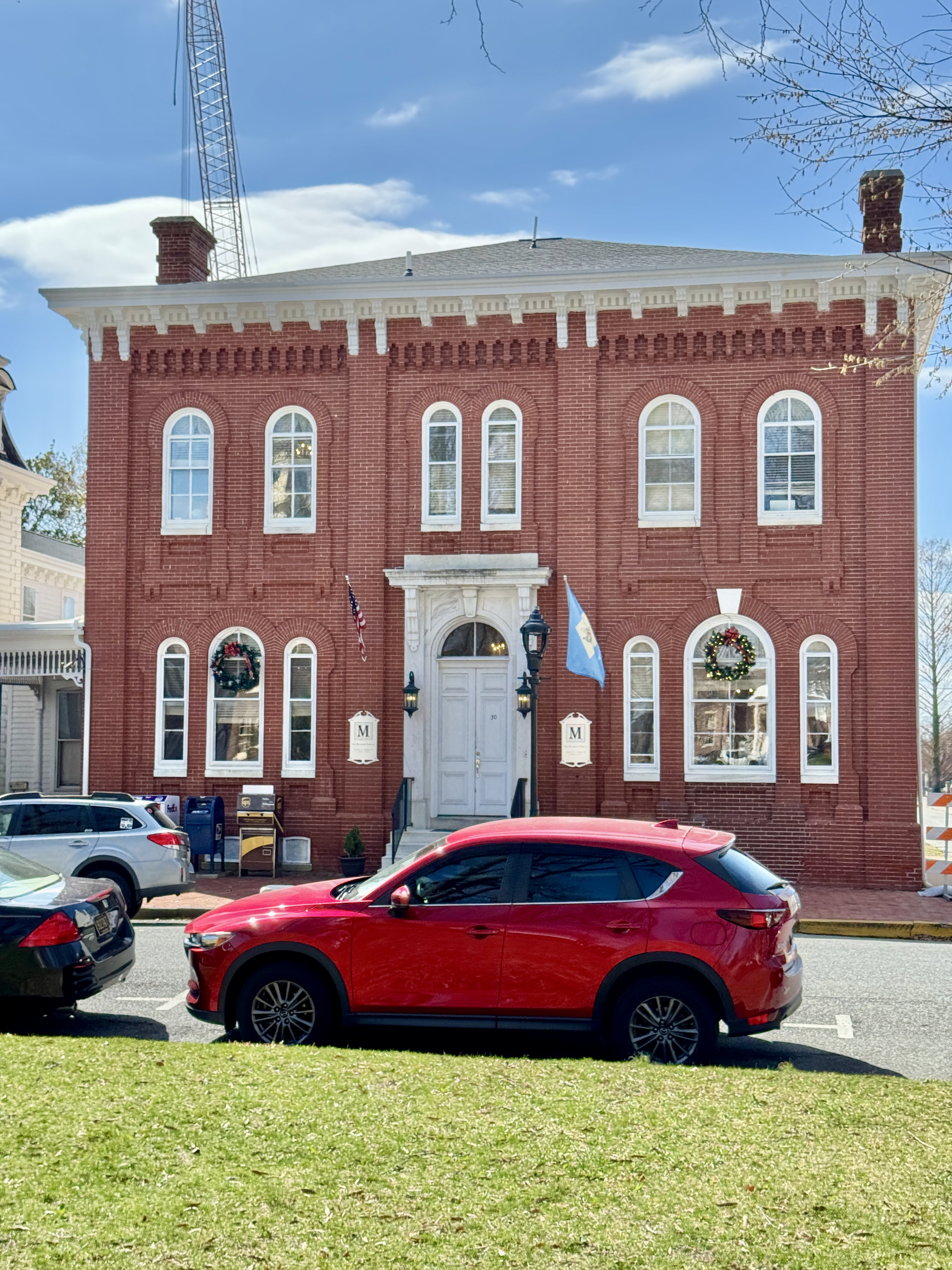
A headquarters building in Dover, built circa 1950.

In 1837, the bank was selected as the depository for the federal surplus.

In 1899, the branch in New Castle was closed after the city went into decline.

In February 1976, the bank held merger talks with Girard Bank.

In 1976, the state of Delaware increased its ownership from 49% to 80% after the bank lost $20.8 million in 1975 and the Federal Deposit Insurance Corporation (FDIC) noted that it would cost more to liquidate the bank than to inject capital. As part of the deal between Governor Sherman W. Tribbitt and the FDIC, the state of Delaware agreed to keep all its deposits in the bank.

On December 20, 1981, when the bank was on the verge bank failure, it was acquired by Girard Bank for $38.6 million, which required the passage of a special statute that allowed the Pennsylvania-based Girard Bank to acquire a Delaware bank. Girard Bank was acquired by Mellon Bank in 1984 and was sold in 2001 to Citizens Financial Group.

=== Management history ===
Among the presidents of the bank were:

- Henry M. Ridgely (1807-)
- Allan Thomson (October 22, 1831, to January 7, 1836)
- James A. Bayard Jr. (January 7, 1836, to January 5, 1843)
- David C. Wilson (January 5, 1843, to March 31, 1865)
- Charles I. du Pont (April 6, 1866, to December 12, 1868)
- Francis Barry (January 7, 1868, to January 8, 1878)
- George Richardson (January 3, 1878, to at least 1888)
