= Edward Tatnall =

Edward Tatnall (1782–1856) was an American miller and railroad executive based in Wilmington, Delaware.

== Early life ==
Tattnell was a son of Joseph Tatnall, a miller and banker in Wilmington.

== Business career ==
He was a director of the Delaware and Maryland Railroad and of the Wilmington and Susquehanna Railroad, two of the four railroads that helped build the first rail link from Philadelphia to Baltimore. In 1838, they merged into the Philadelphia, Wilmington, and Baltimore Railroad. His service is noted on the 1839 Newkirk Viaduct Monument (upon which his name is misspelled as "Tatnell").

== Personal life ==
His grandson, Henry Tatnall (1897–1940), was the Pennsylvania Railroad's first professionally trained vice president in charge of finance (1904–25).
