= James Canby =

James Canby (1781–1858) was an American businessman, banker and early railroad executive based in Wilmington, Delaware.

He was the son of Samuel and Frances Lea Canby. Samuel Canby was originally trained as a carpenter and cabinet maker and became a miller when he opened a flour mill in 1770 in Brandywine village. James Canby expanded upon his father's businesses by opening several additional mills and became a prominent businessman. Among other interests, he served as president of the Bank of Wilmington and Brandywine and invested in real estate in Baltimore, Maryland, and "western lands".

Canby's interest in railroads stemmed from his belief that the newish transportation method could benefit his milling business. In the 1830s, he helped organize and obtain a state charter for the Wilmington and Susquehanna Railroad, of which he served as president until 1837. From 1835, he also served as a director of the Delaware and Maryland Railroad. The W&S and D&M joined two other railroads to create the first rail link from Philadelphia to Baltimore. (The main line survives today as part of Amtrak's Northeast Corridor.)

An amateur botanist, Canby planted a rare cedar of Lebanon tree in 1850 at the entrance to Wilmington's Wilmington and Brandywine Cemetery, of which he was an officer.

== Death and legacy ==
He died in 1858. His service as a railroad executive is noted on the 1839 Newkirk Viaduct Monument in Philadelphia.
