= Philadelphia, Wilmington and Baltimore Railroad =

Railway company, later part of the Pennsylvania Railroad

- The rail lines of the Philadelphia, Wilmington and Baltimore Railroad
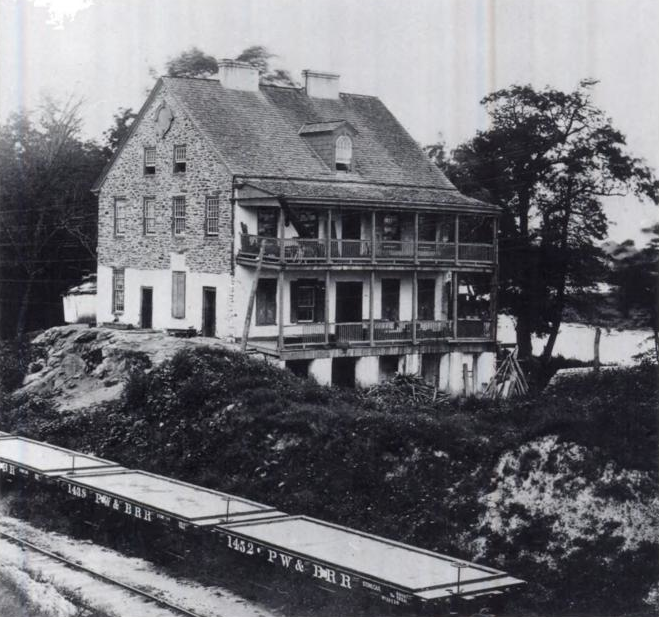
- Philadelphia, Wilmington and Baltimore Railroad flatcars outside Gray's Ferry Tavern in southwest Philadelphia, c. 1870s

Overview
- Headquarters: Philadelphia, Pennsylvania, U.S.
- Locale: Pennsylvania, Delaware, and Maryland
- Dates of operation: 1836–1902 (purchased 1880 by Pennsylvania Railroad)
- Predecessor: Baltimore and Port Deposit Rail Road Company; Delaware and Maryland Rail Road Company; Philadelphia and Delaware County Rail-Road Company; Wilmington and Susquehanna Rail Road Company
- Successor: Philadelphia, Baltimore and Washington Railroad (PB&W) (1902–1976)

Technical
- Track gauge: 4 ft 8 1/2 in (1,435 mm) standard gauge
- Length: 669 mi (1,077 km)

The Philadelphia, Wilmington and Baltimore Railroad (PW&B) was an American railroad, headquartered in Philadelphia, that operated in Pennsylvania, Delaware, and Maryland from 1836 to 1902. It merged with three other state-chartered railroads in 1838 to create a single line between Philadelphia and Baltimore. Through purchases, leases, and other arrangements, it created a wider network of operations, including down the Delmarva Peninsula.

In 1881, the PW&B was purchased by the Pennsylvania Railroad (PRR), which was at the time the nation's largest railroad. In 1902, the PRR merged it into its Philadelphia, Baltimore and Washington Railroad.

The right-of-way laid down by the PW&B line is still in use today as part of Amtrak's Northeast Corridor and the Maryland Department of Transportation's MARC commuter passenger system from Baltimore to Maryland's northeast corner. Freight is hauled on the route, formerly by the Conrail system and currently by Norfolk Southern.

== History ==
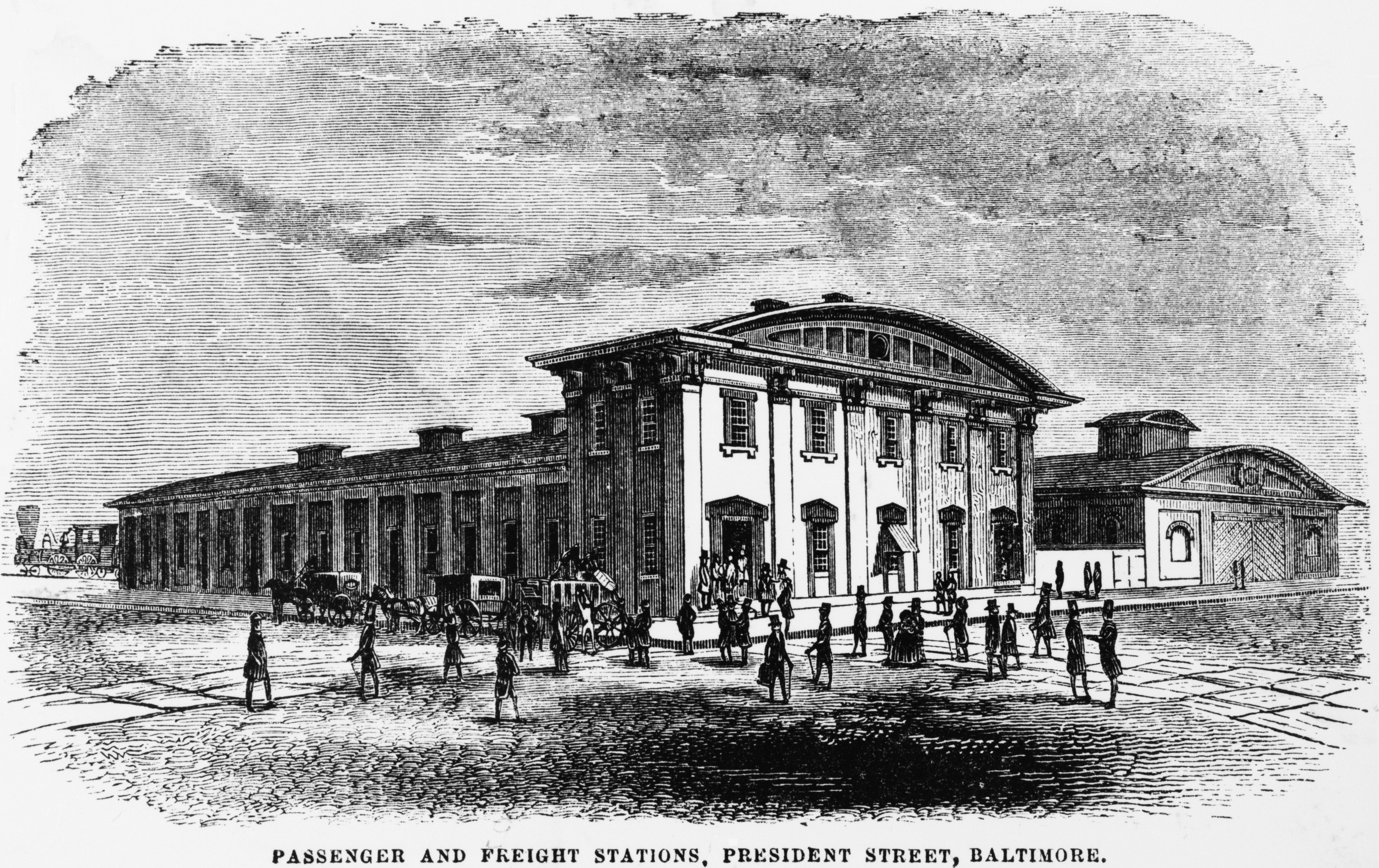
President Street Station in Baltimore, built between 1849 and 1850; a portion of the station is still standing and is home to the Baltimore Civil War Museum.

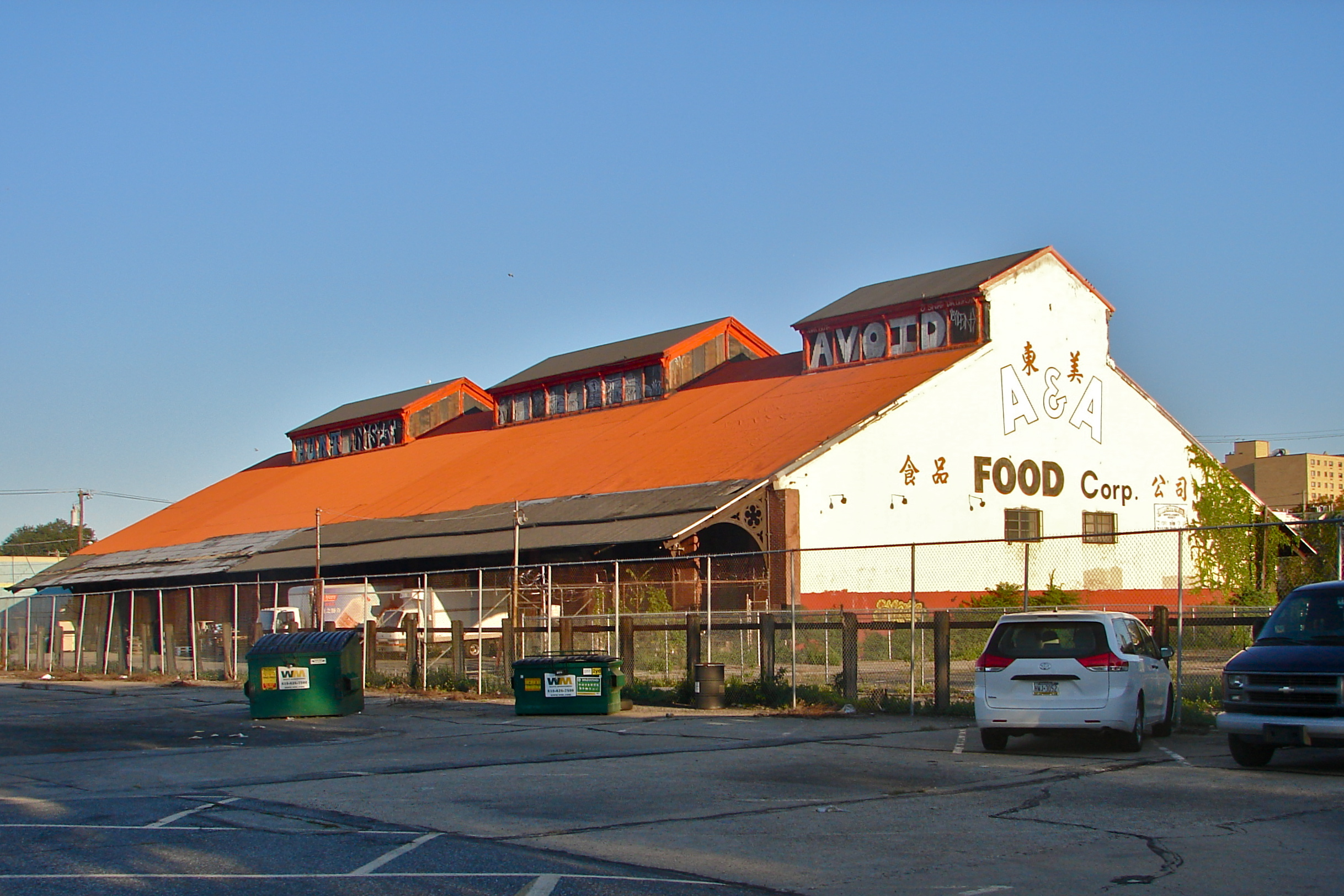
A Philadelphia, Wilmington and Baltimore Railroad freight shed, now a Sprouts Farmers Market, on Carpenter Street between Broad and 15th Streets in Philadelphia, named to the National Register of Historic Places on September 8, 2011)

The PW&B started as four railroads:

- The Philadelphia and Delaware Counties Rail-Road Company (P&DC), chartered by the General Assembly of Pennsylvania on April 2, 1831
- The Wilmington and Susquehanna Rail Road Company (W&S), chartered by the state of Delaware on January 18, 1832
- The Baltimore and Port Deposite Rail Road Company (B&PD), chartered by the state of Maryland on March 5, 1832
- The Delaware and Maryland Rail Road Company (D&M), chartered by Maryland on March 14, 1832

These grew from efforts by the three mid-Atlantic states of Pennsylvania, Delaware, and Maryland to create a rail line between Philadelphia and Baltimore. Pennsylvania was seeking to improve transportation between Philadelphia and points south along the Atlantic coast and Eastern seaboard, and so the legislature chartered the P&DC in 1831 and allotted $200,000 to build a rail line from America's largest city to the Delaware state line. Further south, across the Mason–Dixon line, the Delaware and Maryland legislatures, were doing their part to create a rail link to Wilmington and Baltimore. Less than a year later, the State of Delaware chartered the W&S and allotted $400,000 to build a rail line from Wilmington to the Maryland state line. At almost the same time, the State of Maryland chartered the B&PD (with $1,000,000) to build from Baltimore northeast the western bank of the Susquehanna River and the D&M (with $3,000,000) to build from Port Deposit or any other point on the Susquehanna's eastern river bank north to the Delaware line.

In July 1835, the W&S hired architect/surveyor William Strickland to make a preliminary survey to the southwest between Wilmington and North East, Maryland. In October, the surveyors reported that the best option, a 17-mile line, would cost $233,000 to build. That same year, the B&PD began operating trains between Baltimore Harbor's basin at the present-day Inner Harbor waterfront and its Canton industrial, commercial, and residential neighborhood to the southeast. But Matthew Newkirk, who had invested $50,000 in the B&PD, including funds borrowed from the United States Bank, grew impatient. On Oct. 6, he wrote to the company's board "demanding that Pres. Finley resign and be replaced by someone who will be more aggressive in collecting from delinquent subscribers and pushing project forward." As alternates, Newkirk suggested Roswell L. Colt or lawyer John H. B. Latrobe, the brother of Chief Engineer Benjamin H. Latrobe II and grandson of architect Benjamin Henry Latrobe. Six days later, Colt became president, but he was replaced five weeks later by Lewis Brantz.

In 1836, P&DC opened its first segment of track; saw its allowable expenditures upped by the state to $400,000; and changed its name, on March 14, to The Philadelphia, Wilmington and Baltimore Railroad Company. On July 4, the PW&B began building its bridge over the Schuylkill River, the most significant obstacle on its part of the route and completed their entire line, but for the bridge, in 1837. The Schuulkill River bridge crossed at Gray's Ferry Bridge, south of the city and was opened in 1838.

Work also proceeded in Delaware and Maryland where on April 18, 1836 the D&M merged with the W&S, forming the Wilmington and Susquehanna Railroad Company. By July 1837, there was continuous track from Baltimore to Wilmington, broken only by the wide Susquehanna River, which trains crossed by steam-powered ferryboats between Havre de Grace and Perryville. That year, the railroad ordered seven 4-2-0 steam locomotives from Norris Locomotive Works; it would order two more in or about 1840.

=== 1838: Merger ===
On January 15, 1838, the PW&B began service from Wilmington to Gray's Ferry, then a few miles south of Philadelphia's city limits. Passengers debarking at Gray's Ferry were taken by horse-drawn omnibus into the city.

The disadvantages of tripartite ownership of the Philadelphia-Baltimore line became obvious, and the three remaining state-chartered railroads merged on February 12, 1838, to form the Philadelphia, Wilmington and Baltimore Railroad Company. (The new company's name differed from its predecessor's in that "The" at the beginning of the titled name was not part of its formal incorporated name.)

Among the passengers that year was Frederick Douglass, a slave who escaped his Baltimore owner by boarding a PB&W train, perhaps at Canton or somewhere east of where the President Street Station would be built in 1849, and riding it northeast to Philadelphia. To avoid detention, Douglass, a future world-famous abolitionist, statesman, Federal official, orator and publisher, borrowed a "seaman's protection", a document obtained by his future wife, a free black woman, which was normally carried by free black sailors, of which there were many in the merchant fleets and the navy. Later, the railroad would require black passengers to have "a responsible white person" sign a bond at the ticket office before allowing them to board.

In December 1838, the PB&W completed its Schuylkill bridge at Gray's Ferry. Named the "Newkirk Viaduct" after PW&B president Matthew Newkirk, it allowed trains to run from downtown Philadelphia to downtown Baltimore, with only the Susquehanna River steam railroad ferry interrupting the ride. (The railroad marked this achievement by erecting the Newkirk Viaduct Monument, a 15-foot marble obelisk designed by Thomas Ustick Walter, a future Architect of the Capitol.) The Baltimore and Ohio Railroad (B&O) began using the tracks that same year to offer service northeast of Baltimore to Philadelphia.

The Susquehanna interruption was eventually bridged under pressure of the heavy traffic needs in 1864–5, the later days of the Civil War. After a disastrous storm damaged the new spans, reconstruction began anew and was completed by 1866. In November 1866, the Susquehanna River was bridged at last by the PW&B Bridge, a 3,269-foot (996 m) wooden truss, finally creating a continuous rail connection between Philadelphia and Baltimore.

In Baltimore, the PW&B's terminus and business office sat at the southwest corner of President and Fleet Streets, east of the Jones Falls, the eventual future site of the President Street Station. The line ran east along Fleet Street, turned southeast onto Boston Street and ran along the waterfront past Canton before turning northeast and leaving the city limits, heading east, then northeast towards the Susquehanna.

In Philadelphia, the line ended at Broad Street and Prime Avenue, which is now Washington Avenue, where it connected with the Southwark Rail-Road, built in 1835, to reach the Delaware River.

In 1839, the railroad's ticket agents advertised daily mail-and-passenger trains that left Baltimore's old original Pratt Street station at South Charles Street of the B&O (before 1857-65 construction of the now-famous Camden Street Station) at 9:30 a.m., stopped for lunch in Wilmington, Delaware, and reached the Market Street depot in Philadelphia at 4 p.m.

In 1844, Samuel Morse arranged for the B&O line to reach Washington, D.C., from Philadelphia and Baltimore by agreeing to allow the builder to use the PW&B right-of-way in exchange for the use of the communications equipment.

==== Expansion into Delaware ====
The PB&W expanded into Delaware on March 15, 1839, when it purchased the New Castle and Frenchtown Railroad which ran from New Castle, Delaware, to Frenchtown, Maryland. However, it took 13 years to connect this line to the rest of the PW&B system. To bridge this gap, the New Castle and Wilmington Railroad was chartered in 1839 and opened in late 1852. To expand the railroad south into the Delmarva Peninsula, the PW&B financed construction of the Delaware Railroad, which in 1856 connected to the combined lines at Bear, Delaware. The PW&B took over operations of the Delaware RR on January 1, 1857. In 1859, the NC&F was abandoned west of the junction with the Delaware Railroad at Bear. By 1866, these moves and others allowed the PW&B to dominate the Delmarva Peninsula rail market.

=== 1840s-1870s ===
In 1842, Newkirk resigned as PW&B president. He was replaced by Matthew Brooke Buckley (1794-1856), who had become a PW&B board member on Jan. 10, 1842, and one week later had taken over leadership of one of the railroad's three executive committees, the Northern one. As president, Buckley helped create the first telegraph line.

On January 12, 1846, Buckley was replaced by Edward C. Dale, a grandson of Richard Dale, one of the U.S. Navy's first commodores.

Between 1846 and 1849, the railroad ordered five more locomotives, likely 4-4-0s, from the Norris Works.

In February 1850, the PW&B improved its Baltimore terminus with a new station with a 208-foot (63 m) barrel-vaulted train shed. Because locomotives were not allowed to transfer through the city—possibly for fire safety reasons—service onward to Washington was facilitated by drawing the coaches by horse down Pratt Street to the B&O terminal, first at East Pratt and South Charles Streets, and, after 1857, to the new Camden Street Station. Unwieldy as it was, the arrangement allowed the railroads to temporarily compete with the Philadelphia and Columbia Railroad (renamed Pennsylvania Railroad after 1857) on routes going west from Philadelphia. By 1853, the Camden and Amboy Railroad and New Jersey Railroad were also part of this agreement, providing through service from New York City to the West.

In 1861, one week after the American Civil War began at Fort Sumter, an angry mob of Southern sympathizers attacked a trainload of future Union Army soldiers at the PW&B's President Street Station, starting a street battle that spread to the Camden Street Station. This Pratt Street Riot produced the war's first deaths of Union volunteers by hostile action and set the nation irrevocably on the path to war.

From 1863 to 1865, the railroad ordered ten 4-4-0 locomotives from the Norris Works.

==== Darby Improvement ====
To avoid swampy areas and serve more populated ones, the PW&B built the Darby Improvement, which diverged from its existing main line just south of the Grays Ferry Bridge, passed through Darby, and rejoined it at Eddystone, just upriver from Chester. The new inland track opened on November 18, 1872. The PW&B dispensed with the 9.9-mile old alignment less than a year later, leasing it on July 1, 1873, to the Philadelphia and Reading Railway for 999 years with the stipulation that it would be used solely for freight. (The Reading dubbed the line, along with some connecting track, its Philadelphia and Chester Branch; southbound trains reached it via the Junction Railroad (jointly controlled by PW&B, Reading, and PRR) and continued on to the connecting Chester and Delaware River Railroad).

=== Growing alliance with the PRR ===
The PW&B, which had competed so fiercely with the Pennsylvania, began to see their interests align. In 1873, the PRR opened the Baltimore and Potomac Rail Road (founded 1853, organized 1858), from Baltimore to Washington. The PW&B agreed to allow the PRR to use its track between Philadelphia and Baltimore, helping the PRR offer a shorter and more direct trip to Washington.

On May 15, 1877, the PW&B formally absorbed the New Castle and Frenchtown and New Castle and Wilmington railroads, forming a branch line from Wilmington to Rodney. On May 21, 1877, it absorbed the Southwark railroad, extending its main line to Philadelphia's Delaware River waterfront.

In 1880, a conflict began between the PRR and the B&O, both of which operated over the PW&B. The B&O was working to reduce its reliance on PRR tracks; it had recently arranged to switch its Philadelphia-New York trains to the new Reading Railroad-controlled "Bound Brook Route," which had recently broken the PRR's monopoly on travel to New York via New Jersey. At the time, northbound B&O trains left the PW&B at Gray's Ferry Bridge in southwest Philadelphia and traveled over the Junction Railroad to Belmont, where they reached Reading rails and continued north. However, a mile of the Junction Railroad's track through Philadelphia was owned and used by the PRR, which showed great ingenuity in arranging delays to B&O trains.

The irate John W. Garrett (1820–84), the Civil War-era president of Baltimore and Ohio Railroad, decided to counter-attack by quietly buying out the PW&B, which would have cut off the Pennsylvania Railroad from its Baltimore & Potomac subsidiary. However, his agent encountered unexpected difficulties in buying up a majority of the stock at the price specified. Meanwhile, Garrett's maneuver became known to the PRR, which quickly bought out a majority of the stock at a somewhat higher price, preemptively taking control of the PW&B. Garrett and the Baltimore and Ohio were forced later to construct an independent separate northeast line to Philadelphia, the Baltimore and Philadelphia Railroad, while paying the PRR substantial fees to continue service further north to New York City over their lines. The new line opened in 1886; the Reading also used it to avoid the Junction Railroad.

A number of branches were built, bought and sold from 1881 to 1891, as described below. In 1895, the main line was realigned and straightened at Naaman's Creek in Delaware. The old line would become sidings for Claymont Steel.

In March 1891, the Delaware, Maryland and Virginia Railroad defaulted on its mortgages and the PW&B took control of the company.

The PRR's Baltimore and Potomac Rail Road was formally leased to the PW&B on November 1, 1891.

The Elkton and Middletown Railroad, opened in 1895, was planned as a cutoff between the main line at Elkton, Maryland, and the Delaware Railroad at Middletown, Delaware. However, only a short piece of track, serving industries in Elkton, was ever constructed. It was consolidated into the Philadelphia, Baltimore and Washington Railroad on September 15, 1916.

An 1895 historian of the PRR had this to say about the significance of the PW&B, which it had acquired and gained control of fourteen years before:

An important constituent of a great North and South line of transportation, it challenges ocean competition and carries on its rails not only statesmen and tourists but a valuable interchange of products between different lines of latitude. As a military highway, it is of the greatest strategic importance to the national, industrial, and commercial capitals – Washington, Philadelphia and New York. It presents some of the very best transportation facilities to the commerce of the cities after which it is named and could not be obliterated from the railroad map of the United States without materially disturbing its harmony.

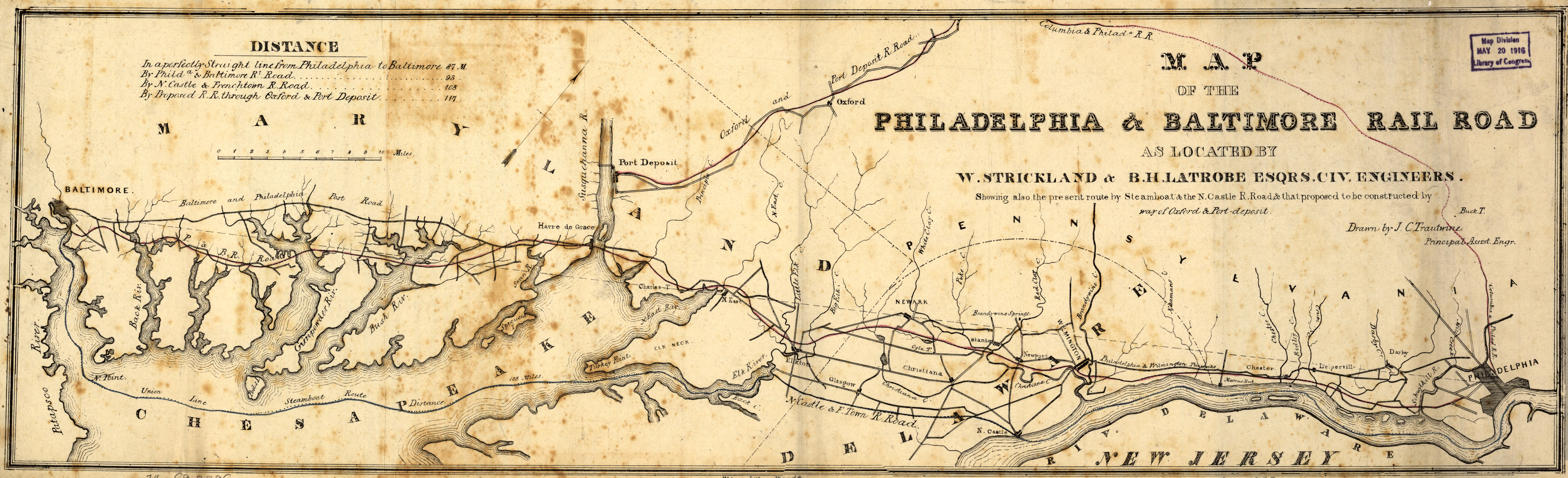
Map of the Philadelphia, Wilmington and Baltimore Railroad, c. 1850

=== Philadelphia, Baltimore and Washington Railroad ===
The PW&B merged with the Baltimore and Potomac on November 1, 1902, to form the Philadelphia, Baltimore and Washington Railroad.

== Branches ==
- Southwark
- 60th Street/Chester: Built in 1918, it stretched 4.5 miles (7.2 km) from South 58th Street in Philadelphia, Pennsylvania, to Hog Island, Pennsylvania.
- South Chester
- Edgemoor
- Augustine Mill: Also called the Brandywine Branch, it was built in 1882 from Landlith north along the Brandywine Creek to reach the Augustine Mills of the Jessup & Moore Paper Company, and was later extended further north to serve the Kentmere and Rockford Mills of Joseph Bancroft & Sons.
- Shellpot: Also called the Shellpot Cutoff, it was built in 1888 from Edgemoor (near the crossing of the Shellpot Creek) around the south side of Wilmington to a point on the main line between Wilmington and Newport. It served as a freight bypass, to avoid what was then street running on the main line through Wilmington.
- Delaware Branch: Formed from the old New Castle & Frenchtown and New Castle & Wilmington trackage between Wilmington and Rodney, via New Castle. It was sold to the Delaware Railroad in 1891.
- New Castle Cut-off: Built in 1888 from a point on the Shellpot Branch just across the Christina River from Cherry Island, south to New Castle and a connection with the Delaware Branch. It was sold with the Delaware Branch to the Delaware Railroad in 1891.
- Delaware City: Sold by the Newark and Delaware City Railroad to the PW&B in 1881. It ran south and east from the main line at Newark to Delaware City.
- Port Deposit: Built in 1866 up the Susquehanna River from Perryville to the river town of Port Deposit. In 1893, it was sold to the Columbia and Port Deposit Railway, also PRR-controlled, which connected with it at Port Deposit.
- Baltimore Union
- Reybold Industrial Track: From Newark to Delaware City. Sold by the Newark and Delaware City Railroad Company to the PW&B in 1881.

== See also ==
- Baltimore and Philadelphia Railroad
- History of rail transport in Philadelphia
- Newkirk Viaduct Monument
- Philadelphia, Wilmington and Baltimore Railroad Freight Shed

Preceded by The Philadelphia, Wilmington and Baltimore Railroad Company; Baltimore and Port Deposite Rail Road Company; The Wilmington and Susquehanna Railroad Company The New Castle and Frenchtown Turnpike and Rail Road Company (merged May 15, 1877); The New Castle and Wilmington Railroad Company (merged May 15, 1877) Southwark Rail-Road Company (merged May 21, 1877)	Philadelphia, Wilmington and Baltimore Railroad Company formed by merger February 12, 1838 merged November 1, 1902	Succeeded by Philadelphia, Baltimore and Washington Railroad
Preceded by	The Philadelphia and Delaware County Rail-Road Company chartered April 2, 1831 organized May 23, 1831 name changed March 14, 1836	Succeeded by Philadelphia, Wilmington and Baltimore Railroad Company
Preceded by The Philadelphia and Delaware County Rail-Road Company	The Philadelphia, Wilmington and Baltimore Railroad Company name changed March 14, 1836 merged February 12, 1838	Succeeded by Philadelphia, Wilmington and Baltimore Railroad Company
Preceded by	Baltimore and Port Deposite Rail Road Company chartered March 5, 1832 merged February 12, 1838	Succeeded by Philadelphia, Wilmington and Baltimore Railroad Company
Preceded by	The Wilmington and Susquehanna Rail Road Company chartered January 18, 1832 merged April 18, 1836	Succeeded by The Wilmington and Susquehanna Railroad Company
Preceded by	Delaware and Maryland Rail Road Company chartered March 14, 1832 merged April 18, 1836	Succeeded by The Wilmington and Susquehanna Railroad Company
Preceded by The Wilmington and Susquehanna Rail Road Company; Delaware and Maryland Rail Road Company	The Wilmington and Susquehanna Railroad Company formed by merger April 18, 1836 merged February 12, 1838	Succeeded by Philadelphia, Wilmington and Baltimore Railroad Company
