= Cheltenham station (SEPTA) =

Railway station in Cheltenham, Pennsylvania

Cheltenham
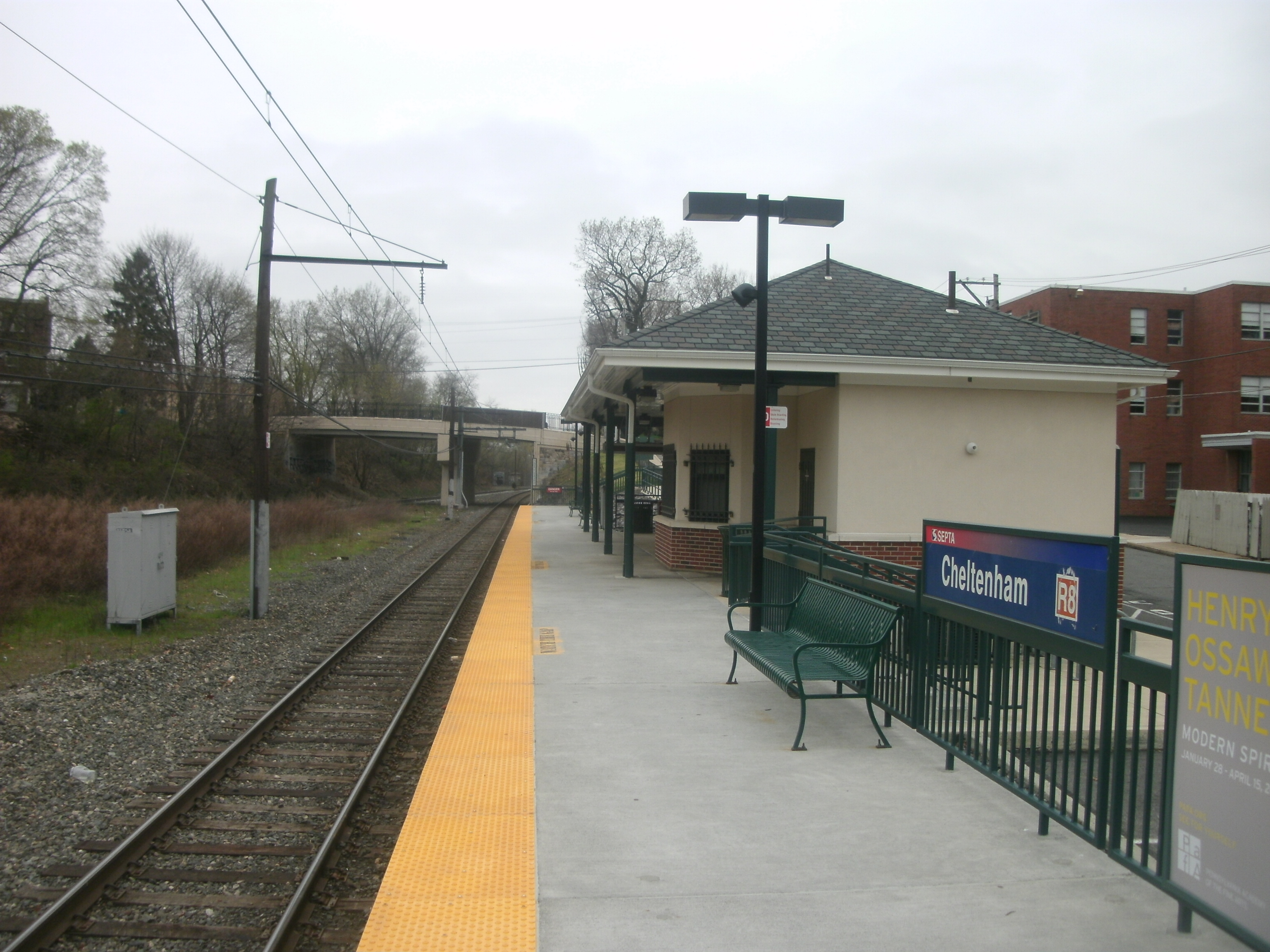
- Cheltenham station in March 2012, after construction of the new high level platform.

General information
- Location: Old Soldiers Road and Hasbrook Avenue; Cheltenham, Pennsylvania 19012
- Coordinates: 40.057258°N 75.092722°W
- Owner: SEPTA
- Line: Fox Chase Branch
- Platforms: 1 side platform
- Tracks: 1

Construction
- Parking: 17 spaces
- Cycle facilities: Yes
- Accessible: Yes

Other information
- Fare zone: 2

History
- Opened: 1893
- Rebuilt: 1993, 2007
- Former names: Cheltenham Junction

Key dates
- February 4, 1993: Station depot burned

Passengers
- 2017: 293 boardings 251 alightings (weekday average)
- Rank: 91 of 146

Services
| Preceding station | SEPTA | Following station |
|---|---|---|
| Lawndale toward Penn Medicine Station | Fox Chase Line | Ryers toward Fox Chase |
Former services
| Preceding station | Reading Railroad | Following station |
|---|---|---|
| Lawndale toward Philadelphia | Newtown Branch | Fox Chase toward Newtown |
Location

Cheltenham station is a SEPTA Regional Rail station in Cheltenham, Pennsylvania. Located at Old Soldiers Road and Hasbrook Avenue, it serves the Fox Chase Line. The station has a 17-space parking lot. In FY 2013, Cheltenham station had a weekday average of 267 boardings and 392 alightings.

Until 2005, CSX's Trenton Subdivision freight line and the Fox Chase Line shared track from Newtown Junction to a point just south of Cheltenham station, where SEPTA trains utilized a crossover to travel to/from the freight track. These tracks are now segregated, with a siding having been installed between Cheltenham and Lawndale stations for SEPTA use during peak hours. Further north, the freight line eventually joins SEPTA's West Trenton Line between Neshaminy Falls and Langhorne although the tracks no longer connect, and outbound passengers must now cross the inbound track to exit the station.

Cheltenham station serves the Burholme neighborhood of Northeast Philadelphia and the eastern part of Cheltenham Township.

== History ==
The 1893 station depot at Cheltenham was under consideration for SEPTA to be demolished and replaced with a trailer for the ticket agent. However, on the morning of February 4, 1993, the station depot caught fire. Firefighters took 17 minutes to put the fire out, but the station depot was a total loss. Fire investigators stated that the depot was not an accident and ruled an arson.

The station was replaced with a trailer serving as the ticket office. A new station and high-level platforms were opened in October 2007.
