= Herman J. Lombaert =

Herman Joseph Lombaert (1816–1885) was an American civil engineer who helped complete the first railroad between Philadelphia, Pennsylvania, and Baltimore, Maryland, and eventually became a vice-president of the Pennsylvania Railroad (PRR).

== Biography ==
Lombaert was born on Oct. 30, 1816, in Easton, Pennsylvania, the son of Charles (1790-1875) and Anna Arndt Lombaert (1794-1879). In the 1830s, Charles was a company officer or contractor for several railroads, including the Philadelphia and Trenton Railroad (P&T).

After Herman Lombaert completed his civil engineering studies, he took a job with the P&T under engineer Samuel H. Kneass (1806-1858), with whom he helped build the main line. In 1836, Kneass and Lombaert helped survey the prospective route of the Philadelphia, Wilmington, and Baltimore Railroad (PW&B) from the Delaware state line to its initial Philadelphia terminus at the intersection of Broad Street and Moyamensing Avenue. Lombaert was the target bearer, while Kneass' younger brother Strickland Kneass was the chain carrier. The line became the first rail link from Philadelphia to Baltimore (and survives today as part of Amtrak's Northeast Corridor).

In 1838, Charles Lombaert was one of three superintendents of construction for the PW&B. Herman, the son, had moved up from his job on the surveying team to the post of assistant engineer, under Samuel Kneass, for the Philadelphia-Wilmington stretch. And in the meantime, Kneass had become not just Herman's boss but his brother-in-law: on March 14, 1837, Kneass married Herman's sister Anna (1814-1869) in Morrisville, Pennsylvania.

Herman Lombaert's work on the PW&B was noted (along with that of his father and brother-in-law) on the 1839 Newkirk Viaduct Monument in Philadelphia.

In 1851, Herman Lombaert became assistant superintendent of the PRR, under Herman Haupt. The following year, he became the railroad's superintendent.

In 1853, a young Andrew Carnegie was working for Thomas A. Scott, then the superintendent of the PRR's Pittsburgh division (and later PRR president). Lombaert, who was Scott's boss, invited the 18-year-old Carnegie for tea. In his autobiography, Carnegie described Lombaert as "the great man in our railroad field ... not sociable, but stern and unbending." (He found Sarah Lombaert "exceedingly kind".)

From 1857 to 1858, Lombaert was a trustee of Lafayette College.

In 1862, he became a vice president of the PRR.

In 1871, he became president of the American Steamship Company of Philadelphia, a shipping company launched with PRR investment, and the following year resigned from the railroad.

== Personal life ==
On May 2, 1844, he married Sarah Cochran (1820-1890) in Chester, Pennsylvania. That same year, he traveled to Colombia to lay out a route for a canal to connect the city of Cartagena with the Magdalena River.

Herman Lombaert died on March 10, 1885, in Philadelphia.
