= George School station =

Railway station in Pennsylvania, United States

George School
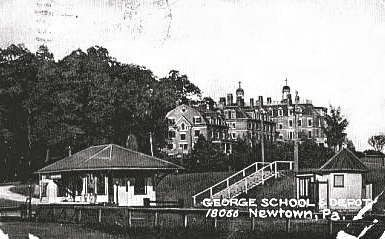
- George School station, c. 1905

General information
- Location: George School, Middletown, Pennsylvania
- Coordinates: 40.2123°N 74.9389°W
- System: Former railroad station
- Owner: SEPTA
- Tracks: 1

Construction
- Structure type: demolished

History
- Opened: 1905 (RDG)
- Closed: January 18, 1983

Former services
Preceding station	SEPTA	Following station
Holland toward Reading Terminal	Newtown Line	Newtown Terminus
Preceding station	Reading Railroad	Following station
Holland toward Philadelphia	Newtown Branch	Newtown Terminus
Location

George School station is a defunct railroad station at George School, a private Quaker boarding and day high school in Middletown Township, Bucks County, Pennsylvania. The original station was built by the Philadelphia, Newtown and New York Railroad in 1893 and burned in 1905. It was replaced with a station that was moved from Huntingdon Valley, further down the Newtown Branch. That station was demolished in 1971. A cinder 'platform' was used as a flagstop by both the Reading Railroad and SEPTA Regional Rail. SEPTA closed the station and several others in 1983 when train service was suspended.

== History ==
George School station was a stop on the Reading Railroad's Newtown Line. The Philadelphia, Newtown & New York Railroad (PN&NY) constructed the station as an inducement for the George School founders to choose this site (originally the Worth Farm) over three others in final consideration. The PN&NY also offered to haul all building materials for the Main building at their cost, as an additional incentive. There was also a passing siding and a coal trestle at the site. The stone piers for the trestle still remain, although the tracks and steel supports were removed during the 1960s. The PN&NY was later absorbed into the Reading Railroad system. It later became a part of SEPTA's Fox Chase Rapid Transit Line. The station, and all of those north of Fox Chase, was closed on January 18, 1983, due to failing diesel train equipment.

In addition, a labor dispute began within the SEPTA organization when the transit operator inherited 1,700 displaced employees from Conrail. SEPTA insisted on utilizing transit operators from the Broad Street Subway to operate Fox Chase–Newtown diesel trains, while Conrail requested that railroad engineers continue to run the service. When a federal court ruled that SEPTA had to use Conrail employees in order to offer job assurance, SEPTA cancelled Fox Chase–Newtown trains. Service in the diesel-only territory north of Fox Chase was "temporarily suspended" at that time, and George School station still appears in publicly posted tariffs.

Although rail service was initially replaced with a Fox Chase–Newtown shuttle bus, patronage remained light, and the Fox Chase–Newtown shuttle bus service ended on November 30, 1998.
