= Lawndale station =

Railway station in Philadelphia

Lawndale
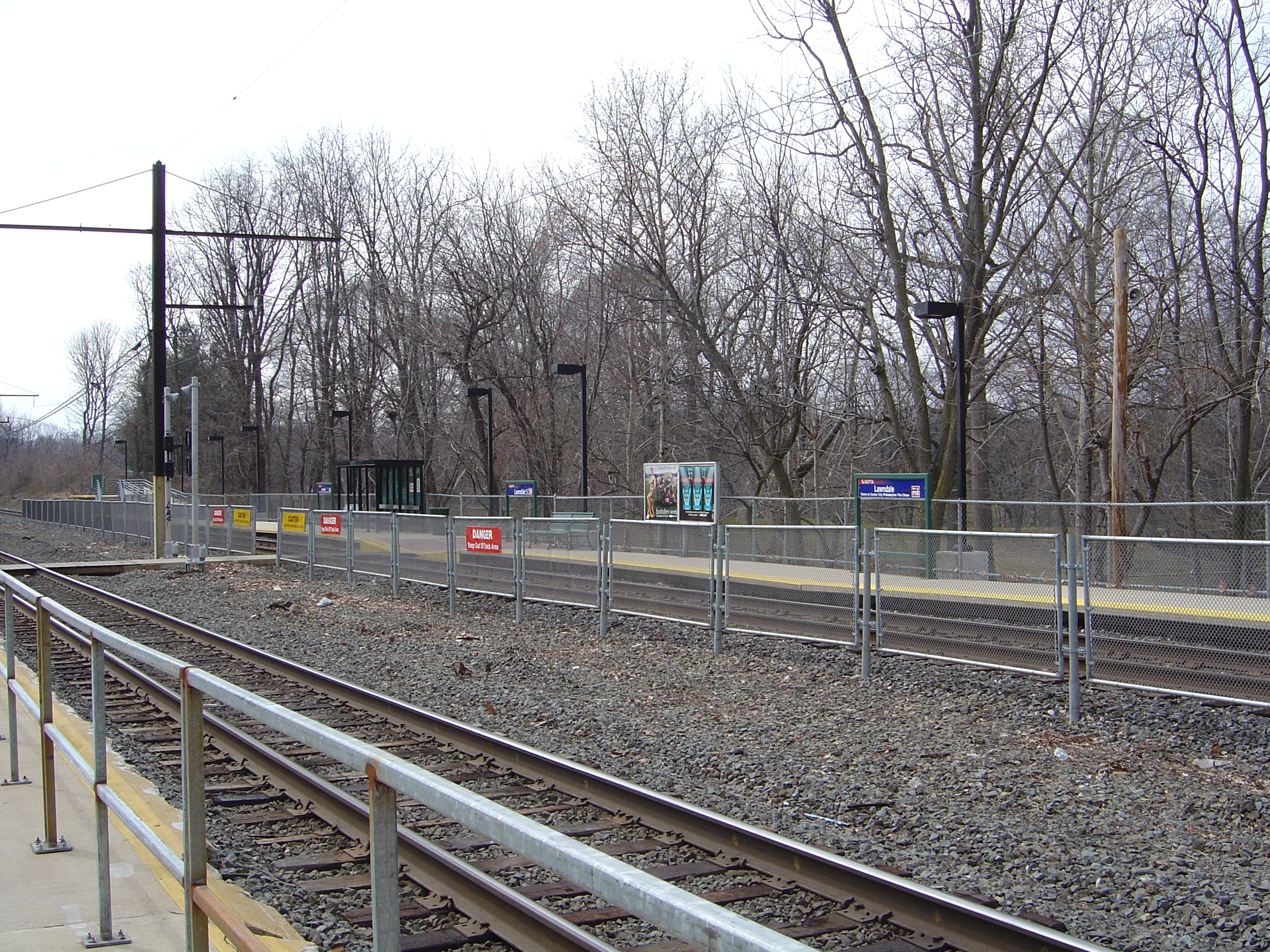
- Lawndale station

General information
- Location: Robbins and Newtown Avenues; Philadelphia, Pennsylvania, U.S.
- Coordinates: 40.051197°N 75.102764°W
- Owner: SEPTA
- Line: Fox Chase Branch
- Platforms: 1 side platform
- Tracks: 1

Construction
- Parking: No
- Accessible: yes

Other information
- Fare zone: 2

Services
Preceding station	SEPTA	Following station
Olney toward Penn Medicine Station	Fox Chase Line	Cheltenham toward Fox Chase
Former services
Preceding station	Reading Railroad	Following station
Olney toward Philadelphia	Newtown Branch	Cheltenham toward Newtown
Location

Lawndale station is a station located along SEPTA's Fox Chase Line. It is located at Robbins and Newtown Avenues and serves the Lawndale neighborhood of Northeast Philadelphia. The station has a small shelter and has no parking lot. In FY 2013, Lawndale station had a weekday average of 213 boardings and 201 alightings.

In 2005, SEPTA segregated CSX's Trenton Subdivision freight tracks and the Fox Chase Line passenger tracks that run parallel from Newtown Junction to just south of Cheltenham. Passengers may now only board from the west side platform.
