= Ryers station =

Railway station in Philadelphia

Ryers
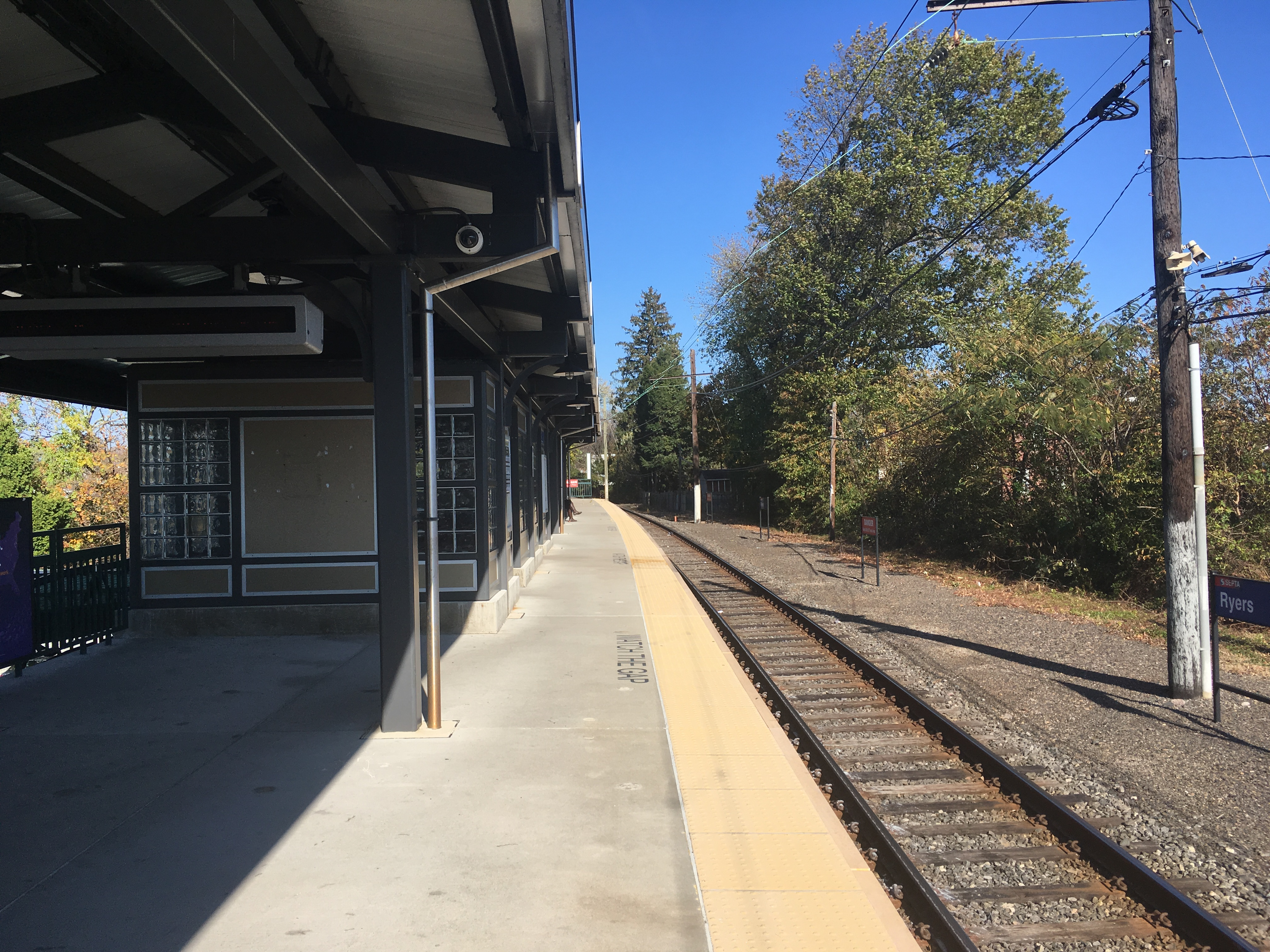
- The high-level platform at Ryers station looking towards Fox Chase in November 2019

General information
- Location: Cottman (PA 73) and Rockwell Avenues; Philadelphia, Pennsylvania, U.S.
- Coordinates: 40.063063°N 75.085748°W
- Owner: SEPTA
- Line: Fox Chase Branch
- Platforms: 1 side platform
- Tracks: 1
- Connections: SEPTA City Bus 24, 70, 77

Construction
- Parking: 71 spaces
- Accessible: yes

Other information
- Fare zone: 2

Passengers
- 2017: 357 boardings 330 alightings (weekday average)
- Rank: 76 of 146

Services
Preceding station	SEPTA	Following station
Cheltenham toward Penn Medicine Station	Fox Chase Line	Fox Chase Terminus
Location

Ryers Station is a railway station in Philadelphia, United States, on SEPTA's Newtown Line. It is located at Cottman and Rockwell Avenues and has a 71-space parking lot. In FY 2013, Ryers station had a weekday average of 402 boardings and 376 alightings. The station itself consists of a new high-level platform and shelter, completed in early 2012.

== Gallery ==
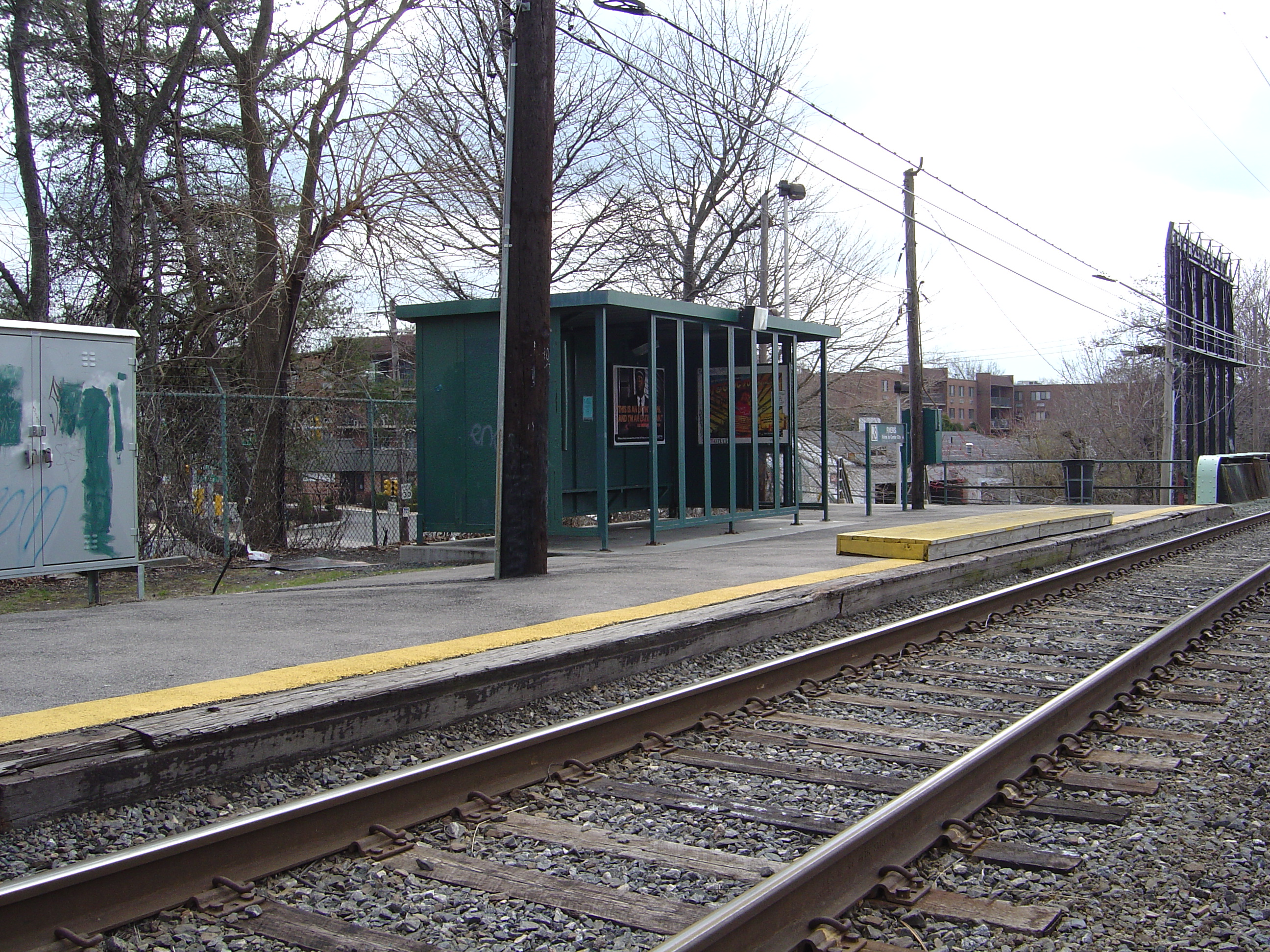
The former low-level platform station at Ryers as seen in 2006

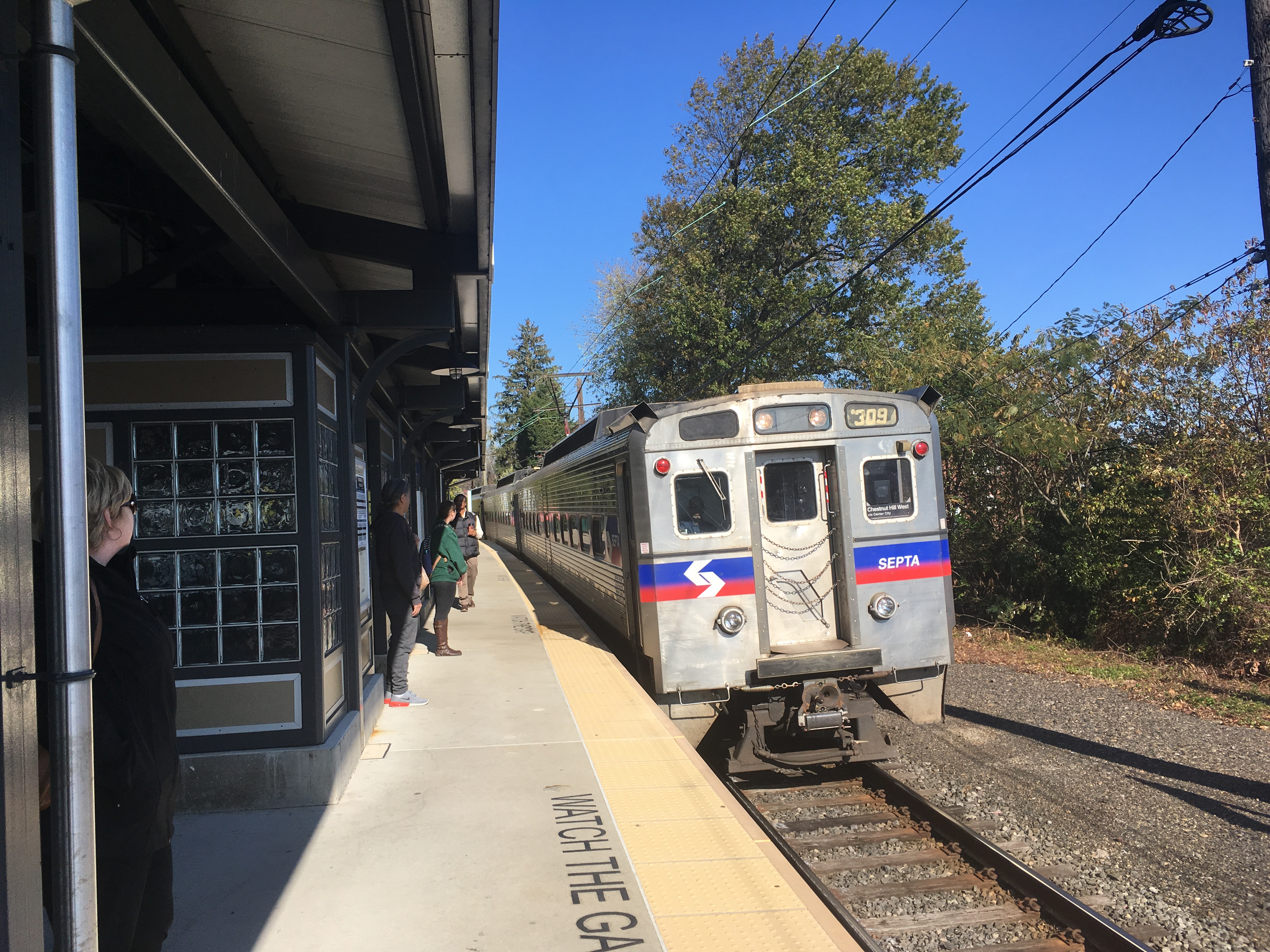
A Center City-bound train stops at Ryers station in November 2019
