= Frankford Branch =

Overview
- Status: Abandoned

History
- Opened: 29 June 1894

Technical
- Line length: 2.6 mi (4.2 km)
- Track gauge: 1,435 mm (4 ft 8 1/2 in) standard gauge

The Frankford Branch was a railway line located in the city of Philadelphia in the United States. Its opening in 1894 provided residents of the Frankford neighborhood with direct access to the Reading Terminal. It was part of the Reading system until its 1976 conveyance to Conrail. Conrail abandoned the branch in the 1990s.

== History ==
The branch was constructed between 1892 and 1894 by the Philadelphia and Frankford Railroad, a subsidiary of the Philadelphia and Reading Railroad and forerunner of the Reading Company.

The line branched off from Reading's Newtown Branch at Frankford Junction, (Note: Not to be confused with the more famous Frankford Junction on the Northeast Corridor.) east of Olney. The ceremonial opening of the line took place on June 29, 1894, with scheduled services beginning on July 2.

The line's original terminus was Frankford Station, near Frankford Avenue and Unity Street. The Frankford extension of the Market–Frankford Line, which opened in 1922, led to the Reading closing this station in 1928.

The Philadelphia and Frankford Railroad was one of twelve Reading properties merged at the end of 1923 to create the new Reading Company.

The Frankford Branch was one of many Reading lines conveyed to Conrail in 1976 as a result of the Reading's bankruptcy.

Conrail abandoned the line in the mid-1990s, prior to the CSX Transportation / Norfolk Southern Railway acquisition. (Note: Compare the 1995 and 1997 Conrail track charts.)
