= Churchville station =

Railway station in Pennsylvania, United States

Churchville
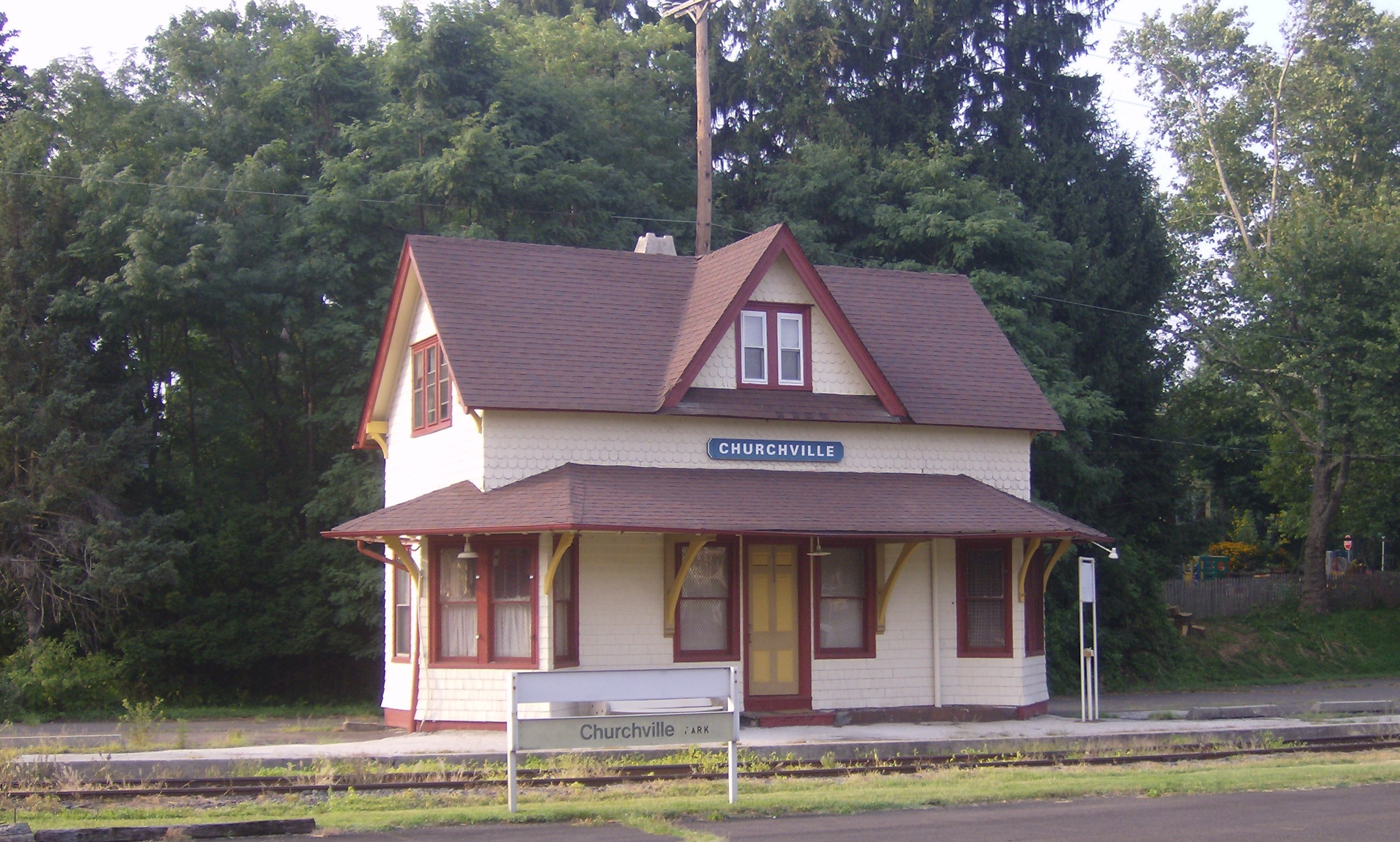
- Churchville station site in 2006

General information
- Location: Knowles Avenue and Bustleton Pike; Churchville, Pennsylvania
- Coordinates: 40.1849°N 75.0137°W
- Owner: SEPTA
- Platforms: 1 side platform
- Tracks: 1

Construction
- Platform levels: 1
- Parking: 25 spaces

History
- Opened: February 4, 1878
- Closed: January 18, 1983
- Rebuilt: 1892

Former services
Preceding station	SEPTA	Following station
Southampton toward Reading Terminal	Newtown Line	Holland toward Newtown
Preceding station	Reading Railroad	Following station
Southampton toward Philadelphia	Newtown Branch	Holland toward Newtown
- Churchville Train Station, Philadelphia and Reading Railroad
- U.S. Historic district – Contributing property
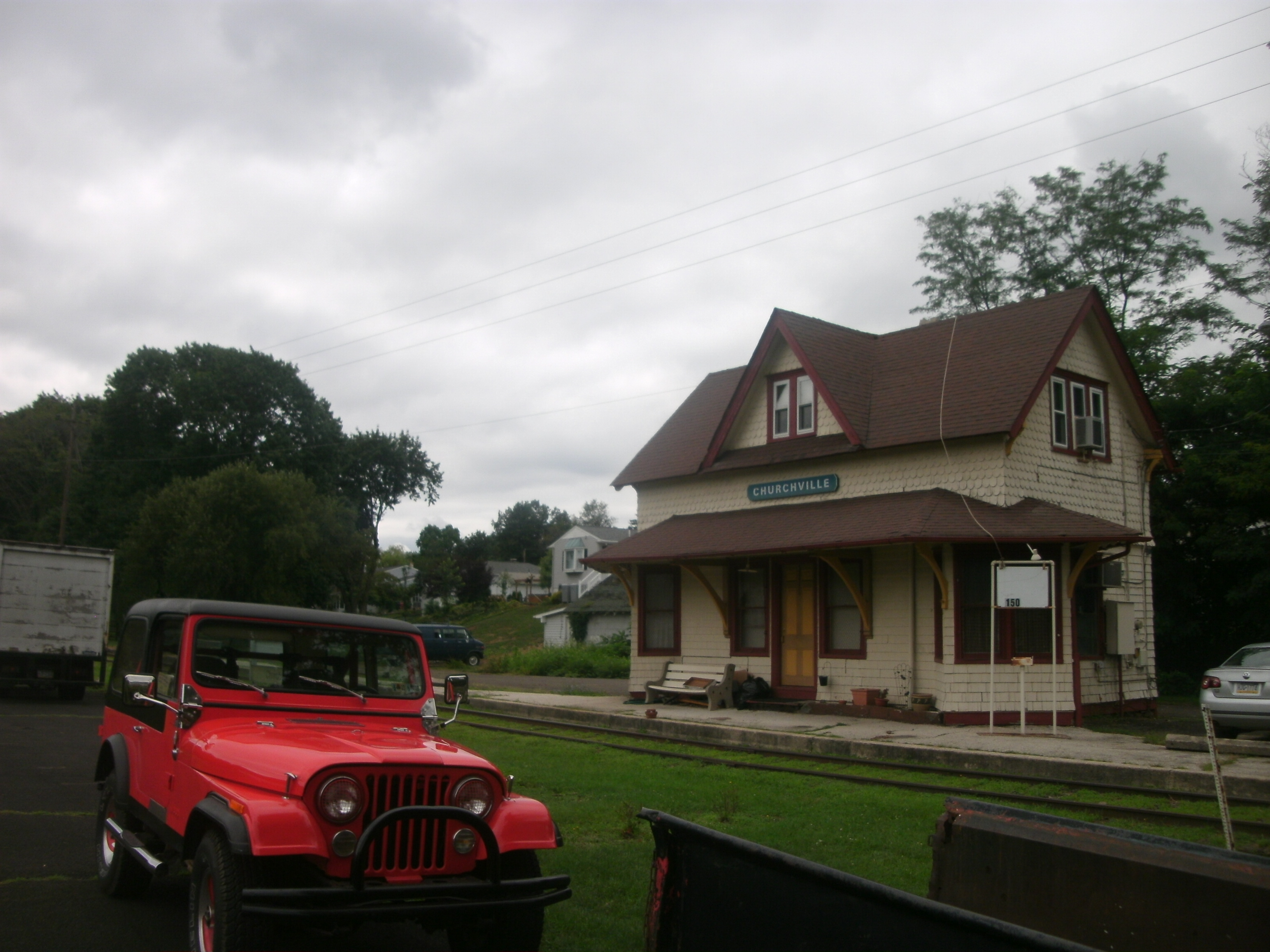
- Churchville station in July 2012.
- Interactive map of Churchville Train Station, Philadelphia and Reading Railroad
- Area: 185 acres (74.9 ha)
- Part of: Churchville Historic District (ID95000887)
- Designated CP: July 21, 1995
Location

Churchville station is a former train station in Churchville, Pennsylvania. Still owned by SEPTA and located on Knowles Avenue and Bustleton Pike, it is now a leased private residence.

The station was built in 1892, and served as a stop on the Reading Railroad's Newtown Line. It replaced another structure built in 1878. It was later taken over by SEPTA and served as a stop on the Fox Chase/Newtown Line.

== History ==
The station, built in 1892, was a stop on the Reading Railroad's Newtown Line, and a replacement for another structure built in 1878. It was later taken over by SEPTA and served as a stop on the Fox Chase/Newtown Line.

Churchville station, and all of those north of Fox Chase station, was closed on January 18, 1983 due to failing diesel train equipment resulting in low ridership.

In addition, a labor dispute began within the SEPTA organization when the transit operator inherited 1,700 displaced employees from Conrail. SEPTA insisted on utilizing transit operators from the Broad Street Subway to operate Fox Chase–Newtown diesel trains, while Conrail requested that railroad engineers run the service. When a federal court ruled that SEPTA had to use Conrail employees in order to offer job assurance, SEPTA cancelled Fox Chase–Newtown trains. Service in the diesel-only territory north of Fox Chase was cancelled at that time, and Churchville station still appears in publicly posted tariffs.

Although rail service was initially replaced with a Fox Chase–Newtown shuttle bus, patronage remained light, and the Fox Chase–Newtown shuttle bus service ended on November 30, 1998.

== Station building ==
Churchville station has been restored and is now used as a private residence. SEPTA signage—installed in 1984, one year after train service had ended—remains in place at the station parking lot. The station is a contributing property of the Churchville Historic District, which has been listed on the National Register of Historic Places since July 21, 1995.
