= Mercer and Somerset Railway =

Former railway in New Jersey, United States

The Mercer and Somerset Railway depicted on an 1876 New Jersey railroad map

The Mercer and Somerset Railway was a short-lived line of the Pennsylvania Railroad in western New Jersey, built to delay completion of the Delaware and Bound Brook Railroad, part of the National Railway line (later owned by the Philadelphia and Reading Railway) from Philadelphia, Pennsylvania to New York City.

The railroad ran from Somerset Junction on the Belvidere Delaware Rail Road via Pennington and Hopewell to Millstone. A connection to the Millstone and New Brunswick Railroad for a through route to New Brunswick. The bridges over the river and canal at East Millstone were completed by November 22, 1873 by January 10, 1874, the line was completed but only a portion was open to traffic the line was fully opened to traffic by March 7, 1874. The Mercer & Somerset Railway lost its battle with the Delaware and Bound Brook Railroad. Thus, it was bankrupt, defunct and dismantled by 1880. A stone pillar in the middle of the Millstone River just south of Amwell Road still remains today, built as part of the infrastructure to carry the tracks across the river. Hopewell was the site of a frog war with the National Railway.

A plan existed at one time to extend the Philadelphia, Newtown and New York Railroad, another railroad being built to block the National Railway, to cross the Delaware River and connect with the M&S.

== History ==
The railroad was chartered on March 17, 1870, by the United New Jersey Railroad and Canal Companies for the sole purpose of tying up the construction of the National Railway. In 1873, the M&S had plans to straighten out the line as part of a new through railroad operated by the PRR. No straightening was done, but it did become PRR-operated. The railroad was formally opened on February 6, 1874, with an excursion train from Millstone to Trenton. At the beginning, it was leased by the United New Jersey Railroad and Canal Company and operated by the Belvidere Delaware Rail Road. By mid-1875, the railroad was being operated by the PRR as their Mercer and Somerset Branch, part of a through route from New York. The M&S served as one of several legal challenges to the National Railway line from Philadelphia to New York. Others were the Philadelphia, Newtown and New York Railroad in Pennsylvania and a fight over whether they had the right to cross the Delaware River. The New Jersey-side one resulted in a frog war at Hopewell in early 1876. The National Railway won the battle, and the Delaware and Bound Brook Railroad formally opened on April 27, 1876.

The M&S was sold under bankruptcy to the Pennsylvania Railroad on November 28, 1879. The alignment was officially abandoned by the Pennsylvania on January 29, 1880.

It was soon dismantled, since it no longer served its purpose to block the National Railway. The abandoned grade of the west end of the line became Jacobs Creek Road.

== Station listing ==
Station	Location	Lines	Opened	Rebuilt	Agency closed	Station closed	Notes
Pennington	Pennington Borough	Mercer and Somerset Railway	1872	—	—	—	Station depot still stands
Hopewell	Hopewell Borough	Mercer and Somerset Railway	1874	—	—	—	
Stoutsburg	Hopewell Township	Mercer and Somerset Railway	1874	—	—	—	
Blawenburg	Montgomery Township	Mercer and Somerset Railway	1874	—	—	—	Station depot relocated off site and demolished in September 1930.
Harlingen	Montgomery Township	Mercer and Somerset Railway	1874	—	—	—	
Hillsborough	Hillsborough Township	Mercer and Somerset Railway	1874	—	—	—	
West Millstone	Hillsborough Township	Mercer and Somerset Railway	1874	—	—	—	
