= Holland station (SEPTA) =

Railway station in Pennsylvania, United States

Holland
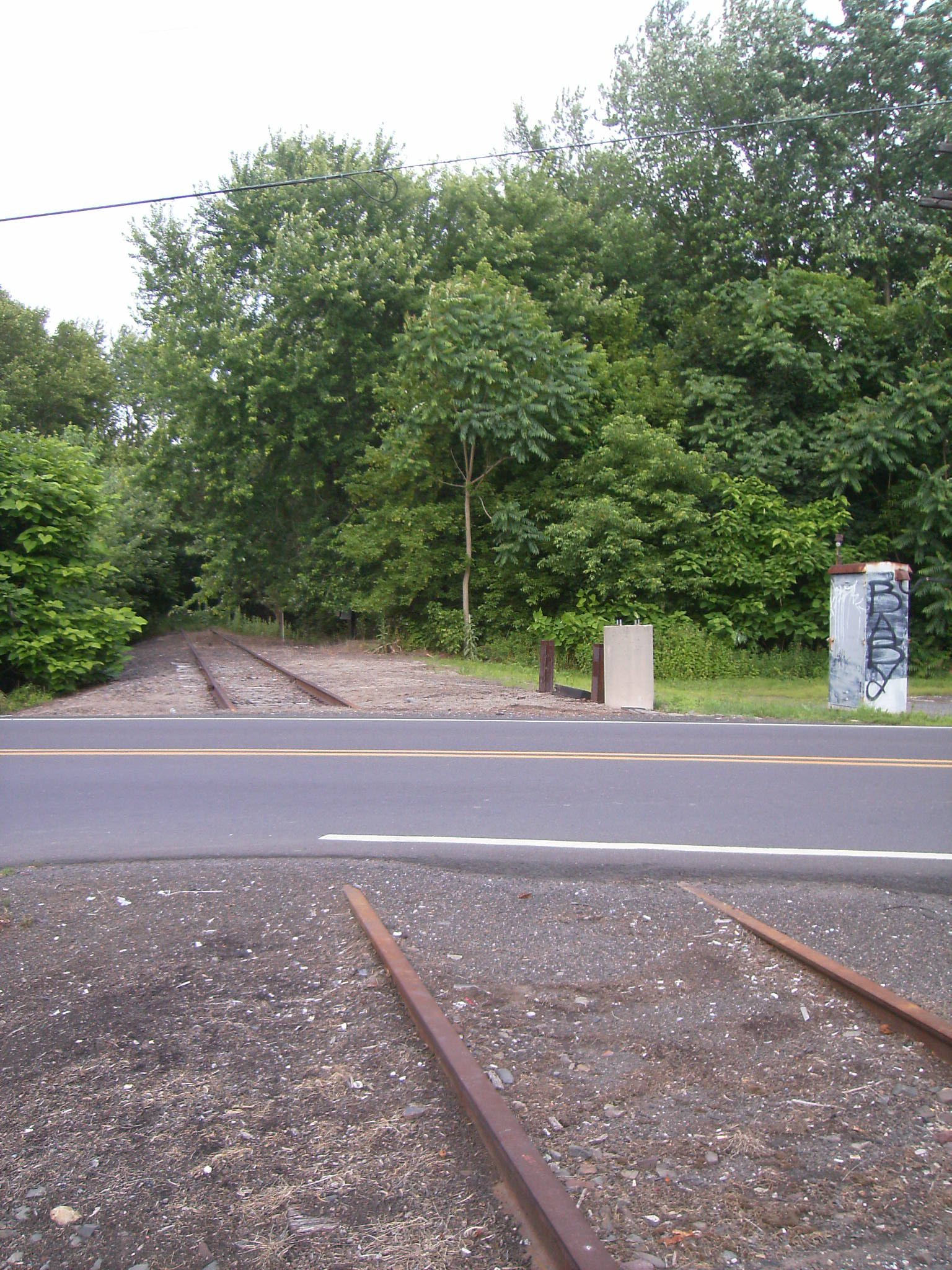

General information
- Location: 830 Holland Road; Holland, Pennsylvania
- Coordinates: 40.1935°N 74.9851°W
- System: Former railroad station
- Owner: SEPTA
- Platforms: 1 side platform
- Tracks: 1

Construction
- Structure type: station shed (demolished)

History
- Closed: January 18, 1983

Former services
Preceding station	SEPTA	Following station
Churchville toward Reading Terminal	Newtown Line	George School toward Newtown
Preceding station	Reading Railroad	Following station
Churchville toward Philadelphia	Newtown Branch	George School toward Newtown
Location

Holland station is a defunct railroad station in Holland, Pennsylvania. Located on Holland Road, it served the Reading Railroad and later SEPTA Regional Rail's Fox Chase/Newtown Line. SEPTA cancelled railroad service in 1983; buses continued to stop at the station in 1999, and the facility was subsequently demolished.

== History ==
Holland station was a stop on the Reading Railroad's Newtown Line. It later became a part of SEPTA's Fox Chase Rapid Transit Line. The station, and all of those north of Fox Chase station, was closed on January 18, 1983, due to failing diesel train equipment.

In addition, a labor dispute began within the SEPTA organization when the transit operator inherited 1,700 displaced employees from Conrail. SEPTA insisted on utilizing transit operators from the Broad Street Subway to operate Fox Chase–Newtown diesel trains, while Conrail requested that railroad engineers run the service. When a federal court ruled that SEPTA had to use Conrail employees in order to offer job assurance, SEPTA cancelled Fox Chase–Newtown trains. Service in the diesel-only territory north of Fox Chase was cancelled at that time, and Holland station still appears in publicly posted tariffs.

Although rail service was initially replaced with a Fox Chase–Newtown shuttle bus, patronage remained light, and the Fox Chase–Newtown shuttle bus service ended on November 30, 1998. SEPTA constructed a metal shelter in the early 1980s shortly before train service ended. The shelter was demolished in the summer of 2000, shortly after bus service was terminated.
