= Van der Gaag Lane =

Road in the Netherlands which was used to block railway construction

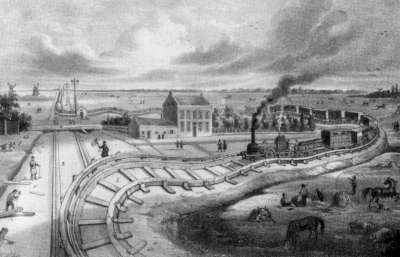
Artist's impression by H.W. Last, in De Nederlandsche Stoompost from June 6th, 1847

Van der Gaag Lane (Dutch: Laantje van Van der Gaag) was a short privately owned road south of Delft in the Netherlands, notable for being the subject of a frog war between property developer A.H.J. van Wickevoort Crommelin and the operator of the Netherlands' first railway, Hollandsche IJzeren Spoorweg-Maatschappij. The lane was purchased from the innkeeper J. van der Gaag in 1845 to serve as a holdout property, whose sole purpose was to block the construction of the Rotterdam-Hague railway in retaliation for the rail operator's refusal to add to the earlier Haarlem-Leiden line a train station that would serve Zandvoort, a town which van Wickevoort Crommelin was intent on promoting as a seaside resort. After a drawn-out expropriation process that took almost two years and failed to acquire the land, the railway company finally completed the line with a sharp bend around Crommelin's road, which served for only five days before the landowner caved to legal pressure and gave the land to the railway company for free.

== Background ==
In 1842, HIJSM began acquiring land for the Haarlem-Leiden Railway, the first railway line in the Netherlands. One parcel of land, located near the town of Zandvoort, was owned by local property developer A.H.J van Wickevoort Crommelin, who agreed to sell it to the railway company provided that they build a station serving the town, which he had plans to develop into a seaside resort. The HIJSM declined his request on the basis that the Haarlem-Leiden Railway was to be an express line with no intermediate stops at all. In light of this, Crommelin agreed to sell the land without the obligation to add a stop, assuming that stagecoaches would continue to serve intermediate points such as Zandvoort in the absence of railway stations.

Much to Crommelin's annoyance, however, when the line opened in August 1842, it had no fewer than five intermediate stops. When queried, the HIJSM responded that upon being given the same ultimatum that Crommelin had offered (land for a reasonable price in return for a station) by multiple different landowners along the line, the company had changed its policy and agreed to build intermediate stops. With residents of intermediate towns now being served by the railway, stagecoach services had ceased, and Zandvoort was left without public transit.

== Land dispute ==
In 1845, after having unsuccessfully petitioned the railway operator to build a station at Zandvoort the previous year, van Wickevoort Crommelin, in collaboration with the Mayor of Zandvoort, devised a scheme to get the station built by sabotaging the HIJSM's next railway project, a line connecting Rotterdam with the Hague. He did this by purchasing a cheap piece of land in the planned path of the railway, and refusing to sell it unless the railway company agreed to build a station at Zandvoort. The land plot in question was a short lane only a few meters wide, bought from local innkeeper J. Van der Gaag for the sum of 200 Dutch Guilders.

Noticing the acquisition of the land, the HIJSM offered Crommelin 100 Dutch Guilders for it, an offer that he refused, stipulating instead that the company could have the land for his purchase price of 200 Dutch Guilders if a station was built at Zandvoort. The Board of Administration initially agreed, drafting a plan to construct the station with a service frequency comparable to other intermediate stops on the line, and to pay compensation of 20,000 guilders if service was ever discontinued.

For unknown reasons, however, executives from the HIJSM jumped the gun on the board's ruling, and began an expropriation process that would see the land acquired from Crommelin without the construction of the Zandvoort station. This process took two years and failed to acquire the land, by which time the railway was almost ready to commence services. The railway's solution was to construct a sharp bend around the disputed property. Five days after this was built, Crommelin, worn down by the legal battle, handed the land to the railway company for free, and the track was realigned in a straight line.
