= Churchville, Pennsylvania =

Unincorporated community in Pennsylvania, US

Churchville
- Census-designated place
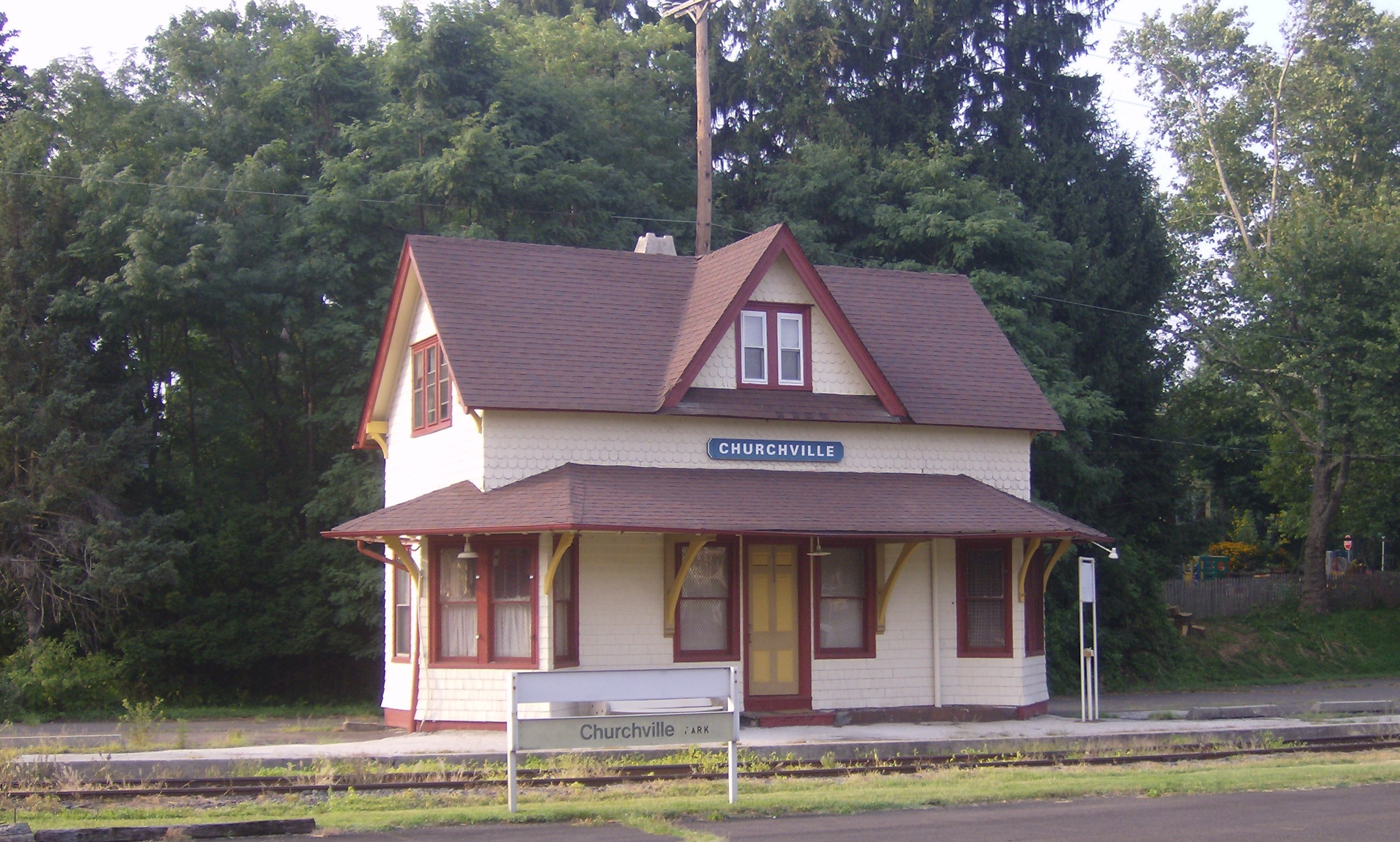
- Former Churchville train station and Post Office. For a time the postmaster lived above the station.

- Location of Churchville in Pennsylvania
- Coordinates: 40°12′03″N 74°59′49″W
- Country: United States
- State: Pennsylvania
- County: Bucks
- Township: Northampton

Area
  - Total: 3.47 sq mi (9.00 km^{2})
  - Land: 3.20 sq mi (8.30 km^{2})
  - Water: 0.27 sq mi (0.71 km^{2})
- Elevation: 203 ft (62 m)

Population (2020)
  - Total: 5,348
  - Density: 1,669.3/sq mi (644.51/km^{2})
- Time zone: UTC-5 (EST)
  - Summer (DST): UTC-4 (EDT)
- Area codes: 215, 267 and 445
- FIPS code: 42-13648

Churchville is a census-designated place (CDP) in Northampton Township, Bucks County, Pennsylvania, United States. The population was 5,348 at the 2020 census.

== Geography ==
According to the U.S. Census Bureau, Churchville has a total area of 2.0 square miles (5.2 km^{2}), of which 0.04 square miles (0.10 km^{2}), or 0.98%, is water.

== Demographics ==
Historical population
Census	Pop.	Note	%±
1990	4,255		—
2000	4,469		5.0%
2010	4,128		−7.6%
2020	5,348		29.6%

As of the 2010 census, Churchville was 95.3% White, 0.5% Black or African American, 2.1% Asian, and 0.8% were two or more races. 1.2% of the population was of Hispanic or Latino ancestry.

As of the census of 2000, there were 4,469 people, 1,370 households, and 1,257 families residing in the CDP. The population density was 2,215.2 inhabitants per square mile (855.3/km^{2}). There were 1,375 housing units at an average density of 681.6 per square mile (263.2/km^{2}). The racial makeup of the CDP was 97.99% White, 0.40% African American, 1.19% Asian, 0.04% from other races, and 0.38% from two or more races. Hispanic or Latino of any race were 0.51% of the population.

There were 1,370 households, out of which 42.8% had children under the age of 18 living with them, 85.9% were married couples living together, 4.3% had a female householder with no husband present, and 8.2% were non-families. 7.2% of all households were made up of individuals, and 3.1% had someone living alone who was 65 years of age or older. The average household size was 3.20 and the average family size was 3.35.

In the CDP, the population was spread out, with 26.2% under the age of 18, 7.7% from 18 to 24, 23.9% from 25 to 44, 32.0% from 45 to 64, and 10.3% who were 65 years of age or older. The median age was 41 years. For every 100 females, there were 95.4 males. For every 100 females age 18 and over, there were 91.9 males.

The median income for a household in the CDP was $95,010, and the median income for a family was $97,114. Males had a median income of $65,550 versus $41,750 for females. The per capita income for the CDP was $32,507. About 1.5% of families and 2.6% of the population were below the poverty line, including 2.1% of those under age 18 and 7.9% of those age 65 or over.

== Passenger trains ==
=== History ===
Churchville's population boom and growth as a commuter haven took place in the mid-1980s, just after the town lost its commuter railway line. Trains served the town until January 14, 1983 via SEPTA's Fox Chase-Newtown Rapid Transit Line. The station, and all of those north of Fox Chase, were closed due to failing diesel train equipment that the then-cash-strapped SEPTA could not afford to rehabilitate. As a result, ridership was low and the service cancelled on a "temporary" basis. As such, Churchville Station still appears in SEPTA's publicly posted tariffs.

Although rail service was initially replaced with a Fox Chase-Newtown shuttle bus, patronage remained light. The traveling public never saw a bus service as a suitable replacement for a rail service, and the Fox Chase-Newtown shuttle bus service ended in 1999.

The Churchville Historic District was added to the National Register of Historic Places in 1995.

=== Resumption of passenger train service ===
In the ensuing years since 1983, there has been heavy interest by both residents and politicians in resuming passenger service to Churchville.

In September 2009, the Southampton-based Pennsylvania Transit Expansion Coalition (PA-TEC) began discussions with township officials along the railway, as well as SEPTA officials, about the realistic possibility of resuming even minimal passenger service to relieve traffic congestion in the region. Plans call for completing the electrification to Newtown, as originally planned in the late 1970s.

PA-TEC's efforts have received overwhelming bipartisan support by both Bucks and Montgomery County officials, as well as at the state level, despite SEPTA's overall reservations. However, SEPTA has also confirmed they are willing to reestablish regular commuter service if strong political support exists in both counties.

== Sights ==
The Churchville Nature Center, operated by the facility of the Bucks County Department of Parks and Recreation, protects 65 acres of wildlife preserve. The center features a visitor center with exhibits, a reptile room, a recreated 1500s Lenape village, a seasonal native butterfly house, gardens and 2 miles of trails.

== Notable person ==
- Jay Wright, former coach of Villanova University men's basketball
