= Olney station (SEPTA) =

SEPTA train station in Philadelphia, Pennsylvania, United States

Coordinates: 40.032954°N 75.123203°W

Olney
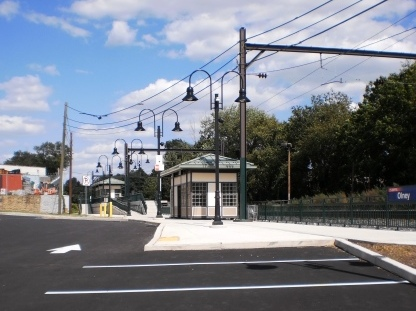
- The parking lot and platform at Olney station on the Fox Chase Line

General information
- Location: Mascher Street and Tabor Road; Philadelphia, Pennsylvania
- Owner: SEPTA
- Line: Fox Chase Branch
- Platforms: 1 side platform
- Tracks: 1
- Connections: SEPTA City Bus: 8

Construction
- Parking: 61 spaces
- Accessible: Yes

Other information
- Fare zone: 1

History
- Opened: February 4, 1878
- Rebuilt: 1906

Services
Preceding station	SEPTA	Following station
Wayne Junction toward Penn Medicine Station	Fox Chase Line	Lawndale toward Fox Chase
Former services
Preceding station	Reading Railroad	Following station
Wayne Junction toward Philadelphia	Newtown Branch	Lawndale toward Newtown
Wayne Junction toward Philadelphia	Frankford Branch	Crescentville toward Frankford
Location

Olney station is a SEPTA Regional Rail station in Philadelphia, Pennsylvania. Located at Mascher Street and Tabor Road in the Olney neighborhood, it serves the Fox Chase Line. The station has a 61-space parking lot. In FY 2013, it had a weekday average of 158 boardings and 156 alightings.

The original station building was constructed in 1906 by the Reading Railroad. It was boarded up in the 1980s, and was demolished in 2008. Olney is the last stop inbound before Wayne Junction, where it merges with the Warminster, West Trenton, Lansdale/Doylestown, and Chestnut Hill East lines.
