= Newtown Junction =

Rail junction in Pennsylvania, US

Coordinates: 40.0332°N 75.1410°W

Newtown Junction is a rail junction in North Philadelphia, Pennsylvania, where the Newtown Branch joins the SEPTA Main Line. The Warminster Line, West Trenton Line, and Lansdale/Doylestown Line all continue north toward Fern Rock along the old Reading trunk while the Fox Chase Line heads east toward Olney. North of Fox Chase, the line crossed over the West Trenton Line between the Meadowbrook and Bethayres stations and had its terminus in Newtown, hence the name Newtown Junction. Until 1983, SEPTA ran diesel train service past Fox Chase to Newtown after taking over line operations from Conrail. However, the branch, single-tracked north of Fox Chase, was never electrified, and service was "temporarily" suspended in January 1983.
