= Charles Lombaert =

American contracting engineer

Charles Lombaert (May 18, 1790 – April 13, 1875) was an American contracting engineer notable for being a superintendent for the Philadelphia, Wilmington and Baltimore Railroad, which in 1838 completed the first rail link between the three cities.

== Biography ==
Lombaert was born on May 18, 1790, in Philadelphia. On March 14, 1812, he married Anna Arndt in Easton, Pennsylvania. Anna was a granddaughter of Major Jacob Arndt, who had fought in the French and Indian Wars and served on Pennsylvania's Committee of Safety and Correspondence during the American Revolution. Her parents were Elizabeth Ihrie and Captain John Arndt, who served the Pennsylvania unit of the Continental Army's Flying Camp militia.

In 1833, Lombaert was elected one of the 12 managers of the Philadelphia and Trenton Railroad, which began operations the following year. On May 1, 1834, Lombaert sold 16 horses and harnesses to the P&T and, as the company's agent, began to operate the line with horse-drawn cars. Meanwhile, he negotiated a contract with the People's Line of steamboats to carry P&T passengers, which the railroad's officials approved on June 23. On Sept. 1, 1834, he was appointed the railroad's superintendent. The P&T would eventually become part of the Pennsylvania Railroad system. Today, part of the P&T main line is part of Amtrak's Northeast Corridor.

In 1836, the Pennsylvania State Legislature appointed Lombaert one of several dozen commissioners to build the Bristol and Newtown Railroad from Bristol, Pennsylvania, to Newtown, Pennsylvania. In 1838, Lombaert was one of three superintendents of construction for the PW&B, which had merged with three other railroads to create the first rail link from Philadelphia to Baltimore. (This main line survives today as part of Amtrak's Northeast Corridor.) The railroad laid him off the following year as an "economy measure", but still noted his service on the 1839 Newkirk Viaduct Monument in Philadelphia. In 1840, Lombaert received a patent for machinery to clear snow from railroad tracks.

Lombaert died on April 13, 1875, in Lambertville, New Jersey.

== Family ==
Charles and Anna had 11 children. One son, Herman J. Lombaert, would become assistant PRR superintendent under Herman Haupt and ultimately a PRR vice president. Their daughter Anna married Samuel H. Kneass on March 14, 1837, at Morrisville, Pennsylvania. Kneass was a civil engineer and architect who had performed the survey for the P&T line and was at the time helping to complete the PW&B line by engineering the Newkirk Viaduct over the Schuylkill River in present-day Philadelphia.
