= Churchville Nature Center =

Nature center in Pennsylvania, United States

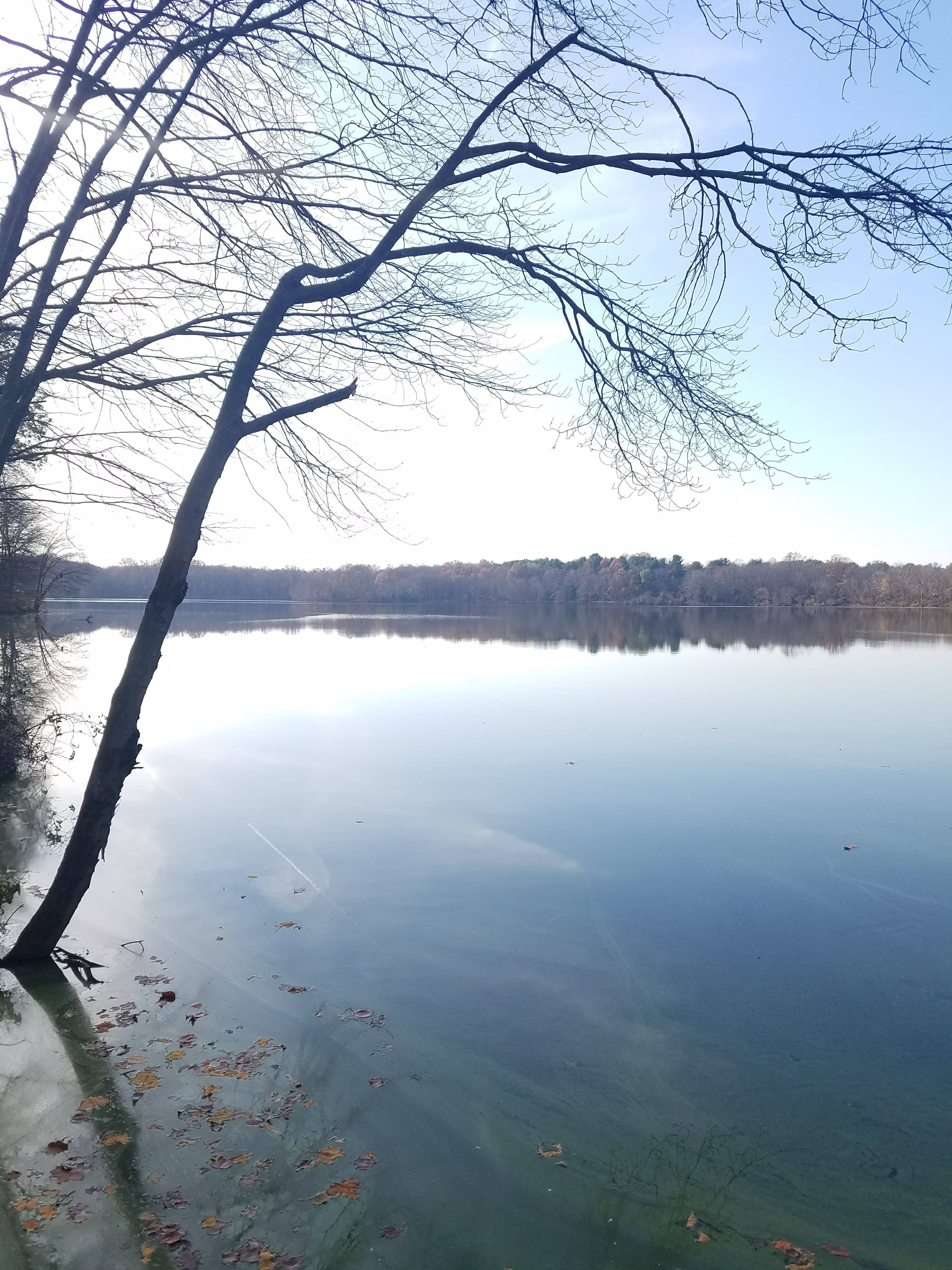
- Churchville Reservoir in mid-November

- Location within Pennsylvania Location within the United States
- Interactive map of Churchville Nature Center
- Location: 501 Churchville Lane, Churchville, Pennsylvania, U.S.
- Coordinates: 40.1860°N 74.9929°W
- Area: 55 acres (22 ha)
- Created: 1964
- Operator: Bucks County Parks & Recreation
- Website: Official website

Churchville Nature Center is a facility of the Bucks County, Pennsylvania Department of Parks and Recreation and is located in Churchville, Pennsylvania. The center focuses on environmental education, public outreach and the preservation of native wildlife through its wide range of programs, projects and surveys. The nature center offers educational programing year round through its Environmental Education and Lenape Village departments. The center features a native butterfly house and covers 55 acres of wildlife preserve.

While the facility and property are owned by the County of Bucks, much of the public and environmental outreach of the center is supported by the non-profit Friends of Churchville Nature Center.

== History ==
In 1942 Mill Creek, a tributary of the larger Neshaminy Creek, was dammed up by the Philadelphia Suburban Water Company creating Springfield Lake (now called Churchville Reservoir) as a reserve source for the local municipal water supply. In 1964 after years of development and the creation of the Department of Parks and Recreation, Philadelphia Suburban and Bucks County struck a deal that leased land adjacent to the lake to the county to found Churchville Nature Center. The facility was the first nature center in the county and originally operated out of a small 1800s stone farmhouse. Today the farmhouse is still standing and currently used for offices.

In 1976 the nature center moved out of the old farmhouse and into what is now the old wing of the now greatly expanded visitor center. This first version of the visitor center had a small area for offices, an auditorium, a gift shop, a visitor desk, library and several exhibits. As the center grew, it took on more staff and expanded both its programming and exhibits to keep up with the influx of new visitors. In the 1990s the center expanded to include two of its current major attractions: the Lenape Village and the Marlin D. Corn Wildlife Gardens.

In 2005 the Nature Center started a sustainable, eco-friendly expansion to its main visitor center that took ten years and over $3 million to complete. Spearheaded by now retired Director Chris Stieber, the expansion added over 5,000 square feet of space, 32 geothermal wells, a cooling tower, a 20,000 gallon underground rainwater collecting cistern, a working wetlab, classrooms, an exhibit hall and new auditorium.

== Mission and symbol ==
The mission of the Center is to instill an awareness and appreciation of the natural world through education, and to encourage responsible environmental stewardship with a commitment to the preservation of resources and wildlife habitat.

Churchville chose a symbol representing one of the more widely distributed animals found on its grounds, the dragonfly.

== Trails ==
Churchville Nature Center contains about two miles of color blazed trails that weave through 55 acres of the main preserve. These wildlife trails are open to the public from dawn till dusk. Because the site is a nature preserve, dogs are not allowed on trails and the lake is not open to fishing, boating or related activities. The trail includes sections that are paved and boardwalk sections made using recycled plastic, making those trails ADA compatible.

== Visitor Center ==
The current visitor center is the combination of the building built to replace the original farmhouse back in 1973 and the green building expansion finished in 2014. The building houses a library, educational exhibits, an exhibition hall, offices, a reptile room, classrooms and an auditorium.

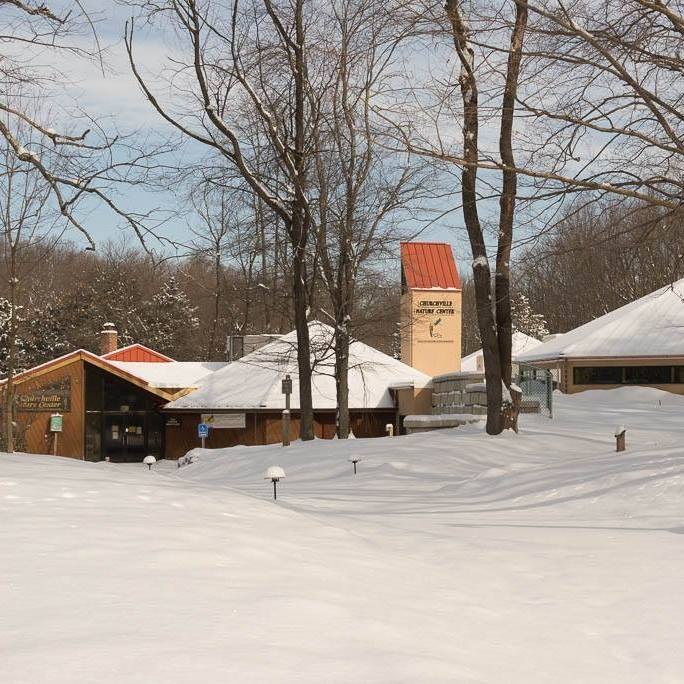
The Churchville Nature Center Visitor Center during winter

=== Wetlab and Reptile Room ===
Open to the public during Sunday mornings and special events, the Wet Lab/Reptile Room at Churchville Nature Center houses the center's live educational animals and equipment used for water quality testing in the Churchville Greenway. Part of the collection is accessed by the public just outside the room and includes snakes, lizards and the center's invertebrate collection. The collection is funded by public programming and donations, while animal care is done by a collection of volunteers.

=== Lester S. Thomas Library ===
Located past the visitor desk, the Lester S. Thomas Library houses the center's book collection, past count records, an antique fireplace and a wide view of the Tony Di Mattio Bird Gardens. The library was dedicated in 1971 in honor of the first chairman of the Churchville Preserve Advisory Committee.

=== Marlin D. Corn Wildlife Gardens ===
Named after their lead designer, former naturalist Marlin Corn, the Marlin D. Corn Wildlife Gardens were created in 1994 as a collection of interconnected microcosms showcasing the different habitats and native plants of Bucks County. They are a popular attraction and wedding spot on the preserve.

=== Bird Blind ===
Located behind the visitor center, Churchville's bird blind gives visitors a hidden view of the Tony Di Mattio Bird Gardens. The gardens house two ponds connected by a small stream and a variety of bird feeders. The bird gardens are also visible from the visitor center library.

== Education ==
The nature center holds public, school and scout programs year round through their Environmental Education Department. Programs include nighttime campfires, nature walks, live animal demonstrations, children's clubs, and festivals such as the annual Rock & Mineral Expo. The nature center also offers naturalist programs, talks, courses, workshops and trips geared towards adults and families alike.

=== Summer camps ===
From June through August the nature center offers hands-on, educational summer camps with a different topic each week. Camps are broken down into three age groups for ages 4–13 and operate with the option for half or full day stays for the two younger groups.

== Lenape Village ==
A centerpiece attraction, the Lenape Village is a working re-creation of a 1500s pre-Columbian settlement of the Lenni Lenape, a Native American people who occupied the modern Delaware Valley and New York Metropolitan Area in Pre-Columbian America. The village hosts school programs and runs Sunday walks during part of the year as well as several special events including the "Tah-Ko-King" Harvest Festival.

== The Butterfly House at Churchville ==
=== Beginnings ===
The Janet V. Machiewitz Butterfly House opened in July 2014 after several years of in-house construction by a team of volunteers under the direction of then Director Chris Stieber and lead Volunteer George Belfield. The house was designed to showcase the different species of butterflies native to Pennsylvania in an effort to promote awareness and appreciation for pollinators and their overall conservation needs. The house rears butterflies onsite and maintains an ever-changing internal and external series of gardens that promote both native butterfly host and feeder plants. Working as both an exhibit and conservation effort, the center actively uses the butterfly house grounds as an area to plant currently uncommon or rare host plants native to the area in an effort to attract equally as uncommon butterflies. A grove of common pawpaw and several common hoptree were planted in the butterfly house enclosure back when the structure was being built to attract the zebra swallowtail and giant swallowtail to the Churchville area.

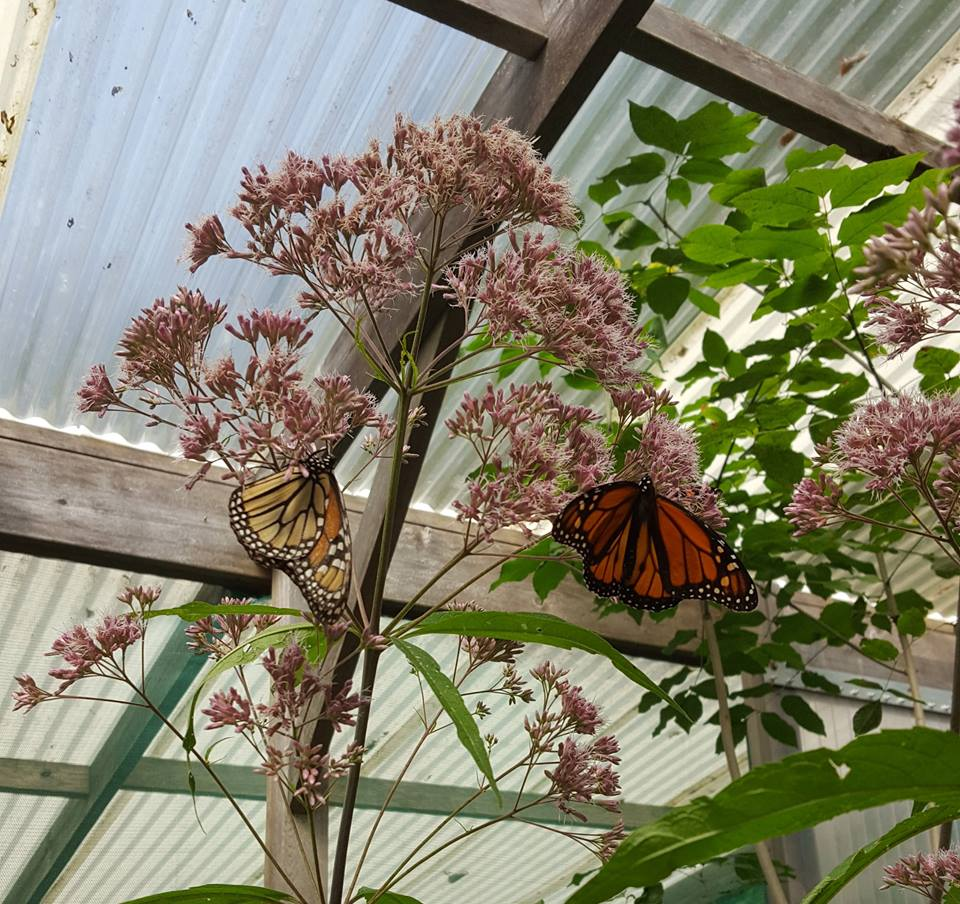
Two Monarch butterflies feeding inside of the Butterfly House at Churchville. August 2017

=== Programs ===
The house is a paid exhibit that currently runs from mid-June through mid-September each year for educational tours. These tours are conducted by a group of volunteer docents who dedicate their time to rear, garden and educate within the butterfly house. Several special events are help each year connected to the butterfly house including Arthropalooza, an all invertebrate related two-day festival, and the annual Monarch Tag & Release Party. The tagging event, held each year since the house was opened, allows the public to take part in the annual Monarch butterfly migration to central Mexico and subsequent research conducted on their threatened population. Since 2017, all Monarchs released during the event are reared in house to increase the conservation benefits of the program.

== Wildlife ==
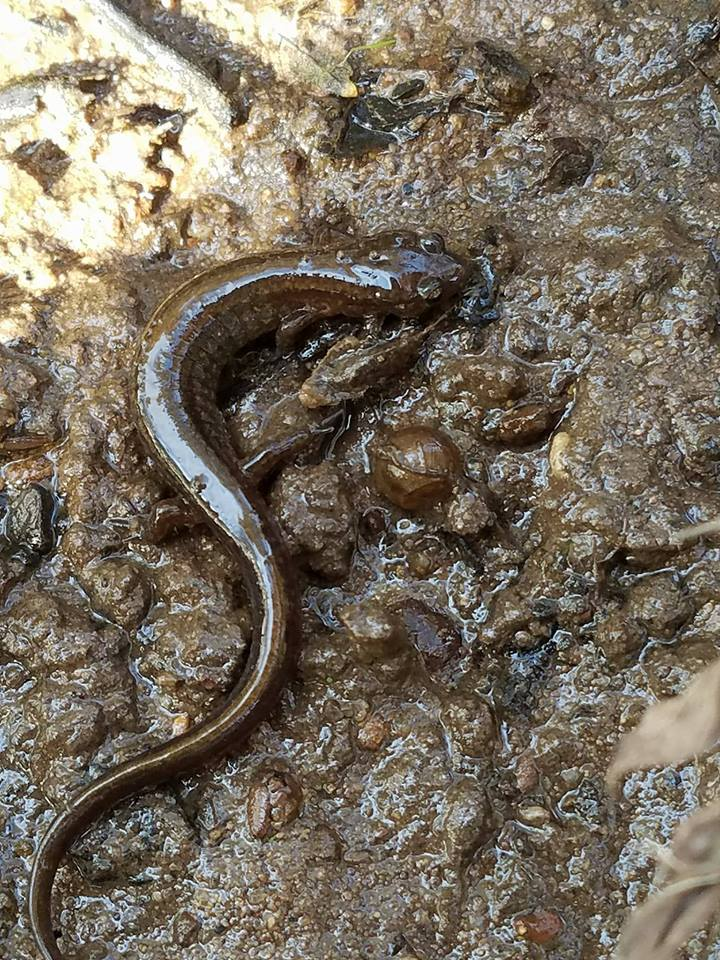
Northern Dusky Salamander found along the Ironworks Creek in Bucks County, Pennsylvania

With the Churchville Reservoir being an important migratory bird flyover site in eastern Pennsylvania, Churchville Nature Center participates in a variety of studies, both local and national, that look at avian diversity and densities. One count is the National Audubon Society's annual Christmas Bird Count which provides researchers data on winter bird populations across North America. Churchville also holds its own Migratory Bird Marathon during each spring migration period and has kept weekly records of its Saturday morning bird walks since the late 1990s to record population patterns on the property.

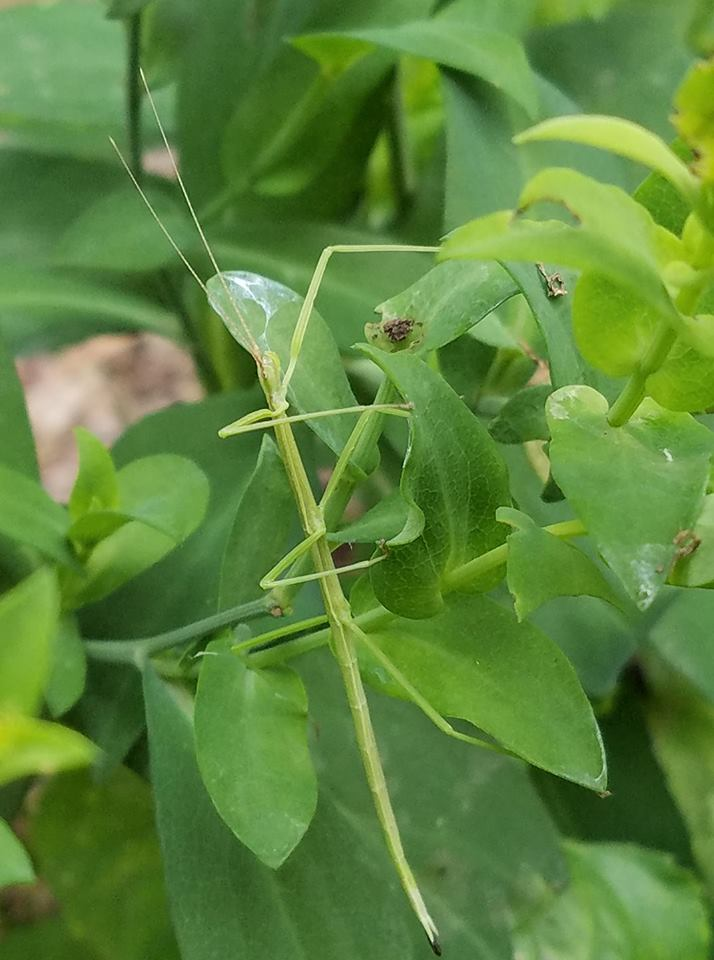
A common walking stick (Diapheromera femorata) found inside Churchville Nature Center's Butterfly House

Other surveys the nature center participates in are the North American Butterfly Association's (NABA) July 4 Butterfly Count and the Herpetological Inventory of Bucks County. The center coordinates the Lower Bucks County circle for NABA which provides researchers data on the population trends of North American Lepidoptera. The Herpetological Survey was a study conducted in the early 2000s that culminated in an updated publication showing the presence of 44 species of reptile and amphibian currently in Bucks County.
