= Churchville Historic District =

Historic district in Pennsylvania, United States

- U.S. National Register of Historic Places
- U.S. Historic district
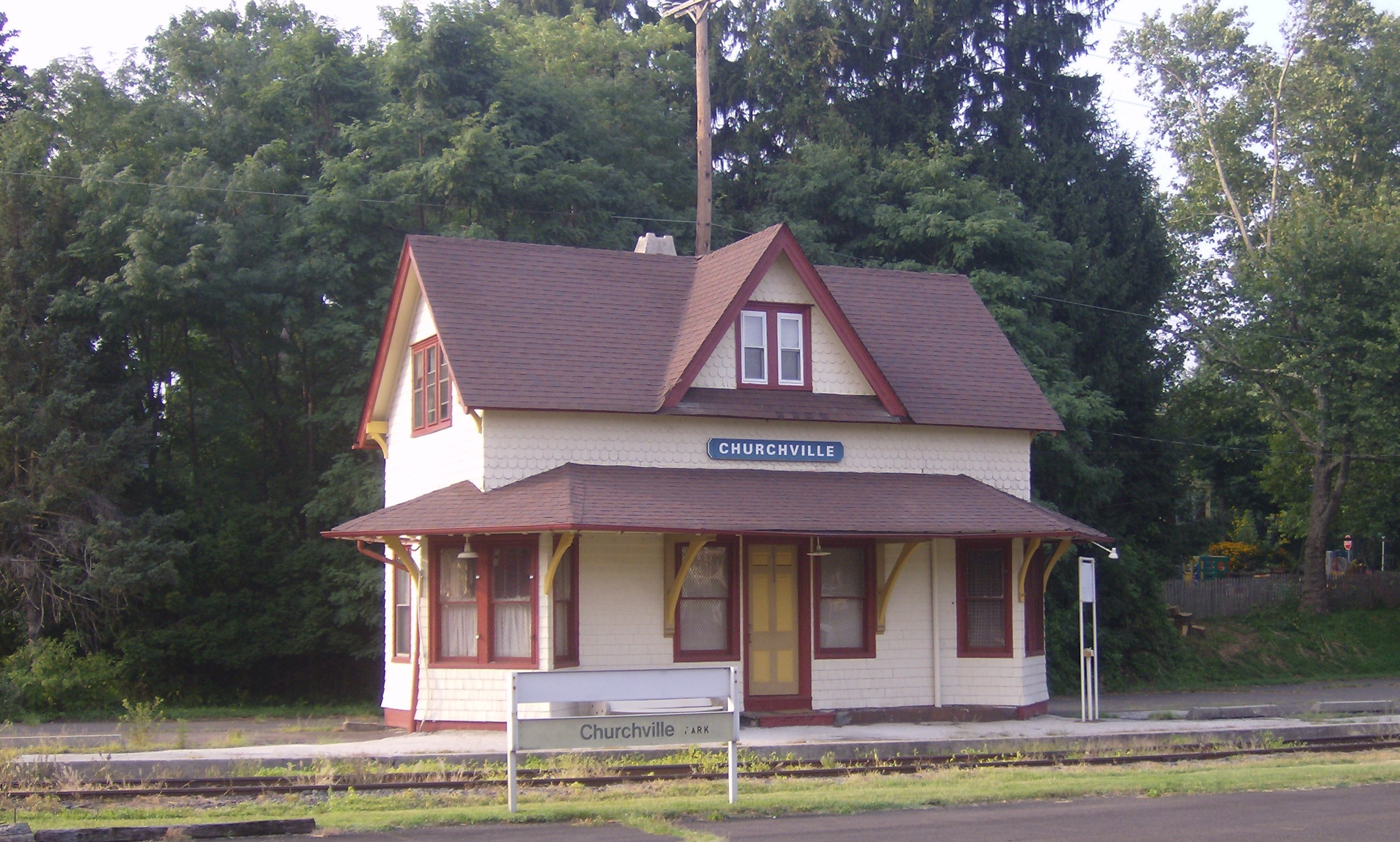
- Churchville Station, Churchville Historic District, August 2006

- Location within Pennsylvania Location within the United States
- Location: Roughly, along Bristol Rd., Bustleton Pike and Cornell and Knowles Aves., Northampton and Upper Southampton Townships, Churchville, Pennsylvania
- Coordinates: 40°10′56″N 75°00′49″W
- Area: 185 acres (75 ha)
- Built: 1784
- Architectural style: Gothic Revival, Bungalow/craftsman
- NRHP reference No.: 95000887
- Added to NRHP: July 21, 1995

Churchville Historic District is a national historic district located in Churchville, Northampton Township and Upper Southampton Township in Bucks County, Pennsylvania, USA. The district includes 140 contributing buildings, seven contributing structures and one contributing object in the crossroads village of Churchville. They include a variety of residential, commercial and institutional buildings and notable examples of Gothic Revival and Bungalow/craftsman architecture. Notable buildings include the John Hillings House (c. 1812), North and Southampton Dutch Reformed Church (1816), Churchville Train Station (1891), general store (1883), Studebaker and Willys car dealership (1920s), and Churchville Telephone Exchange (1900).

It was added to the National Register of Historic Places in 1995.
