= National Railway =

Planned American railroad

Map of the Delaware and Bound Brook Railroad

The National Railway or National Air Line Railroad was a planned air-line railroad between New York City and Washington, D.C. in the United States around 1870. Part of it was eventually built from New York City to Philadelphia by the Delaware and Bound Brook Railroad and the Delaware River Branch of the North Pennsylvania Railroad, leased by the Philadelphia and Reading Railway, in 1879, and becoming its New York Branch. The line was intended to provide an alternate to the various monopolies that existed along the route, specifically the United New Jersey Railroad and Canal Companies and their Camden and Amboy Railroad, and as such had a long struggle to be built.

== History ==
=== Planning ===
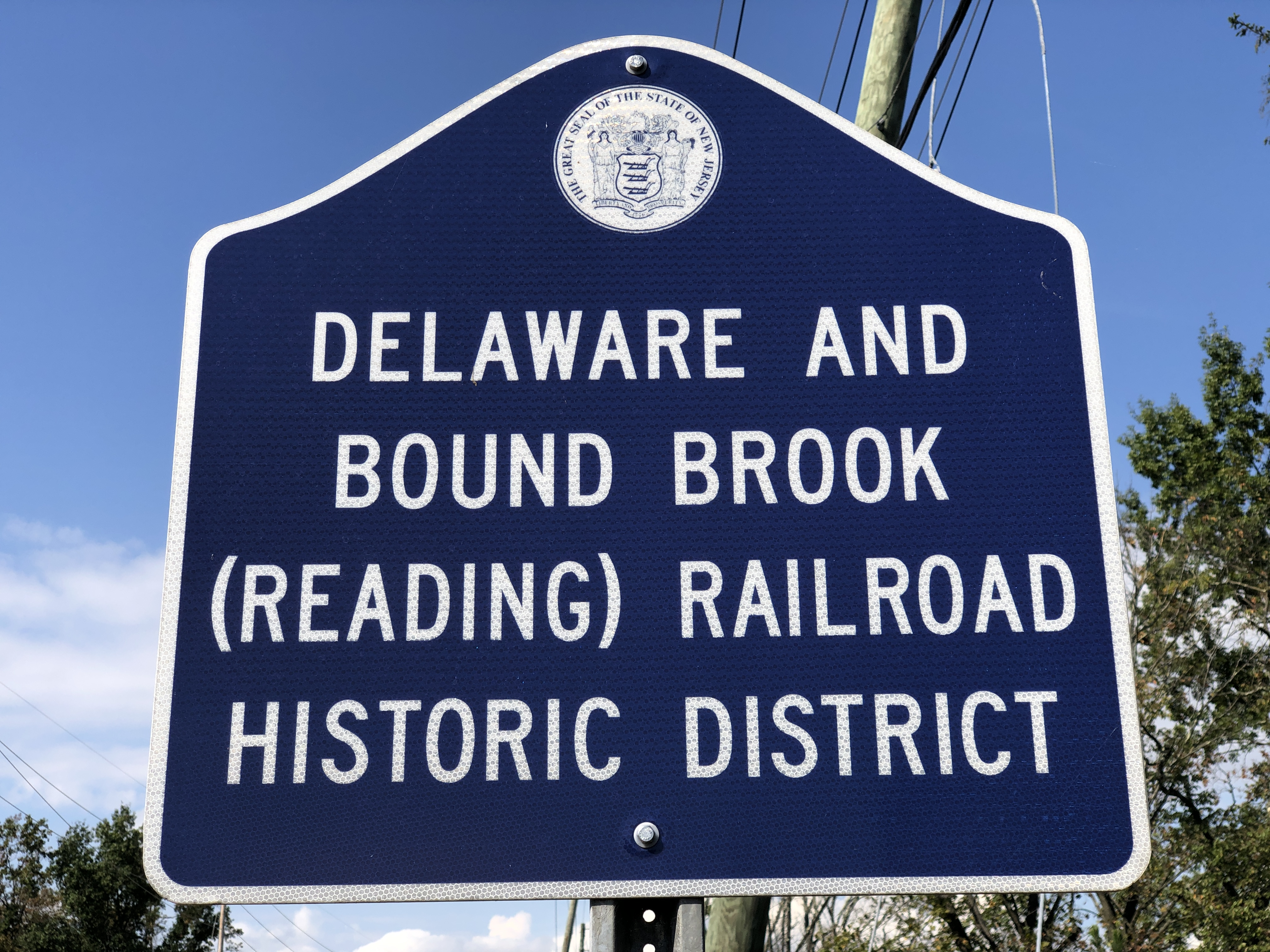
Historical marker for the railroad

In the spring of 1867, Henry Martyn Hamilton began planning to construct a line between New York City and Philadelphia to compete with the United Companies by getting short lines chartered that would end-to-end form the complete route. The first two sections were chartered in New Jersey as the Hamilton Land Improvement Company and Millstone and Trenton Railroad on April 3, 1867, forming half of the New Jersey route, without the knowledge of the United Companies. The Millstone and Trenton Railroad was authorized to build a line from Trenton northeast to Millstone, and the Hamilton Land Improvement Company could build six miles anywhere in the state, which was enough to bridge the gap from Millstone to the Central Railroad of New Jersey at Bound Brook.

On March 22, 1867, the Elizabeth and New Providence Railroad was incorporated in New Jersey to be a part of the New York City to Philadelphia line. The Millstone and Trenton Railroad was organized on November 27, 1867. The stockholders of the railroad agreed to transfer their stock to Hamilton if he could obtain a guarantee from the Pennsylvania Railroad, the Reading Railroad, the Central Railroad of New Jersey, the Philadelphia, Wilmington, and Baltimore Railroad, or the Pittsburgh, Fort Wayne and Chicago Railway that the line could be finished in the time provided by its charter.

The first official proposals for the railway came in 1868 at the federal level, with bills in the U.S. House of Representatives for a line between New York and Washington via Easton, Reading and Lancaster. Later proposals concentrated on the New York City to Philadelphia section, and were made both at the federal level and in the states of Pennsylvania and New Jersey.

On September 21, 1868, the Attleborough Railroad, a short branch line chartered April 15, 1856 in Bucks County, Pennsylvania, was taken over by Hamilton and renamed to the National Railway, to be part of the through line. On November 11, 1868, Hamilton was elected President of the Millstone and Trenton Railroad, with control going directly to the National Railway. The project was first publicized in December of that year.

On January 1, 1869, the Camden and Amboy Rail Road's (C&A) legislated monopoly over New York-Philadelphia railroads in New Jersey expired. However, the C&A continued to lobby legislators and fight through the courts to prevent the National Railway from being built. On September 17, 1869, the National Railway was incorporated in Pennsylvania to serve as a portion of the New Line. On September 28, 1869, Hamilton transferred the stock of the Millstone and Trenton Railroad to the National Railway Company. Hamilton completed the series of railroad charters he needed to compete with the Camden and Amboy Railroad. In 1870, various bills in New Jersey to allow consolidation of short lines into the Millstone and Trenton Railroad failed.

In early 1871, the National Railway bill was introduced once again in the U.S. House, this time by John W. Garrett, president of the Baltimore and Ohio Railroad, who feared the Pennsylvania Railroad's (PRR) proposed lease of the United Companies. It was again defeated. The PRR gained control of the United Companies on May 15, 1871.

On March 30, 1871, the German Valley Railroad was chartered in New Jersey, including a Trojan Horse for the National Railway. The governor refused to sign the bill, but the company organized anyway. The same strategy was used on March 19, 1872 with the passage of the Stanhope Railroad. The state clerks were bribed to keep the Trojan Horse off the debated version but include it in the signed version. This was soon discovered, and on August 12 the National Railway was sued for fraud. On February 2, 1873, the New Jersey Court of Chancery ruled that the National Railway had no rights to build in New Jersey.

On January 11, 1873, the Excelsior Enterprise Company, a holding company incorporated on May 24, 1871, was renamed the National Company, acquiring the National Railway of Pennsylvania (the original Attleborough Railroad) on January 15. The National Railway gained control of the Stanhope Railroad on January 18, but that soon proved worthless.

On March 19, 1873, the New Jersey House of Representatives killed the PRR's opposition bill to create a New Jersey Railway on the land chosen for the National Railway. The PRR and National Railway agreed at that time to support a general incorporation law to break the stalemate, which had been blocked since the 1840s by the Camden and Amboy. That law was passed on April 2, and on April 8 the PRR's company was chartered, running mostly within 100 yards of the planned National Railway. The National Railway of New Jersey was chartered soon after on April 17, as a supplement to the New York and Philadelphia Railroad, chartered 40 minutes after the general incorporation law was passed. Investors were initially scared off from the project, placed under contract on May 31, due to the various scandals involved.

=== Incorporation of the Delaware and Bound Brook Railroad ===
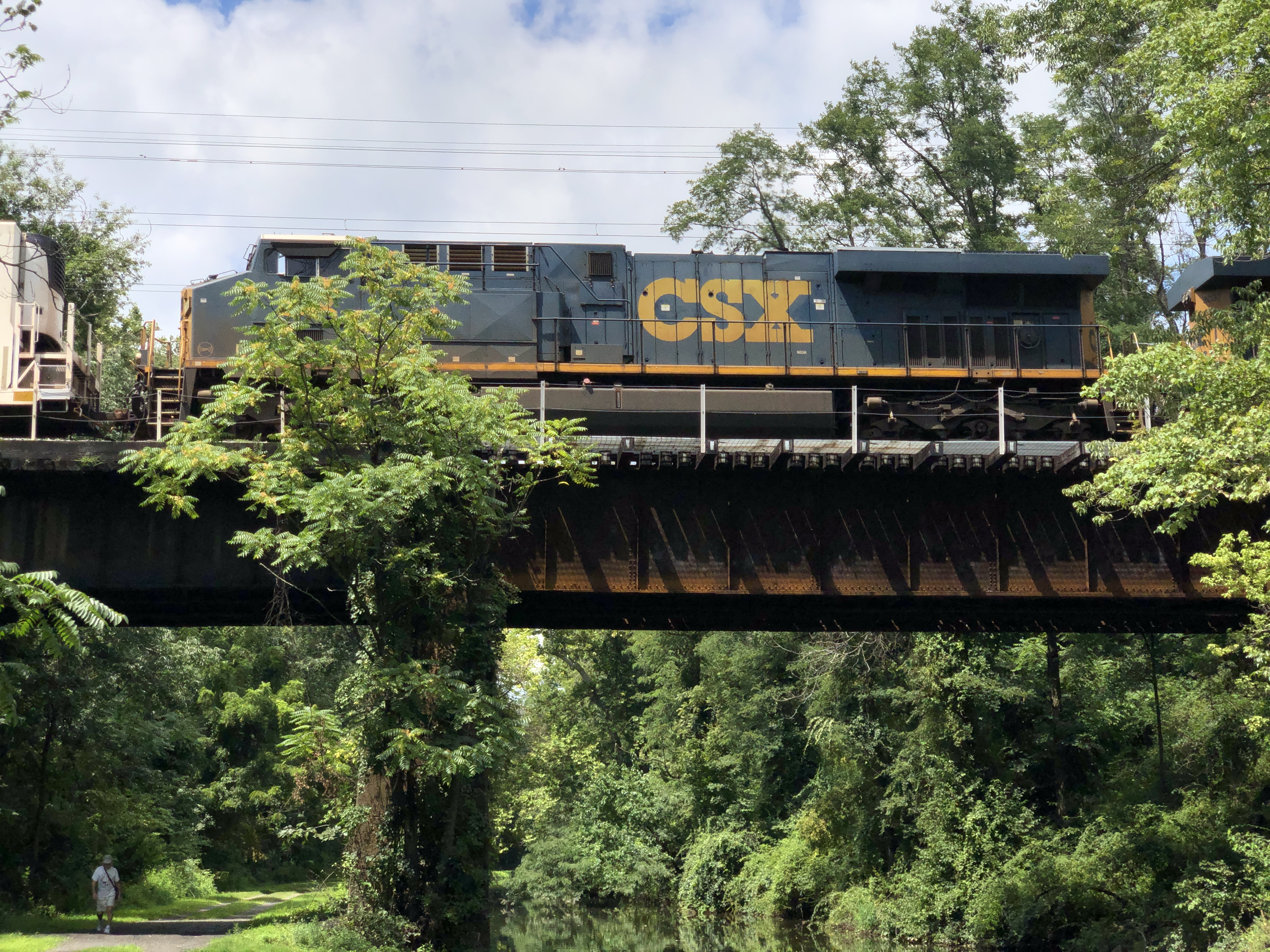
A CSX Transportation train crossing the Delaware and Bound Brook Railroad over the Delaware and Raritan Canal in Ewing Township, New Jersey, in August 2023

The Delaware and Bound Brook Railroad was incorporated in New Jersey on May 12, 1874, to build a railroad from the Delaware River to the Central Railroad of New Jersey (CNJ) at Bound Brook, along the National Railway's surveyed path. At that time, the North Pennsylvania Railroad took over the National Railway project from Hamilton. On May 14, the North Pennsylvania approved the construction of the Delaware River Branch, splitting from the main line at Jenkintown and running to the Delaware River at Yardley. On May 16, the property of the National Railway was deeded to the D&BB, including the Stanhope Railroad and the National Company.

The Delaware and Bound Brook Railroad (D&BB) and Delaware River Branch opened on May 1, 1876, from the North Pennsylvania Railroad to the CNJ. The D&BB had trackage rights over the CNJ to their Jersey City terminal. Passenger service between Jersey City and Philadelphia begins, competing with the PRR. The fare is set at $2.65, ten cents lower than the PRR. The PRR responded by cutting its excursion fare between New York and Philadelphia to $2.65, and a two-day round-trip fare to $5. The Trenton Branch of the D&BB opened in 1877.

The original plans carried the National Railway northeast and east past Bound Brook, running north of the CNJ and crossing the New Jersey Rail Road at Waverly to the CNJ terminal. In Pennsylvania, the original plan was southeast of what was built, running directly to the north end of the Junction Railroad in Philadelphia. Part of this route was built as the New York Short Line, connecting the original Delaware River Branch at Oakford southwest to the Reading Company's Philadelphia, Newtown and New York Railroad (PN&NY) at Cheltenham Township. This line was completed in 1906.

The Philadelphia and Reading Railway leased the North Pennsylvania Railroad, including the D&BB, on May 14, 1879, obtaining control of two-thirds of the Bound Brook Route. The National Company's charter was later used to form the Reading Company, a holding company for the Reading Company.

The East Trenton Railroad incorporated in 1884, was taken over by the D&BB as a branch in the Trenton area. The Trenton, Lawrenceville and Princeton Railroad, an interurban streetcar line, was taken over at some point as a branch of the East Trenton Railroad for freight. The Port Reading Railroad, opened in 1892, also served as a spur of the D&BB, running to Port Reading on the Arthur Kill.

=== Challenges ===
The United Companies received a charter for the Mercer and Somerset Railway in New Jersey on March 17, 1870 solely to provide a challenge to the planned competitor railroad known as the National Railway. Track began to be laid on January 20, 1871 at the crossing of the National Railway survey in Hopewell. A frog war resulted in January 1876 at the crossing point; a war that was won by the National Railway, thus rendering the Mercer and Somerset Railway redundant and useless. On January 21, 1880, the Mercer and Somerset Railway was abandoned, having become useless.

On October 22, 1873, the PRR leased the Philadelphia, Newtown & New York Railroad, a railroad chartered on November 21, 1860, with the intention to block the National Railway. The line opened as a branch of the Connecting Railroad from Fox Chase to Newtown on February 2, 1878, with the operation of two excursion trains. Revenue service began on February 4.

On November 22, 1879, the North Pennsylvania Railroad began operating it, as it was no longer of use to the PRR. Service was rerouted from the PRR's West Philadelphia station to the Philadelphia and Reading Railway's station at 3rd Street and Berks Street. Another challenge was raised as to whether the company could build a bridge over the Delaware River.
