= Chestnut Street Bridge (Philadelphia) =

Bridge in Pennsylvania, United States

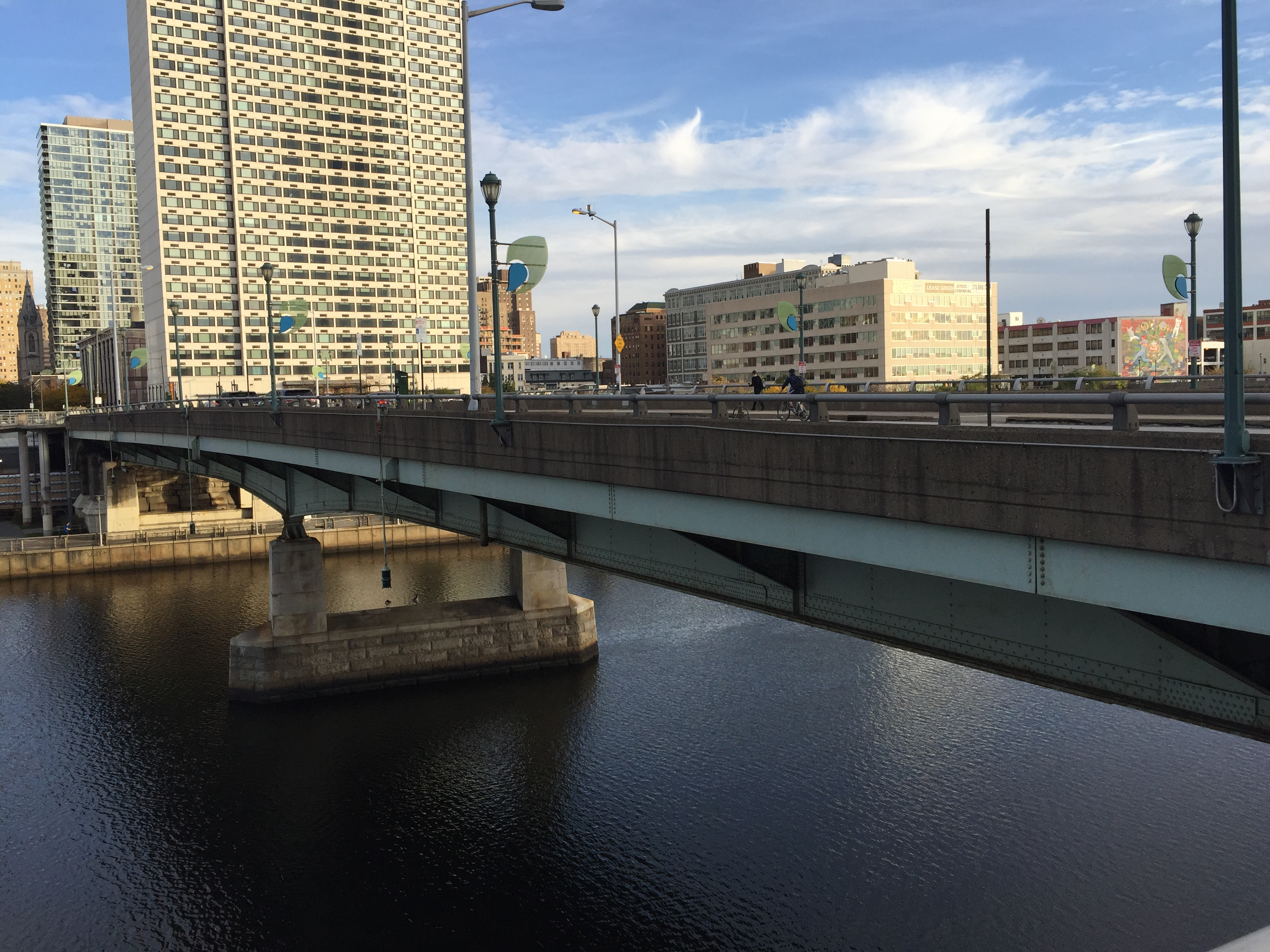
- Chestnut Street Bridge across the Schuylkill River, looking east, in 2017
- Coordinates: 39°57′11″N 75°10′52″W
- Carries: Chestnut Street
- Crosses: Schuylkill River; Schuylkill Expressway
- ID number: 670003009022930

Characteristics
- Design: Steel continuous, Girder and Floorbeam System
- Total length: 113.1 metres (371 ft)
- Width: 13.5 metres (44 ft) (roadway)
- Load limit: 65.7 t (72.4 short tons)
- Clearance below: 8.2 metres (27 ft)

History
- Opened: 1957

Statistics
- Daily traffic: 16109 (2006)

Location
- Interactive map of Chestnut Street Bridge

The Chestnut Street Bridge is a bridge across the Schuylkill River that carries Chestnut Street in Philadelphia, Pennsylvania. The original 1861 bridge was "a bridge whose scale and use of cast iron made it singular in the United States and throughout the world". The 1957 bridge, now one way, helps connect West Philadelphia with the rest of the city.

== History ==
Construction of the first Chestnut Street Bridge, designed by Strickland Kneass, started on 4 September 1861. That bridge cost $500,000, was 1,528 feet (466 m) long, and was constructed of cast iron, with approaches and piers of granite. When the bridge formally opened on 23 June 1866, it was the second connection between Center City, Philadelphia and West Philadelphia, after the Market Street Bridge.

In 1957, to make way for the Schuylkill Expressway, the western pier of the bridge was removed, and the main spans of the bridge were replaced.

In 2011, a weight restriction was placed on it due to its age.

In August 2019, the bridge was closed to vehicles and pedestrians for one year to repair the steel superstructure and replace the deck, but was extended to March 19, 2022 due to COVID-19.

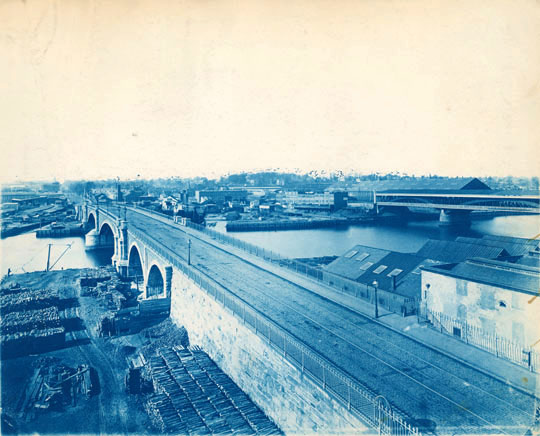
Chestnut Street Bridge 1869

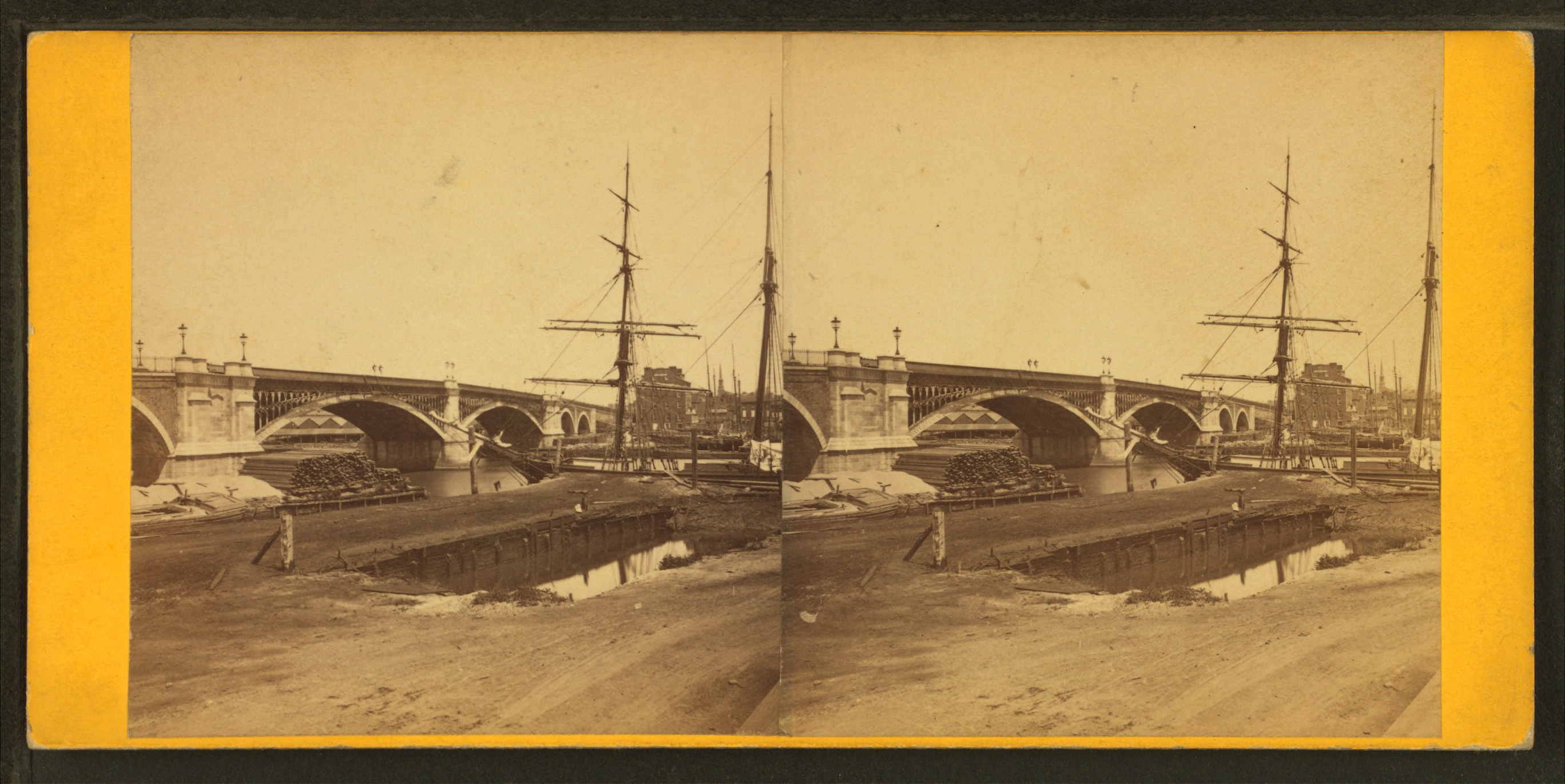
Stereo image pair of the Chestnut Street Bridge c. 1865-1907

== In film ==
- In the 2007 film Shooter, FBI agent Nick Memphis (played by Michael Peña) is abducted while walking across the Chestnut Street Bridge.
- One episode of Hack was filmed on the bridge.

== See also ==
- List of crossings of the Schuylkill River
