= Strickland Landis Kneass =

Strickland Landis Kneass (July 29, 1821, in Philadelphia - January 14, 1884, in Philadelphia) was an American civil engineer, municipal surveyor, and railroad president.

Kneass's father, William Kneass, was for many years engraver of the U.S. Mint. His older brother was civil engineer and architect Samuel Honeyman Kneass. The younger Kneass attended Rensselaer Institute, where he graduated in 1839 at the age of 18 with highest honors.

After graduation, Kneass "held various surveying and engineering jobs, including the post of Principal Assistant Engineer for the Pennsylvania Railroad. He helped conduct the preliminary surveys, and supervised construction of a section of the line, including several bridges and the Tussy Mountain Tunnel," wrote Adam Levine, a historical consultant for the Philadelphia Water Department.

From 1855 until 1872, Kneass was chief engineer and surveyor of the consolidated city of Philadelphia. Among other things, he "re-designed Philadelphia's drainage system, designed new bridges to cross the Schuylkill River, and set up the extension of the City's streetcar system," according to the Athenaeum of Philadelphia. His most notable work is Philadelphia's 1866 cast-iron Chestnut Street Bridge.

In 1872, he became assistant to the president of the Pennsylvania Railroad. In 1880, Kneass became president of the Pennsylvania and Delaware and other railroads.
