= Frog war =

Disputes between railroad companies

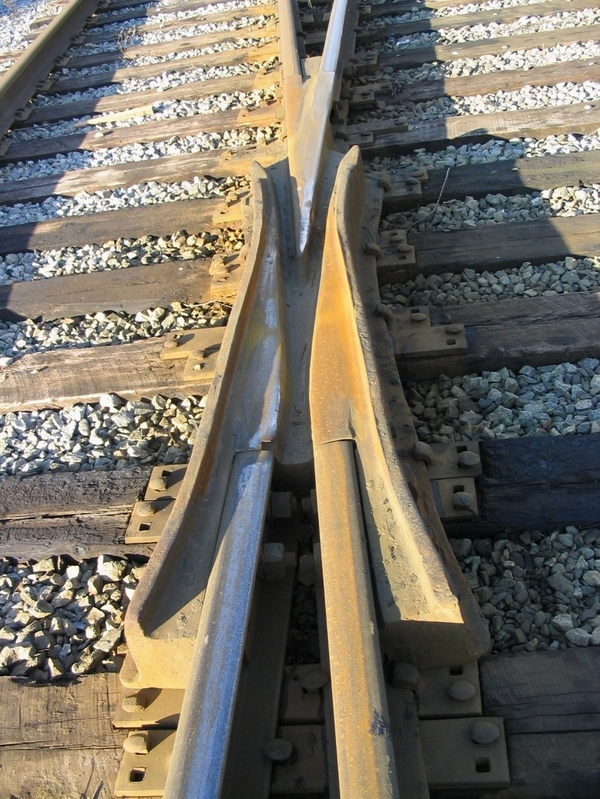
The frog, a component of a railway switch, lent its name to a series of battles for railroad dominance in the 19th century.

A frog war occurs when one private railway company attempts to cross the tracks of another, and this results in hostilities between the two railways. It is named after the frog, the piece of track that allows the two tracks to join or cross and is usually part of a level junction or railroad switch.

A frog war usually begins with legal actions, such as filing lawsuits and appealing to civic transportation authorities. But often the situation escalates into physical actions, with companies pitting their workers against one another with construction projects and train movements intended to frustrate or challenge the opposing railway.

== Division of costs ==
It is generally the case that the second railway to arrive at an intended crossing has to bear the cost of the special trackwork needed to cross the first. This includes the cost of any interlocking tower or signal box. The latter is not necessarily to the disadvantage of the second railway, since it can signal its trains through the junction ahead of those belonging to the first railway, depending on who employs the signalman.

== "Frog Wars" with oil pipelines ==
In the early days of the oil industry, most oil traveled by rail. As oil pipelines became more common, railway companies often saw them as threats to their business and refused to grant permission for pipelines to cross their tracks.

== Bridges and riverboats ==
Abraham Lincoln participated in a celebrated court case that decided that railways had as much right to bridge rivers as the riverboat had the right to navigate those rivers. Nova Scotia's Shubenacadie Canal was rendered useless by a railway bridge built across it in 1870.

== List of frog wars ==
=== Netherlands ===
- 1845: A disgruntled property developer purchased Van der Gaag Lane, a short road south of Delft, with the intention of sabotaging the construction of the Haarlem-Hague Railway. After a deal to acquire the property on the owner's own terms fell through, he vehemently refused to sell it or allow a crossing to be built, necessitating the circumvention of the property using a tight bend in the track.

=== United States ===
Note: The first railroad line built is the first one named.

- 1853: A feud between the Lake Shore & Michigan Southern Railway and the Illinois Central Railroad led both railroads to run through Grand Crossing in Chicago as if the other railroad didn't exist, finally resulting in a crash that killed 18 people.
- 1867: The South Carolina Railroad vs. the Columbia and Augusta Railroad (later the Charlotte, Columbia and Augusta Railroad). A grade crossing in Columbia was protested in court, then blocked by a parked train, then physically torn up and finally threatened by a steamed-up locomotive ready to move forward to block at any moment (Derrick: 245-246 and Fetters: 143).
- 1870s: The Denver & Rio Grande Western Railroad vs. the Atchison, Topeka & Santa Fe Railway vs. the Union Pacific. All three railroads contested one another for access through suitable mountain passes in Colorado.
- January 1870: Central Pacific Railroad vs. California Pacific Railroad. After Central Pacific blocked California Pacific from entering the city of Sacramento, California, the Supreme Court of California ordered otherwise.
- December 2, 1870–January 9, 1871: The Erie Railroad vs. the Morris & Essex Railroad's Boonton Branch (Delaware, Lackawanna and Western Railroad) at the west end of the Erie's Long Dock Tunnel in Jersey City, New Jersey.
- January 6 and January 7, 1876: The Mercer & Somerset Railway (Pennsylvania Railroad) vs. the Delaware and Bound Brook Railroad (Reading Railroad) in Hopewell, New Jersey.
- August 7–September 13, 1883: The Southern Pacific vs. the California Southern Railroad (a subsidiary of the Atchison, Topeka & Santa Fe Railway) at Colton Crossing in Colton, California (just outside San Bernardino).
- March 1886: The Erie Railroad vs. the New Jersey Junction Railroad (New York Central Railroad) at King's Bluff near Weehawken, New Jersey.
- September 1891: The Central Railroad of New Jersey vs. the Jersey City, Newark and Western Railway (Lehigh Valley Railroad) in southern Jersey City, New Jersey.
- March 1894: The Cape May and Millville Railroad (Pennsylvania Railroad) vs. the Tuckahoe and Cape May Railroad (Reading Railroad) at Woodbine Junction, New Jersey.
- 1897: The Pennsylvania Railroad vs. the New Jersey Junction Connecting Railway (Lehigh Valley Railroad) in Jersey City, New Jersey.
- December 1897: The Pennsylvania Railroad vs. the Newtown Electric Street Railway in Langhorne, Pennsylvania. This was not technically a frog war (since no grade crossing was involved), but the PRR opposed attempts to build a line through a turnpike underpass running underneath the PRR tracks. Passengers had to disembark on each side of the PRR and walk through the underpass to meet connecting trolleys.
- 1905: The Petaluma and Santa Rosa Railroad faced opposition from the Northwestern Pacific Railroad, and a standoff between workers, as well as a legal battle ensued between the two railroads.

=== United Kingdom ===
- Battle of Havant: Conflict between the London & South Western Railway and the London, Brighton & South Coast Railway over the building of the Portsmouth branch.
- Nickey Line
- Conflict between the London, Brighton & South Coast Railway and the South Eastern Railway for access to Hastings and St Leonards beyond Bo Peep Junction.

== Bibliography ==
- Derrick, Samuel M. (1933). Centennial History of South Carolina Railroad. State Publishing Company, Columbia, SC.
- Fetters, Thomas (2008). The Charleston & Hamburg. The History Press, Charleston, SC. ISBN 978-1-59629-420-2.
