= Samuel Honeyman Kneass =

American civil engineer and architect

Samuel Honeyman Kneass (1806–1858) was an American civil engineer and architect.

Kneass was born in Philadelphia, Pennsylvania, on November 5, 1806. He was the elder son of William Kneass (1781-1840), who would go on to become the second Chief Engraver of the United States Mint, and the older brother of engineer Strickland Kneass (1821-1884).

At age 15, Samuel joined the Philadelphia architectural firm of William Strickland, with which he helped build the headquarters building of the Second Bank of the United States, survey the route of the Chesapeake and Delaware Canal, and build the Susquehanna division of the Pennsylvania state canal.

In 1837 and 1838, Kneass was the lead engineer during the Philadelphia, Wilmington and Baltimore Railroad's construction of the Newkirk Viaduct, the Schuylkill River bridge that completed the first rail link between the cities. His service is noted on the 1839 Newkirk Viaduct Monument in Philadelphia.

On March 14, 1837, Kneass married Anna Lombaert (1814-1869) in Morrisville, Pennsylvania. Anna was a daughter of Charles Lombaert, who was one of the PW&B's three superintendents.

From 1849 to 1853, Kneass was the Chief Surveyor and Regulator for Philadelphia. His 1853 report to the city was "the first attempt to systematize the disparate sewers and sewerage systems in place in various municipalities around the time of Philadelphia's consolidation." He was succeeded in the job by his younger brother, Strickland, who served as Chief Engineer & Surveyor from the city's consolidation in 1855 until his retirement in 1872.

Kneass died in Philadelphia on February 15, 1858.
