= Philadelphia, Newtown and New York Railroad =

Map

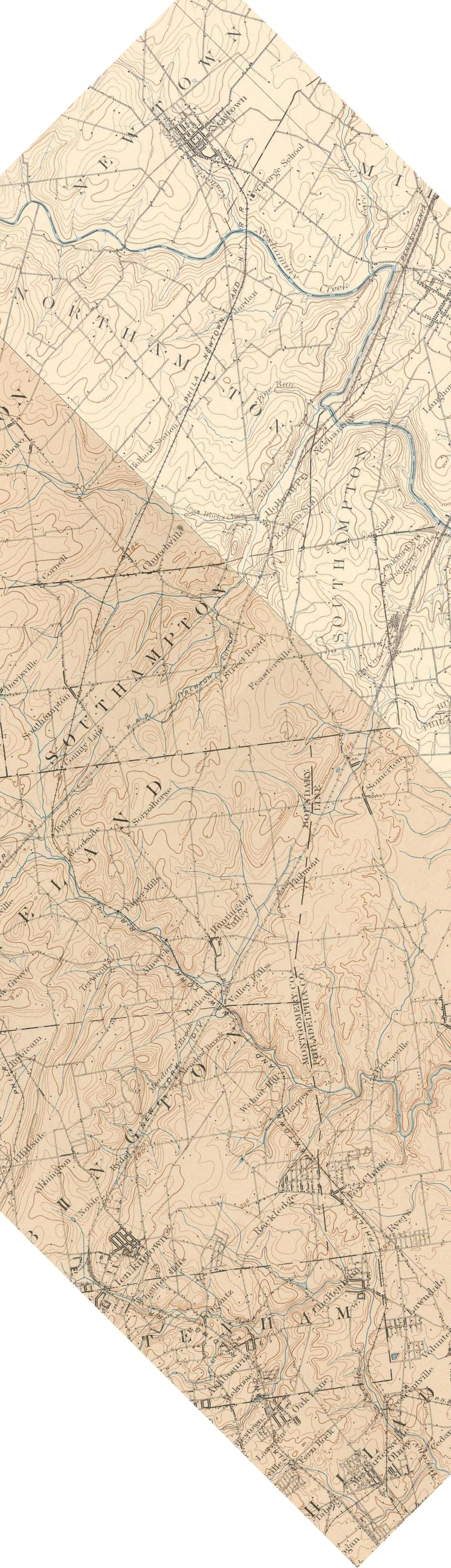
The Philadelphia, Newtown and New York railroad at the beginning of the 20th century

The Philadelphia, Newtown and New York Railroad was a railroad in southeastern Pennsylvania that is now a part of the SEPTA commuter rail system as the Fox Chase Branch. Despite the name, it only ever extended between Philadelphia and Newtown, Pennsylvania.

== History ==
The first effort to build a railroad to Newtown was incorporated as the Bristol and Newtown railroad company in 1836. Among the commissioners appointed by the state legislature to build the railroad was Charles Lombaert who had completed the Philadelphia and Trenton Railroad which ran through Bristol, Pennsylvania in 1833.

=== The Pennsylvania and the National Railway ===
The Newtown Railroad was chartered on April 2, 1860, as the Philadelphia & Montgomery County Railroad Company. The Newtown's early history was a part of the competition for rail traffic between New York City and Philadelphia. By the "Protection Act" of March 2, 1832, the New Jersey legislature gave the Camden and Amboy Railroad the exclusive right to any route across the state that would connect New York and Philadelphia. The C&A's line was from Camden via Bordentown to South Amboy, and by 1860 it had a better-located main line comprising the Philadelphia and Trenton Railroad, new construction from Trenton via Princeton to a place called Deans, and the New Jersey Railroad from there via New Brunswick, Elizabeth, and Newark, to the Hudson at Jersey City. This combination, the United New Jersey Railroad and Canal Companies, was acquired by the Pennsylvania Railroad (PRR), effective December 1, 1871.

The New Jersey monopoly law was soon to run out, and a rival line, the National Railway, was planned, but the PRR's influence in the Pennsylvania and New Jersey legislatures hindered its development. Pennsylvania's legislature passed a bill on January 29, 1873, changing the name of the Philadelphia & Montgomery County to the Philadelphia, Newtown & New York Railroad Company, and authorizing it to extend its railroad to a bridge to be constructed across the Delaware River. This authorization suggested that a new railroad in New Jersey was contemplated, to continue by some route to the Hudson River. But in that same year, on October 22, the PRR leased the line in order to keep it from the hands of the National.

=== Building the line ===
When the PRR leased the railroad, 6.1 miles (9.8 km) of track had been laid, bringing the line to Fox Chase. By March 1877, the entire 22-mile (35 km) line to Newtown was open as a branch of the Connecting Railway, with equipment furnished by the PRR. But the larger picture had changed by this date. One of the PRR's acquisitions in 1871 was an unbuilt railroad chartered a year earlier to run north from the Delaware River, and the PRR had it up and running by 1873 from Somerset Junction (on its Belvidere Delaware line) to Millstone, where it connected to a PRR branch from East Millstone to New Brunswick. Its location interfered with the Delaware and Bound Brook Railroad being built by Philadelphia and Reading Railway interests, because their railroad would now have to cross the PRR's line at some point. This led to the frog war incident at Hopewell, New Jersey, a battle of workmen, soldiers, and lawyers that was won by the Philadelphia and Reading Railway in January 1876. The PRR operated the Newtown and Somerset lines a little longer, but connecting them into a new Philadelphia and New York route would not happen. The Somerset was closed in 1879, and the Newtown line, no longer a danger, was sold to the Philadelphia and Reading Railway-controlled North Pennsylvania Railroad (NPR) the same year.

The branch off the Connecting Railroad was just east of North Penn Junction, curving into the bed of Second Street at Butler Street, and curving off at Duncannon Street to join the present-day Fox Chase line at Olney station. In 1879 the NPR ran in the bed of Third Street, and at first it branched off to the Newtown line by an S-curve in private property over to Second Street, from Erie Ave to Pike Street. By 1895 Philadelphia and Reading Railway passenger services ran from Reading Terminal and reached the Newtown line by the present-day connection parallel and north of Fisher Avenue.

=== Mergers and succession ===
The Philadelphia, Newtown and New York Railroad maintained its existence as a separate corporate entity until 1945, when it and other smaller controlled lines were merged into the Reading Company. Ownership passed to the Southeastern Pennsylvania Transportation Authority. Conrail was the designated operator of SEPTA commuter service until 1981. At that time, SEPTA operated the line as the Fox Chase Rapid Transit Line (a spin-off of the City Transit Division's Broad Street Subway) until January 1983, when service was discontinued beyond Fox Chase.
