= Fox Chase Branch =

Railway line in Pennsylvania

Fox Chase

Overview
- Owner: SEPTA

Service
- Services: Fox Chase Line

History
- Opened: 14 June 1876
- Electrified: 26 September 1966

Technical
- Line length: 4.9 mi (7.9 km)
- Track gauge: 1,435 mm (4 ft 8 1/2 in) standard gauge
- Electrification: 12 kV 25 Hz overhead catenary

The Fox Chase Branch, formerly the Newtown Branch, is a railway line in the state of Pennsylvania. It runs 4.9 miles (7.9 km) from a junction with the SEPTA Main Line near Wayne Junction to Fox Chase. At its fullest extent, it continued another fifteen miles north to Newtown. The oldest part of it was built in 1876 by the Philadelphia, Newtown and New York Railroad. It was part of the Reading Company system from 1879 until 1976. Today it is owned by SEPTA and hosts the Fox Chase Line commuter rail service.

== History ==
The Philadelphia, Newtown and New York Railroad's initial line branched off the Connecting Railway (now the Northeast Corridor) near Erie Avenue, and ran almost due north to Olney and across the Tacony Creek to Cheltenham and Fox Chase. The new line was 5.8 miles (9.3 km) long. The Pennsylvania Railroad controlled the line at the beginning, and contemplated extending it across the Delaware River to create a new through route between Philadelphia and New York City, although this never occurred. Service began on June 14, 1876. (Note: Dates given in other sources include October 1876 and 1873.) The company further extended the line 15.45 miles (24.86 km) from Fox Chase to Newtown on February 4, 1878.

The Philadelphia and Reading Railroad leased the line on November 12, 1879, ending the Pennsylvania Railroad's involvement with the company. The plan at the time was to build a connecting branch west from Olney to a junction with the Tabor Branch near Wayne Junction and route passenger trains to the Philadelphia, Germantown and Norristown Railroad depot at Ninth and Green. This did not happen immediately, so trains from the Newtown Branch continued down the North Pennsylvania Railroad's main line to that railroad's depot at Third and Berks. The planned link with the Tabor Branch was built in 1892. Post re-routing, the original part of the branch south of Olney was designated the Olney Branch.

The Reading proceeded with its own faster New York to Philadelphia route in 1904–1906 with the building of the New York Short Line. The new line branched off from the Newtown Branch at Cheltenham and ran northeast to Neshaminy Falls on the New York Branch. The Newtown Branch was double-tracked between Newtown Junction and Cheltenham Junction as part of this effort. The new line opened on May 27, 1906. Administratively, the Newtown Branch's southern terminus was cut back to Cheltenham Junction once the New York Short Line opened.

The Philadelphia, Newtown & New York Railroad was one of twelve railroads merged into the Reading Company effective December 31, 1945. The Newtown Branch was the last of Reading's suburban branches to be electrified. The city of Philadelphia funded the effort through the Passenger Service Improvement Corporation (PSIC), and the branch was electrified to Fox Chase, the last station within the city limits, on September 29, 1966. Diesel operation continued north of Fox Chase to Newtown.

Following the final bankruptcy of the Reading Company in 1976, ownership of the Newtown Branch was transferred to SEPTA. SEPTA suspended diesel-powered commuter rail service north of Fox Chase on July 1, 1981, as part of a systemwide discontinuation of non-electrified lines. A modified shuttle service, branded as the Fox Chase Rapid Transit Line, operated between October 5, 1981, and January 18, 1983, before it was discontinued.

The rail right-of-way beyond Fox Chase remains largely intact and has not been formally abandoned. Although commuter service has not resumed, the corridor remains preserved in a dormant state. Certain segments have been repurposed for interim use as multi-use rail trails. Proposals to restore passenger service, particularly as a means of addressing traffic congestion along Interstate 295, have been periodically discussed. In the early 2010s, the Pennsylvania Transit Expansion Coalition (PA‑TEC), a regional transit advocacy organization, promoted the restoration of commuter rail service along the Fox Chase–Newtown corridor. PA‑TEC engaged with local governments and community groups and supported municipal resolutions calling for feasibility studies and phased reactivation of the line. While these efforts renewed public discussion, no restoration of rail service has been implemented, and the corridor remains inactive.

The remaining line between Cheltenham Junction and Fox Chase became known as the Fox Chase Branch, and SEPTA continues to operate the Fox Chase Line commuter rail service over it. The former New York Short Line became part of Conrail's Trenton Line, with SEPTA and Conrail sharing the track between Cheltenham Junction and Newton Junction. Beginning in 1989 that double-tracked portion was functionally split, with each operator using one track. The two lines were physically separated in 2004–2005. SEPTA activated positive train control on the Fox Chase Line on May 23, 2016.
