= Alfred G. Mayer =

American entomologist and marine biologist (1868–1922)

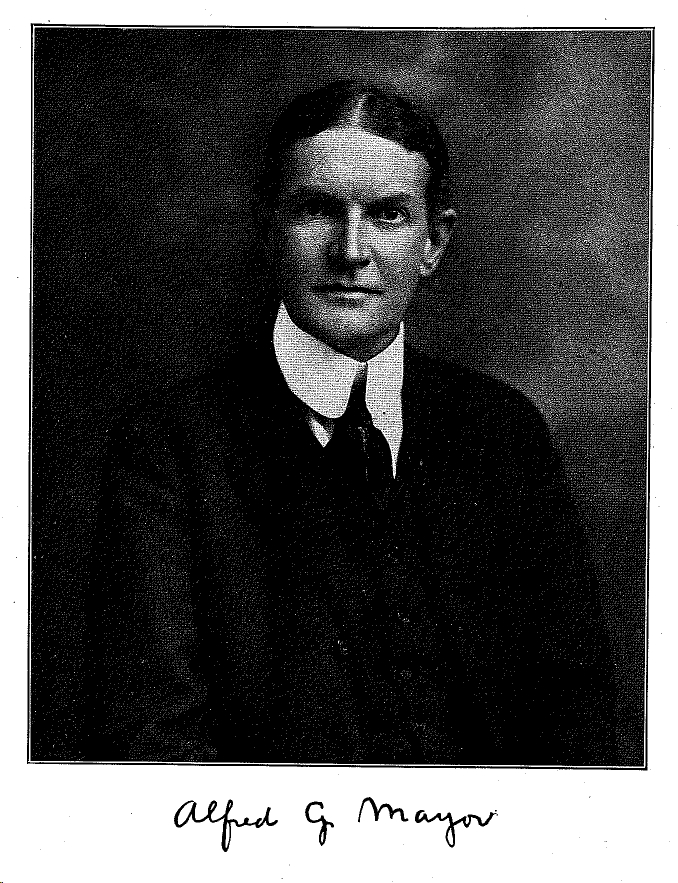

Alfred Goldsborough Mayor born Mayer (April 16, 1868 – June 24, 1922) was an American physicist, marine biologist and zoologist, whose fascination with medusae (jellyfish) while working with Alexander Agassiz marked a turning point in his career, which shifted from physics to biology. Mayor also had many publications and papers about topics ranging from physics to hunting and fishing. He applied mathematics and physics to biology and took an interest in the formation of color patterns in animals.

== Education ==
Mayor was born in Sunnyside, Frederick, Maryland, the son of Katherine Duckett (Goldsborough) and Alfred Marshall Mayer. His mother died shortly after his birth and he grew up with his father and his step-mother Maria Snowden. His father became a professor of physics at Stevens Institute. He was of part German descent. An uncle Frank Blackwell Mayer was a French-trained artist. Another uncle Brantz Mayer was an archeologist. Dropping out from school at age sixteen, he began to work in a machinist's shop. To please the request of his father, Alfred enrolled in the Stevens Institute of Technology and graduated ME in 1889. He worked with Professor Michaelson at Clark University for a year, then with Lucien Blake at the University of Kansas (1890–92) and then shifted to biology at Harvard University in 1892. He studied the colors and patterns of butterflies and moths under Edward L. Mark and was encouraged by Alexander Agassiz at Newport. Agassiz also had him study marine organisms. Professor Blake stated that," [Alfred was] successful in Physics,...his true taste and longings were toward natural history." He accompanied Agassiz in 1892-93 on a cruise in the Bahamas and in 1896 he visited the Great Barrier Reef. In 1897, he graduated from Harvard University with a Sc.D.

== Career ==
Mayor's most recognized work originated from his work as a successful marine biologist. He became the chief curator of the Brooklyn Institute in 1900 and in 1904 he became director of marine zoology at the Carnegie Institution. He published his first book about jellyfish in 1910 titled Medusae of the World, which documented his many studies of species of jellyfish around the world.

In 1907 Mayor founded the Tortugas Laboratory on Garden Key (today Fort Jefferson National Monument), maintained by the Carnegie Institution for Science, where each summer marine biologists studied the life of the coral reef. He was elected to the American Philosophical Society in 1914. Mayor died on nearby Loggerhead Key, Dry Tortugas, aged 54.

During World War I he took part in the war. The research ship Anton Dohrn was put into US Navy service between 1917 and 1918 to serve as a patrol boat. Mayor passed the mariners examination and taught navigation to navy men. In 1918 he taught seamanship at Princeton University and also published a booklet on navigation. He changed his family name from Mayer to Mayor on August 5, 1918 in the court of Mercer County, New Jersey to disassociate himself from his German ancestry. His family had lived in the United States from 1785.

His interests included the evolution of snails, coloration of insects, and nerve impulse transmission. He applied mathematics and physics to biology and examined how scales affected the wings of butterflies. He used a projection to examine the homologous areas of the wings of butterflies and commented that mimesis was restricted by the physiological abilities involved in pattern formation. He also examined the pigments and examined the colors produced using spectroscopy. His work drew the critique of Alfred Russell Wallace. He also examined the probabilities of mutations in speciation. He examined the speed of nerve impulses in jellyfish kept in different concentrations of salt and found the mathematical relationship.

Mayor married artist and sculptor Harriet Randolph Hyatt Mayor, daughter of paleontologist Alpheus Hyatt, in 1900. Their son A. Hyatt Mayor became an art historian. In 1919 he studied corals off Samoa at 8.5 fathoms depth making use of a diving hood which may have made him prone to infection and illness. His wife Harriet contracted tuberculosis in 1910 and they spent time in European sanatoria. She recovered but Mayor picked up tuberculosis and died after fainting and falling into water at Loggerhead Key.

== Works ==
- On the color and color-patterns of moths and butterflies, 1897
- Rhythmical pulsation in Scyphomedusae, 1906
- Medusae of the World, 1910

== Organisms named after Mayer ==
- Mayorella Schaeffer, 1926
- Ectopleura mayeri Petersen, 1990
- Rissoina mayori Dall, 1925
- Eutiara mayeri Bigelow, 1918
- Melicertissa mayeri Kramp, 1959
- Lobonema mayeri Light, 1914
- Coeloseris mayeri Vaughan, 1918
- Porites mayeri Vaughan, 1918
- likely Gadila mayori Henderson, 1920
