= Brantz =

Brantz is a surname. Notable people with the surname include:

- Lewis Brantz (c. 1768–1838), American merchant
- Loryn Brantz, American author and illustrator
- Stephanie Brantz (born 1972), Australian sports presenter

== See also ==
- Brantz Mayer (1809–1879), American author, lawyer, and historian
