= Audella Beebe Hyatt =

American woman artist (1840–1932)

Audella "Della" Beebe Hyatt (14 February 1840 – 23 November 1932) was an American illustrator and watercolorist. Born in Kinderhook, New York, she married paleontologist Alpheus Hyatt in 1867. Much of their life was spent at homes in Annisquam, Massachusetts and Cape Ann, Massachusetts. Della assisted her husband with his research, providing illustrations for his books on marine life and paleontological works, but was an accomplished artist in her own right having studied with Boston painter William Morris Hunt at his summer studio in Gloucester and later with Helen M. Knowlton. Her works are held by museums around the country including the Cape Ann Museum.

Alpheus and Della had four children, two of whom were the sculptors Harriet Randolph Hyatt Mayor and Anna Hyatt Huntington.
