= Harriet H. Mayor =

American artist and sculptor

- Born: Harriet Randolph Hyatt; April 25, 1868; Salem, Massachusetts
- Died: January 1, 1960; Bethel, Connecticut
- Education: Henry H. Kitson, Dennis Bunker
- Known for: Sculptor
- Notable work: Head of Laughing Girl (sculpture), Shouting Boy (sculpture)
- Spouse: Alfred Goldsborough Mayor

Harriet Randolph Hyatt Mayor (1868-1960) was an American artist and sculptor active in the late 19th century. She contributed work to the World's Columbian Exposition, among other exhibitions.

== Life and career ==
Harriet Randolph Hyatt was born in Salem, Massachusetts in 1868, the daughter of illustrators Audella Beebe Hyatt and Alpheus Hyatt II, the noted paleontologist.

After traveling abroad with her family at an early age she began to show artistic tendencies. She studied art and sculpture in Boston, Massachusetts under Henry H. Kitson and Dennis Bunker. She encouraged her sister Anna to join her in sculpting; Anna would go on to become one of the leading sculptors of her generation.

The 1893 World's Columbian Exposition featured a wide assortment of American sculptors, and Hyatt had one work, Head of Laughing Girl exhibited there. She was awarded a silver medal at the 1895 Cotton States and International Exposition. She also exhibited her work in New York, Philadelphia, Boston, and Salon, Paris, 1908.

Harriet was married in 1900 to the natural scientist Alfred Goldsborough Mayor, son of physicist Alfred M. Mayer. The couple had four children, A. Hyatt, Katharine, Brantz, and Barbara. Her great-granddaughter is actress Yeardley Smith.

In 1912, Mayor was suffering from a mild case of tuberculosis, and went abroad with her children. She barely escaped Germany before World War I began. After her husband's death in 1922, Mayor spent time traveling in Europe, and became active in the Daughters of the American Revolution, serving as regent of the Princeton, New Jersey chapter. The association contributed to her interest in genealogy, and she made studies of the Hyatt and Mayor family trees. She lived most of her later years in Princeton, only leaving to live with her sister Anna during her last year.

She died at the Huntington estate in Bethel, Connecticut, on January 1, 1960, aged 92.
