= Yeardley Smith =

American actress (born 1964)

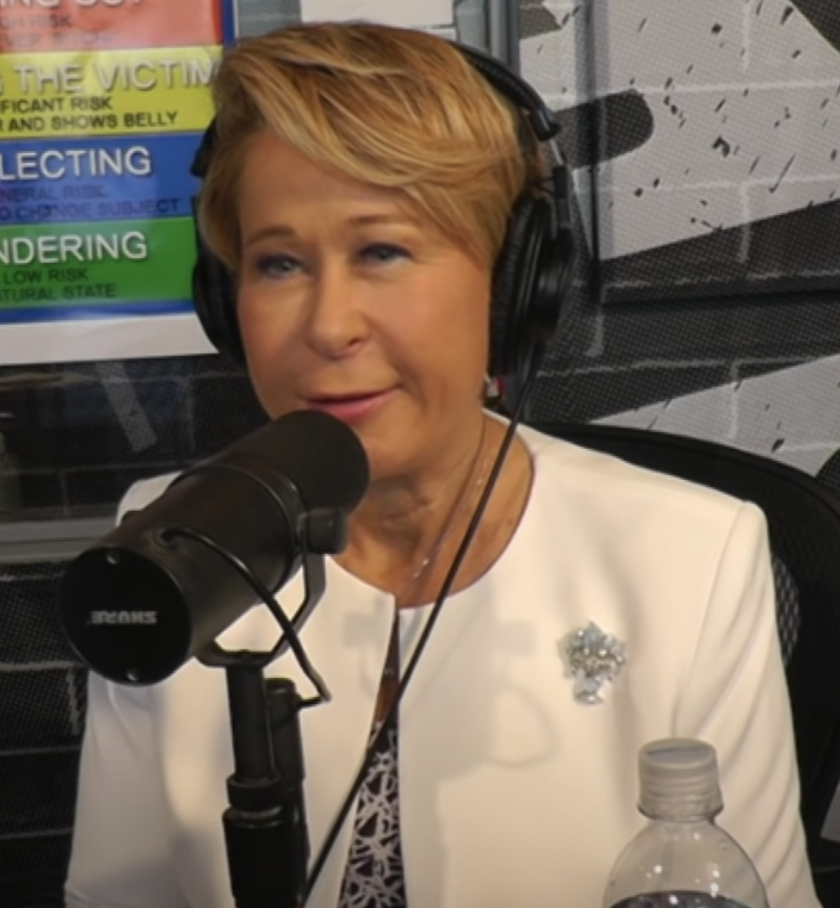
- Smith interviewed on The Woody Show in 2019
- Born: Martha Maria Yeardley Smith; July 3, 1964 (age 62); Paris, France
- Citizenship: United States
- Occupation: Actress
- Years active: 1982–present
- Spouses: Christopher Grove (m. 1990; div. 1992); Daniel Erickson (m. 2002; div. 2008); Daniel Grice (m. 2022)

Martha Yeardley Maria Smith (/ˈjɑːrdli/ YARD-lee; born July 3, 1964) is an American actress and podcast host. She stars as the voice of Lisa Simpson on the animated television series The Simpsons.

Smith began acting in 1982 after graduating from drama school. She moved to New York City in 1984, where she appeared in the Broadway production of Tom Stoppard's The Real Thing. She made her film debut in 1985's Heaven Help Us, followed by roles in The Legend of Billie Jean and Maximum Overdrive. She moved to Los Angeles in 1986 and took a recurring role in the television series Brothers.

In 1987, Smith auditioned for the Simpsons shorts on The Tracey Ullman Show. Smith intended to audition for the role of Bart Simpson, but the casting director felt her voice was too high, and she was cast as Bart's sister Lisa. In 1989, the shorts were spun off into their own half-hour show, The Simpsons. For her work on The Simpsons, Smith received a Primetime Emmy Award for Outstanding Voice-Over Performance in 1992.

Alongside The Simpsons, Smith appeared in the sitcom Herman's Head as Louise, and had recurring appearances as Marlene on Dharma & Greg and as Penny in two episodes of Dead Like Me. She has appeared in several films, including City Slickers, Just Write, Toys, and As Good as It Gets. In 2004, Smith performed an off-Broadway one-woman show entitled More at the Union Square Theatre in New York City. Aside from The Simpsons, Smith has recorded few voice-over parts, only commercials and the film We're Back! A Dinosaur's Story. Smith starred in and served as executive producer for the independent romantic comedy Waiting For Ophelia, which had its world premiere at the Phoenix Film Festival in April 2009.

== Early life ==
Smith was born on July 3, 1964, in Paris, France. Her father, Joseph Smith, worked for United Press International in Paris and moved to Washington, D.C., in 1966, where he became The Washington Post's first official obituary editor. Her mother, Martha Mayor, was a paper conservator for the Freer and Sackler Galleries at the Smithsonian Institution. She is one of 5 children.. Her name is her father's middle name. Smith's parents later divorced. Her maternal grandfather was art historian A. Hyatt Mayor, and among her great-grandparents were marine biologist and zoologist Alpheus Hyatt and artist and sculptor Harriet Randolph Hyatt Mayor. She is also the paternal niece of political scientist, historian, and Latin American studies specialist Peter H. Smith. Smith has labeled her family "upper crust and reserved". As a child, Smith was often teased because of her unusual voice. Smith has stated: "I've sounded pretty much the same way since I was six. Maybe [my voice is] a little deeper now." She made her acting debut in a sixth-grade play.

== Career ==
=== Early career ===
Smith became a professional actress in 1982. After appearances in a number of school plays, she joined the local Arena Stage theater group on an apprenticeship, featuring in their production of Peter Pan. She went on to star in several other plays in Washington. She moved to New York City in 1984 and appeared in the Broadway production of Tom Stoppard's play The Real Thing alongside Jeremy Irons and Glenn Close.

Smith's first film role came in Heaven Help Us (1985). She then played Putter in The Legend of Billie Jean (also 1985). The film was a box office bomb and critically panned, although Smith "thought it would be the movie that launched my career. And then it was out at the box office about 10 days before it died." When filming was over, she rejoined The Real Thing before being out of work for six months. Smith worried her career was over. However, the following year, she played Connie in Stephen King's Maximum Overdrive (1986), noting it was "truly a dreadful film, but I had a great part in it."

Smith moved to Los Angeles in 1986 on the "semi-promise" of a part in a TV film. After the audition, the role was given to another actress. Smith realized "that people don't mean what they say. It's not malicious. They just don't realize how much impact they have on an impressionable actor – and all actors are impressionable." From then on, she decided to "just sort of build a wall around myself", to cope with the disappointment of not getting a part. In Los Angeles, Smith appeared in theatrical productions of Living on Salvation Street, for which she was paid $14 for each performance, Boys and Girls/Men and Women, and How the Other Half Loves, and played the recurring role of Louella Waters on the Showtime series Brothers. She appeared in the films The Legend of Billie Jean and Ginger Ale Afternoon (1989) as "trailer-park girls". She later spoke of her regrets of appearing in the latter in her one-woman show More.

=== The Simpsons ===
It's a happy fluke. When she was cast back in 1987, I just liked the sound of her voice. She's also a great actress. In general, people who make their living doing voices on cartoons aren't always great for us. Most cartoons want things peppy and cartoony. Yeardley is able to go through moments of great emotion and wring it for all she's worth.

— Matt Groening on Smith's vocal style

Smith's longest-running role is voicing Lisa Simpson on The Simpsons. She has voiced Lisa since 1987, beginning with The Simpsons shorts on The Tracey Ullman Show. Smith had initially been asked to audition for the role of Lisa's brother Bart, but casting director Bonita Pietila thought her voice was too high. Smith later recalled "I always sounded too much like a girl, I read two lines as Bart and they said, 'Thanks for coming!'" Smith was given the role of Lisa, instead. She denies rumors that she almost turned down the role, though admits she had never planned a career in voice-over work. Pietila stated that, having seen her in Living on Salvation Street, Smith was always her preferred choice. Smith lifts her voice up slightly to perform the role. Lisa is the only regular character voiced by Smith, although in some earlier episodes, she provided some of Maggie's squeaks and occasional speaking parts. Smith has only voiced characters other than Lisa on very rare occasions, with those characters usually being some derivative of Lisa, such as Lisa Bella in "Last Tap Dance in Springfield" and Lisa Jr. in "Missionary: Impossible" (both from season 11 in 2000). Smith spends two days a week recording the show.

Until 1998 Smith was paid $30,000 per episode. During a pay dispute in 1998, Fox threatened to replace the six main voice actors with new actors, going as far as preparing to cast new voices. However, the dispute was soon resolved and she received $125,000 per episode until 2004, when the voice actors demanded that they be paid $360,000 per episode. The issue was resolved a month later, and Smith earned $250,000 per episode. Following salary renegotiations in 2008, the voice actors received about $400,000 per episode. Three years later, with Fox threatening to cancel the series unless production costs were cut, Smith and the other cast members accepted a 25% pay cut, down to just over $300,000 per episode.

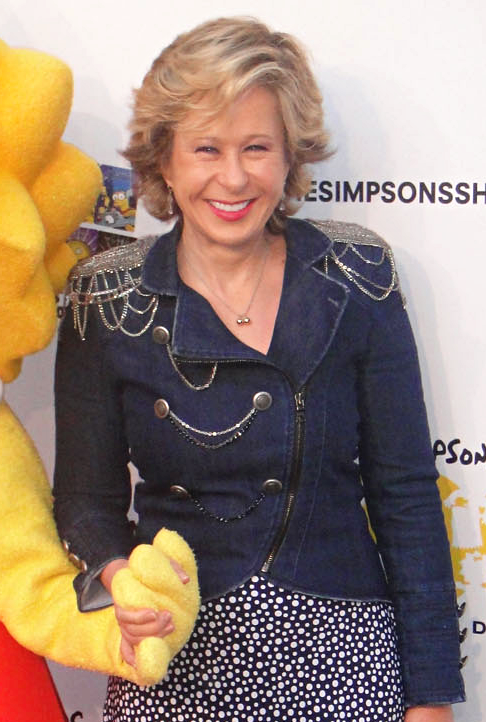
Smith at the Simpsons 500th Episode Marathon, February 2012

Despite her world-famous role, Smith is rarely recognized in public, which she does not mind, saying, "it's wonderful to be in the midst of all this hype about the show, and people enjoying the show so much, and to be totally a fly on the wall; people never recognise me solely from my voice." In a 2009 interview with The Guardian, she commented: "It's the best job ever. I have nothing but gratitude for the amount of freedom The Simpsons has bought me in my life."

Smith received a Primetime Emmy Award in 1992, but felt it was not worth anything, saying "there's part of me that feels it wasn't even a real Emmy." The Emmy for Outstanding Voice-Over Performance is a Creative Arts and not handed out during the primetime telecast and, prior to 2009, was a juried award without nominations. However, Smith says "if I had to be associated with one character in fiction, I will always be thrilled that it was Lisa Simpson." The show's creator Matt Groening has called Smith very similar to Lisa: "Yeardley has strong moral views about her character. There are lines that are written for Lisa that Yeardley reads and says, 'No, I wouldn't say that.'" Writer Jay Kogen praised her performance on the show, particularly in the episode "Lisa's Substitute", as able "to move past comedy to something really strong and serious and dramatic".

=== Further career ===
From 1991 to 1994, alongside The Simpsons, Smith was one of the lead cast members in the sitcom Herman's Head as Louise. Her other television roles include recurring appearances as Marlene on Dharma & Greg, and Penny in two episodes of Dead Like Me. Smith has also appeared in Phil of the Future and Teen Angel. Her one-scene role as pregnant checkout girl Nancy in 1991's City Slickers earned her "more attention than all [her] previous roles combined", and taught her "that it's far better to have small parts in big movies that everyone sees." In 1997, she appeared as Lulu the palm reader in the independent film Just Write. Her other roles include parts in Barry Levinson's Toys and James L. Brooks' As Good as It Gets. Brooks, who is also executive producer of The Simpsons, had cast Smith in his 1994 film I'll Do Anything (in one of the film's musical numbers), but her part was cut. Aside from The Simpsons, Smith has recorded few voice-over parts, only commercials and the film We're Back! A Dinosaur's Story. She "had a voice-over agent for about two years, and I used to go out [on auditions] all the time, but it never really came to anything. Everybody said, 'Oh Yeardley, you'll clean up,' and that was definitely not the case."

In 2004 Smith performed her own off-Broadway one-woman show entitled More at the Union Square Theatre in New York City. Directed by Judith Ivey, the play is about her mixed feelings over the success of The Simpsons, her parents, her relationships, and her struggles with bulimia. The New York Times critic Margo Jefferson called it an "appealing if overlong show", adding that "The career narrative needed shortening. This would involve some editing and revising but wouldn't taint the best parts of More. It is refreshing to hear a celebrity talk cleanly about being fame-driven and about not getting the degree or the kind of fame you craved. It's fun to watch a skilled actress use her craft to the full." She would later perform the play for three weeks in Los Angeles the following year.

Smith starred in and served as executive producer for the independent romantic comedy Waiting for Ophelia, which was released in 2009. She funded the film, which was written by Adam Carl and based on a stage play he wrote in 2003. She said: "I loved it. I never get to play parts like that. I always play the friend of a friend, never the lead. And the script surprised me." Carl stated it was very unlikely she would recoup her money, but Smith decided she "believe[d] in this project, and my expectations have already been fulfilled by making the movie", and added: "You can support art even if it's not going to make a zillion dollars." It premiered on April 4, 2009, at the Phoenix Film Festival.

In 2010 she had a small but attention-getting guest role in The Big Bang Theory, as a counselor trying to place Sheldon in a job.

In 2011 Smith starred as Ms. Miller in the movie The Chaperone alongside Triple H and Ariel Winter.

In June 2016 the Human Rights Campaign released a video in tribute to the victims of the Orlando nightclub shooting; in the video, Smith and others told the stories of the people killed there. On March 30, 2019, Smith was honored with the Human Rights Campaign's National Leadership Award in Los Angeles for her work as an advocate of the LGBT community.

In 2017 Smith started a podcast, Small Town Dicks, which explores real life crime in small towns in the United States. Smith had co-hosted the podcast with actress and long-time friend Zibby Allen until March 2019 when the two filed lawsuits against one another, with Allen accusing Smith of pushing her out of ownership and profit rights from the show.

== Politics ==
Smith is a lifelong Democrat.

In 2018 Smith mocked Republican Ted Cruz after he labeled the Democratic Party as "the party of Lisa Simpson". Smith recommended that people of differing political views should be able to work together on gun control, promoting gay rights and environmentalism.

== Personal life ==
Smith married English-Canadian actor Christopher Grove in 1990. They were divorced in 1992, citing irreconcilable differences.

In a 1997 interview with The Daily Targum Smith stated "I am shy, but I have an extroverted persona which I can draw on when I need to," and that she is a "private" actress.

She married Daniel Erickson in 2002; the marriage lasted for six years and Smith filed for divorce on May 21, 2008, citing irreconcilable differences.

In 2009, she commented, "People have said to me that I'm unassuming. It's true, I'm the worst celebrity ever. But I'm trying to become better."

Smith had bulimia when she was a teenager. She noted "It would make me high, I would feel endorphins and this great sense of victory."

Smith enjoys writing and painting. During the first season of Herman's Head, Smith taught herself to paint by copying other artists. The book Just Humor Me includes a story, "The Race", written by Smith. She has written a children's book, I, Lorelei, which was published by HarperCollins in February 2009.

In 2011, Smith launched a women's shoe line called Marchez Vous.

In November 2021 Yeardley was noted for producing a podcast on the murder of Sheila Anderson, one of Scotland's most notorious unsolved murders.

On June 11, 2022, Smith married one of the co-hosts of her podcast, Small Town Dicks, Detective (Ret) Dan Grice. She met him while he was providing personal security for her during a Simpsons event.

== Filmography ==
=== Film ===
Year	Film	Role	Notes
1985	Heaven Help Us	Kathleen	
1985	The Legend of Billie Jean	Putter	
1986	Maximum Overdrive	Connie	
1987	Three O'Clock High	Cheerleader	
1989	Listen to Me	Cootz	
1989	Silence Like Glass	Karen	
1989	Ginger Ale Afternoon	Bonnie Cleator	
1991	City Slickers	Nancy	
1992	Toys	Researcher Miss Drum	
1993	We're Back! A Dinosaur's Story	Cecilia Nuthatch	Voice
1996	Jingle All the Way	Woman who hits Howard with her purse	Uncredited
1997	Just Write	Lulu	
1997	As Good as It Gets	Jackie Simpson	
2002	Back by Midnight	Veronica	
2007	The Simpsons Movie	Lisa Simpson	Voice
2009	The Pinky:st. Movie	Jennifer	Voice
2009	Waiting for Ophelia	Caitlin O'Malley	Also executive producer
2009	The Miracle of Phil	Holly	
2009	Tug	Mom	
2010	High School	Teacher	Cameo appearance
2010	Virginia	Mrs. Whitaker	
2011	The Chaperone	Ms. Miller	
2011	New Year's Eve	Maude	
2011	Spork	Ms. Danahy	
2016	Miles	Mrs. Armstrong	
2018	All Square	Beaches	Producer
2021	The Good, the Bart, and the Loki	Lisa Simpson	Short film
2021	Plusaversary	Lisa Simpson	Short film
2022	When Billie Met Lisa	Lisa Simpson	Short film
2022	Welcome to the Club	Lisa Simpson, Snow White	Short film
2022	The Simpsons Meet the Bocellis in "Feliz Navidad"	Lisa Simpson	Short film

=== Television ===
Year	Series	Role	Notes
1984	ABC Afterschool Special	Jenny	Episode 13.4: "Mom's on Strike"
1987–1989	Brothers	Louella Waters	Appeared in 46 episodes
1985	The Recovery Room	Jill	TV film
1986	Tales from the Darkside	Betty Ann Cooper	Episode 2.23: "Fear of Floating"
1986	Mama's Family	Bonita Rokiki	Episode 3.11: "Where There's Smoke"
1987	Square One Television (Mathnet)	Jane Rice-Burroughs	Appeared in four episodes; Episode 1.2: "The Problem of the Missing Monkey"
1987–1989	The Tracey Ullman Show	Lisa Simpson (voice)	The Simpsons shorts
1988	CBS Summer Playhouse	Paula Bennett	Episode 2.17: "Tickets, Please"
1989	Murphy Brown	Phoebe Cramer	Episode 2.5: "Miles' Big Adventure"
1989–present	The Simpsons	Lisa Simpson, Various voices (voice)	Main cast member; longest-running role Primetime Emmy Award for Outstanding Voice-Over Performance
1990	Sydney	Tracy Cole	Episode 1.8: "The Me Nobody Knows"
1990	42nd Primetime Emmy Awards	Lisa Simpson (voice)	TV special
1991–1994	Herman's Head	Louise Fitzer	Main cast member; appeared in all 72 episodes
1991	Sesame Street	Lisa Simpson (voice)	One episode; Celebrity Monster in the Mirror
1991–2004	Rugrats	Brown Dummy Bear, additional voices (voice)	
1992	Likely Suspects	Unnamed character	Episode 1.11: "Am I Not Your Stiff"
1994	Empty Nest	Sally	Episode 7.3: "Just for Laughs"
1997	Toothless	Gatekeeper	TV film
1997	Smart Guy	Mrs. Rawlings	Episode 2.5: "Dumbstruck"
1997	Teen Angel	Miss Gross	Episode 1.8: "Jeremiah Was a Bullfrog"
1997–2002	Dharma & Greg	Marlene	Appeared in 17 episodes
1998	Sports Night	Malory Moss	Episode 1.4: "Intellectual Property"
1999	Nash Bridges	Stevie Strong	Episode 5.9: "Crosstalk"
2001	Last Dance	Unnamed character	TV film
2003	Becker	Ruby	Episode 5.19: "Ms. Fortune"
2004	Dead Like Me	Penny	Episodes 2.12: "Forget Me Not" and 2.14: "Always"
2005	Phil of the Future	Mandy Teslow	Episodes 1.18: "Double Trouble" and 1.20: "Corner Pocket"
2005	Strong Medicine	Real Estate Agent	Episode 6.5: "Dying Inside"
2009	Mad Men	Nurse	Episode 3.5: "The Fog"
2009	The Wishing Well	Mary	TV film
2010	The Big Bang Theory	Sandy	Episode 3.14: "The Einstein Approximation"
2010	The Simpsons 20th Anniversary Special – In 3-D! On Ice!	Herself; Lisa Simpson (voice)	TV special
2012	FOX 25th Anniversary Special	Lisa Simpson (voice)	TV special
2013	Hot in Cleveland	Margaret	Episode 4.21: "Corpse Bride"
2014	Revenge	Phyllis	Episode 4.1: "Renaissance"
2014	Family Guy	Lisa Simpson (voice)	Episode 13.1: "The Simpsons Guy"
2014–2015	The Mindy Project	Carolyn	Episode 3.6: "Caramel Princess Time" and Episode 3.12: Stanford
2016	Fresh Off the Boat	Marie (Costco Employee)	Episode 3.6: "WWJD: What Would Jessica Do?"
2017	Mom	Enid	Episode 4.21: "A Few Thongs and A Hawaiian Funeral"

=== Video games ===
Year	Game	Voice role
1991	The Simpsons	Lisa Simpson
1996	The Simpsons Cartoon Studio	Lisa Simpson
1997	Virtual Springfield	Lisa Simpson
1999	The Simpsons Bowling	Lisa Simpson
2000	The Simpsons Wrestling	Lisa Simpson
2001	The Simpsons: Road Rage	Lisa Simpson
2002	The Simpsons Skateboarding	Lisa Simpson
2003	The Simpsons: Hit & Run	Lisa Simpson
2007	The Simpsons Game	Lisa Simpson
2012	The Simpsons: Tapped Out	Lisa Simpson
2025	Fortnite Battle Royale	Lisa Simpson

=== Music videos ===
Year	Song	Role	Artist
1990	"Do the Bartman"	Lisa Simpson	Nancy Cartwright

=== Theme park ===
Year	Ride	Role
2008	The Simpsons Ride	Lisa Simpson

=== Podcasts ===
Year	Show	Role
2017–present	Small Town Dicks	Co-host
2019	Harmontown	Special guest (episode 337)
2020	Jensen and Holes: The Murder Squad	Special guest (January 20, 2020)
2021	I Said No Gifts!	Special guest (June 3, 2021)
2022	The Adam Carolla Show	Special guest (March 20, 2022)
