= Preserve the Baltimore Uprising =

Digital archive preserving media about the protests following Freddie Gray's death

Preserve the Baltimore Uprising is a digital archive devoted to preserving and making accessible media created and captured by people and organizations involved in or witness to the protests following Freddie Gray's death in 2015.

The Maryland Center for History and Culture is a community partner of the program. The archive is crowd-sourced, and as of 2018, has over 3,000 documents including images and oral histories. These documents sometimes tell different stories about the events than the ones told in mainstream media outlets, including portraying hope and reform rather than violence. The archive is now considered a key resource in teaching about the protests and about the history of Baltimore. Materials from the archive were included in the Maryland Historical Society's 2016-2017 What & Why: Collecting at the Maryland Historical Society exhibit.

The project was co-founded by Dr. Denise Meringolo, an Associate Professor and public historian at the University of Maryland, Baltimore County, and Joe Tropea, Curator of Films & Photographs at the Maryland Historical Society. Other collaborators include faculty from University of Baltimore, Coppin State University, Morgan State University, Maryland Institute College of Art, and Johns Hopkins University, as well as staff from the Maryland State Archives. The idea for the archive grew out of Meringolo's awareness that the local community, and not just museums or archival institutions, should be able to tell the history of the events through their own documents. Meringolo furthered work on the archive as a 2018-2019 Whiting Public Engagement Fellow.

This is one of many grassroots digital projects emerging from the Black Lives Matter movement aimed at recording the experiences of communities as events unfold, along with projects such as A People's Archive of Police Violence in Cleveland, Documenting Ferguson, and the Sandra Bland Digital Archive. These projects also have in common a particular focus on themes of anti-discrimination, equality, and diversifying the historical record.
