= Barry Landau =

American self-styled historian

Barry H. Landau (born c. 1948) is a noted thief of presidential artifacts, collector of presidential artifacts, author, and "self-styled 'America's Presidential Historian'". In July 2011, Landau's associate, 24-year-old Jason Savedoff, was seen taking a document out of a library. After an investigation and various searches, Landau and Savedoff were "charged with stealing valuable historical documents from the Maryland Historical Society and conspiring to steal documents from other archives." After pleading guilty, Landau was sentenced to seven years' imprisonment in June 2012.

== Biography ==
Landau stated his interest in the presidency began at the age of 10, when his mother took him to see then President Dwight D. Eisenhower; he claimed to have spoken with both the president and First Lady Mamie Eisenhower at that time. The Wall Street Journal, however, reported that he wrote a letter to the president and received a card in reply.

He worked as a press agent in New York in the 1970s and 1980s. He also claimed that "he was a protocol officer under President Gerald R. Ford and that he once traveled to Moscow with President Richard M. Nixon," though the presidential libraries could find no supporting evidence.

He amassed such a large collection of presidential memorabilia that, in 2005, Larry Bird, a curator of the National Museum of American History, stated that he possessed "the most extensive collection of inaugural memorabilia outside the Smithsonian, the National Archives or the presidential libraries."

For the 2001 inauguration of George W. Bush, the Joint Congressional Committee on Inaugural Ceremonies turned to him for china plates for the inaugural luncheon.

In 2007, Landau wrote a book titled The President's Table and showed off some prized pieces of his collection on The Martha Stewart Show. He also served as a commentator on CNN and NBC's Today Show.

== Thefts ==
The staff of the Maryland Historical Society became suspicious of the behavior of frequent visitors Landau and 24-year-old Jason Savedoff, whom Landau had identified as his nephew, though they are not related. Landau "certainly was very personable; he had class. He knew how to conduct himself in a research library, but Savedoff, of whom little is known, was 'rough around the edges' and 'repeatedly asked naive questions,' he said".

On July 9, 2011, a staff member saw Savedoff take a document out of the society's library in Baltimore and police were called. They found 79 documents hidden in Savedoff's laptop case in a locker, several of them having been signed out by Landau. According to Landau's plea agreement, from December 2010 through July 2011, Landau and Savedoff stole documents from numerous institutions, including the Maryland Historical Society, the Historical Society of Pennsylvania, the Connecticut Historical Society, the University of Vermont, the New York Historical Society, and the Franklin D. Roosevelt Presidential Library, a component of the National Archives.

Papers on file in federal court in Maryland show that the FBI also recovered documents stolen from historical societies or museums in Connecticut and Vermont. In total, more than ten thousand items were taken. Their worth has been estimated as high as US$ 2.5 million.

Items stolen included letters by Marie Antoinette, Napoleon Bonaparte, Benjamin Franklin, John Hancock, Francis Scott Key, Karl Marx, Thomas Paine, Edgar Allan Poe and George Washington. Seven signed 'reading copies' of speeches by President Franklin D. Roosevelt (the actual copies of the speeches Roosevelt read from, including his handwritten edits and additions) were also taken. These included the reading copy of Roosevelt's inaugural address. Landau sold four of these speeches to a collector for $35,000. All were recovered.

Landau and Savedoff were jailed in Baltimore and indicted by a federal grand jury in late July 2011. Landau was released with GPS monitoring. Savedoff surrendered his American and Canadian passports, and was released on $250,000 bail.

Both defendants pleaded guilty, Savedoff in October 2011 and Landau in February 2012. On June 27, 2012, Landau was sentenced to seven years in prison. He also had to pay restitution of $46,525 to dealers who had unwittingly purchased stolen documents from him.

== Return of documents ==
The rightful owners of all the stolen documents recovered have been identified. As of May 2013, only twenty percent of the documents have been returned to them, with the remainder to be returned in the following months.
