= Bellina Logan =

American television and film actress

- Born: Los Angeles, California, U.S.
- Occupation: Actress
- Years active: 1980–present

Bellina Logan is an American television and film actress.

== Career ==
Logan is known for her roles in such films and television shows as Interview with the Vampire, Twin Peaks and as Nurse Kit in ER and Janice Mayfield in the sitcom Daddio. She portrayed the recurring character of Fiona in Sons Of Anarchy.

In 2026, Bellina Logan presented the autobiographical Confessions of a Mulatto Love Child at the Edinburgh Fringe Festival.

== Filmography ==
=== Film ===
Year	Title	Role	Notes
1990	Blue Steel	Rookie #1	
1990	Wild at Heart	Beany Thorn	Scenes deleted
1990	Jacob's Ladder	Emergency Ward Nurse	
1994	Interview with the Vampire	Tavern Girl	
1997	Just Write	Tory	
1997	Picture Perfect	Ad Agency Receptionist	
2001	Daddy and Them	Liquor Store Girl #2	
2002	Bug	Sheila	
2004	Myron's Movie	Melinda	
2006	Inland Empire	Linda	
2007	Sunny & Share Love You	Kenny's Mom	

=== Television ===
Year	Title	Role	Notes
1980	Insight	Maria Costa	Episode: "Who Loves Amy Tonight?"
1989	A Man Called Hawk	Asha	Episode: "Poison"
1990	Twin Peaks	Louie “Birdsong” Budway	Episode: "Laura's Secret Diary"
1991	Mimi & Me	Rula	Television film
1991	Law & Order	Gail Carradine	Episode: "Out of Control"
1992	On the Air	Woman With No Name	Episode #1.7
1995	One Life to Live	Robynn	Episode #1.6843
1995	Central Park West	Carolyn / Female Editor #1	5 episodes
1996–2008	ER	Nurse Kit	27 episodes
2000	Daddio	Janice Mayfield	14 episodes
2000, 2001	Family Law	Madeline Stivers	2 episodes
2004	Crossing Jordan	Mortician	Episode: "Justice Delayed"
2006	Girlfriends	Tamara Dukes	Episode: "It's Raining Men"
2009–2010	Sons of Anarchy	Fiona Larkin	7 episodes
2010	Numbers	Lawyer	Episode: "Scratch"
2010	Hawthorne	Dr. Logan	2 episodes
2011	Medium	Miss Martin	Episode: "Labor Pains"
2011–2013	Enlightened	Tanya	4 episodes
2013	NCIS: Los Angeles	Nurse #1	Episode: "Ascension"
2014	Awkward	Dentist	Episode: "Listen to This"
2017	The Magicians	Nurse	Episode: "The Flying Forest"
2017	Famous in Love	Professor Sandra Hawkins	2 episodes
2017	Twin Peaks	Female Doctor	Episode: "Part 16"
2017, 2018	Midnight, Texas	Aunt Mildred	2 episodes
2018	American Vandal	Detective Carla Dickey	6 episodes
2019	Better Things	Mrs. Fornges	Episode: "Holding"
2019	Big Little Lies	Mindy	Episode: "Kill Me"
2020	NCIS	Commander Roberta Stock	Episode: "Blarney"
2024–2025	Palm Royale	Rita	Recurring role
