= Charles F. Mayer (railroad president) =

American rail executive and businessman

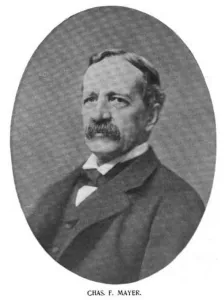
- Photographed around 1898
- Born: Charles Frederick Mayer; November 30, 1826
- Died: February 4, 1904 (aged 77); Baltimore, Maryland, U.S.
- Resting place: Green Mount Cemetery
- Occupation: Businessman
- Employer: Baltimore & Ohio Railroad
- Spouse: Susan Keim
- Relatives: Charles F. Mayer (uncle)

Charles Frederick Mayer (November 30, 1826 – February 24, 1904) was an American rail executive and businessman from Baltimore, Maryland, who served as the 10th president of the Baltimore and Ohio Railroad (B&O) from 1889 to 1896.

== Early life ==
Born on November 20, 1826, to a well-known family, Charles Frederick Mayer was the sixth child of Lewis Mayer, a lawyer, and Lewis' cousin and wife, Susan Mayer. His uncle and namesake, Charles F. Mayer, was a Maryland state senator, prominent figure in Baltimore, and a founder of a predecessor line of the Philadelphia, Wilmington & Baltimore Railroad.

Mayer was privately educated in Baltimore and traveled abroad as a youth, before beginning work for his uncle Frederick Koenig. Showing "uncommon aptitude for commercial life", as a later biographer wrote, Mayer was dispatched to the west coast of South America on a trading voyage of two years, before returning to Baltimore. On December 4, 1866, Mayer married his cousin, Susan Keim, who was the daughter of Congressman George M. Keim. They had no children.

== Career ==
Mayer became president of the Consolidation Coal Company of Maryland in 1877. In 1887, he became a member of the board of directors of B&O, and in 1889, succeeded Samuel Spencer as its president. Mayer served as president for seven years, playing a key role in the construction of the Baltimore Belt Line. He recruited young engineer Samuel Rea to design the line, and personally chose the Saxony royal blue color that became the signature of the line's premier Royal Blue rail service. Mayer also succeeded in separating the railroad from partial political control by the City of Baltimore and the State of Maryland, convincing them to sell their stock in the company in 1890. However, the railroad suffered from financial issues during his tenure, and Mayer resigned in 1896. He was replaced by the company's general counsel, John K. Cohen.

A flattering biographical sketch of Mayer in an 1898 Baltimore publication described him thus:

The private life of Mr. Mayer exemplifies the man of faithful and unwavering friendship, who has helped many one to a higher destiny. His benevolence is proverbial, and many are the benefits he quietly and unostentatiously confers.

— Clarence H. Forrest

A member of Baltimore society, Mayer served on many charitable and educational boards and trusts, including those of Johns Hopkins University, the Western National Bank, and the Baltimore Steam Packet Company. A brother of the Masonic Order, Mayer also was a member of a number of clubs in Baltimore, such as the Merchants' Club, the Maryland Club, and the University Club.

== Personal life ==
Mayer died on February 24, 1904, at his home on West Monument Street in Baltimore. He was buried in Green Mount Cemetery.
