= Maryland Club =

Private social club in Baltimore, Maryland, United States

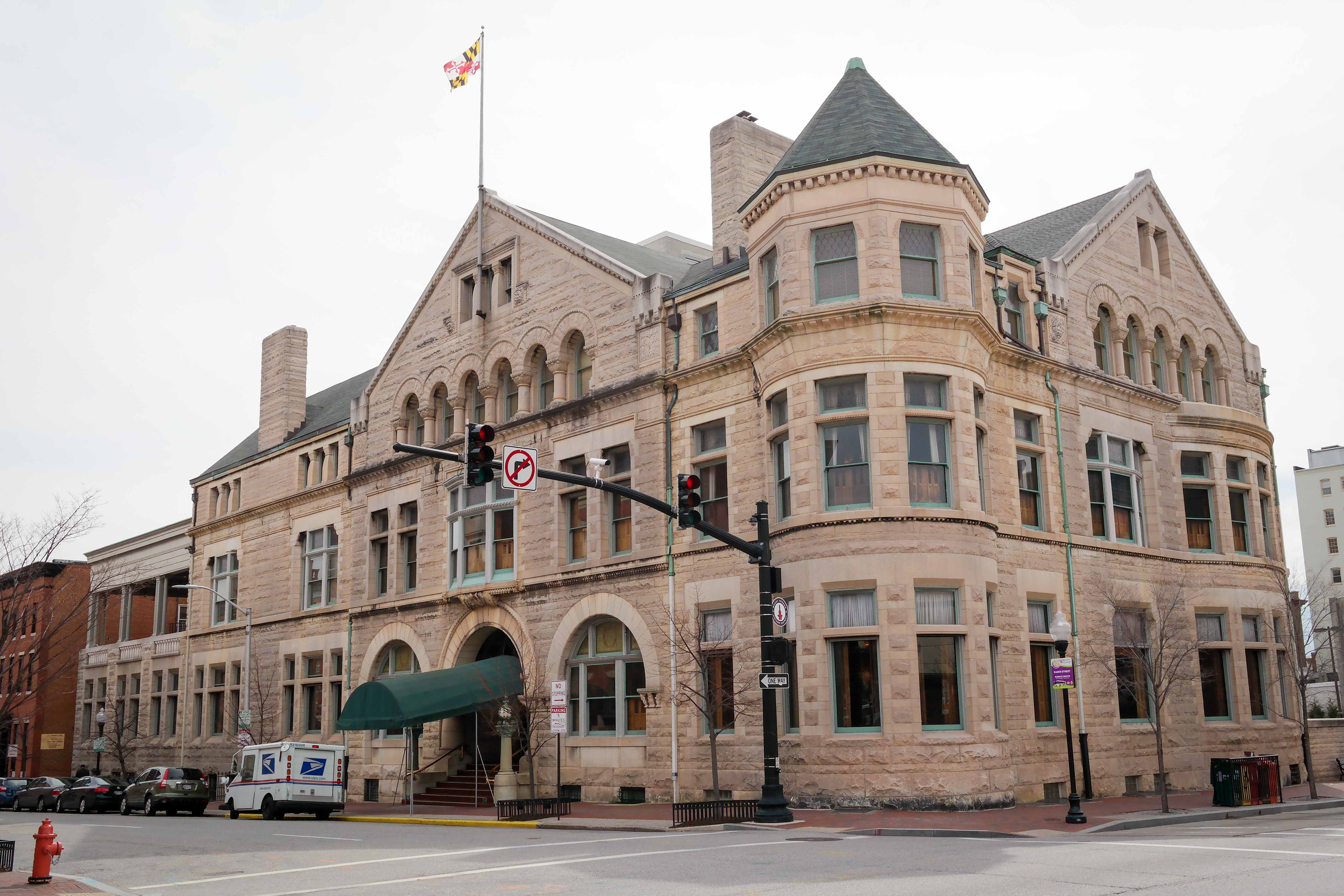
- A view of the Maryland Club in Baltimore
- Formation: 1857
- Location: Baltimore, Maryland
- Website: www.marylandclub1857.org
- The Maryland Club
- U.S. National Register of Historic Places
- Location within Baltimore Location within Maryland Location within the United States
- Location: 1 East Eager St. Baltimore, Maryland
- Coordinates: 39°18′04″N 76°36′56″W
- Area: Less than one acre
- Built: 1891
- Architect: Josias Pennington
- NRHP reference No.: 100009814
- Added to NRHP: January 29, 2024

The Maryland Club is a private social club in Baltimore, Maryland. Founded in 1857 as an exclusive men's club, it is today one of the oldest surviving such clubs. Its 1891 Romanesque clubhouse, located at 1 East Eager Street in the Mount Vernon neighborhood, was listed on the National Register of Historic Places in 2024.

The Club’s members have traditionally been among the region’s prominent business, professional, civic and nonprofit leaders. Membership is by invitation only. The Club's website says it accepts a diverse membership of outstanding individuals regardless of race, gender, religion, ethnicity or sexual orientation.

In 1861, the Club supported the secession of the Confederate States of America. The Club was closed by Union troops during the American Civil War. General Lew Wallace outraged local residents by turning the clubhouse building into a shelter for homeless former slaves. The Club re-opened after the war. The Club opposed Prohibition and flouted the law through the use of private lockers. After a 1995 fire nearly destroyed its building, the Club restored its architectural and aesthetic elements. In 2019, a major renovation added squash facilities, improved the exercise area, added a bistro-style restaurant, and made other system upgrades.

In 1988, the Club began accepting Jewish members. In 2021, the Club began admitting women as members through its regular admission process. Women have since been elected to the formerly all-male Board of Governors of the Club.

The club operates under laws for 501(c)(7) Social and Recreation Clubs; in 2025 it claimed total revenue of $5,855,267 and total assets of $16,829,122. The separate Maryland Club Preservation Foundation is a 501(c)(3) Public Charity; in 2025 it claimed total revenue of $138,149 and total assets of $444,576.

== Notable members ==
- Jérôme Napoléon Bonaparte, the first president of the club
- William Cabell Bruce
- Charles W. Field
- Charles F. Mayer
- Charles F. Mayer (railroad president), nephew of the above
- 45th governor of the State of Maryland, Edwin Warfield
- James T. Woodward
- Glenn L. Martin

== See also ==
- Knickerbocker Club
- Metropolitan Club
- Union Club of the City of New York
