= Ginger Ale Afternoon =

1989 film by Rafal Zielinski

- Directed by: Rafal Zielinski
- Written by: Gina Wendkos
- Produced by: Susan Shapiro; Rafal Zielinski
- Starring: Dana Andersen
- Cinematography: Yuri Neyman
- Music by: Willie Dixon
- Release date: 1989
- Language: English

Ginger Ale Afternoon is a 1989 independent film by director Rafal Zielinski, based on a stage play by Gina Wendkos.

== Plot summary ==
A man and his pregnant wife, played by Dana Andersen, live in a trailer park. The wife discovers that the husband has been spending time with their young neighbor. The young neighbor is played by Yeardley Smith, who is best known as the voice of Lisa Simpson.

== Cast ==
- Dana Andersen as Jesse Mickers
- John M. Jackson as Hank Mickers
- Yeardley Smith as Bonnie Cleator

== Awards ==
The soundtrack, by Willie Dixon, was nominated for a Grammy.

The film was nominated for the Grand Jury Prize at the 1989 Sundance Film Festival.

== Cultural references ==
The 1992 album Hit to Death in the Future Head by American alternative rock band The Flaming Lips includes a song called Gingerale Afternoon (The Astrology of a Saturday).
