= Francis Blackwell Mayer =

American painter (1827–1899)

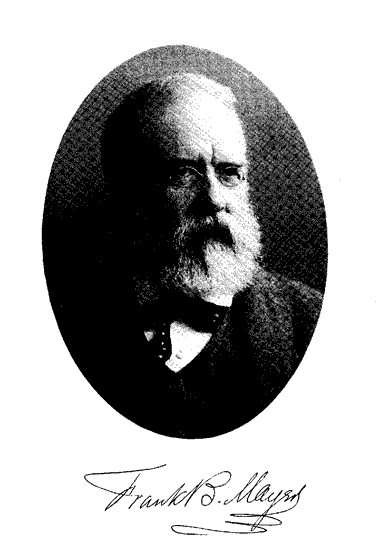
Frank Blackwell Mayer

Francis Blackwell Mayer (December 27, 1827 – December 5, 1899) was a prominent 19th-century American genre painter from Maryland. While he spent most of his life in that state, he took a trip to the western frontier in the mid-nineteenth century and executed a series of drawings of Native Americans; he also studied in Paris for five years in the 1860s.

Primarily known for his oil paintings and watercolors, he also worked in other media, including pen and crayon drawings, engraving, and illustrating. Many of his work have historic themes.

== Early life and education ==
Francis (Frank) Blackwell Mayer was born in Baltimore, Maryland, on December 27, 1827, the son of Charles Mayer (1795-1864) and Eliza Blackwell Mayer (1803–1885). He was one of three sons, Henry Christian Mayer (1821–1846), the son of his father with his first wife, and Alfred M. Mayer, who became a noted physicist, being the other two. An uncle, Brantz Mayer, was a noted author.

Frank Blackwell Mayer studied art in Baltimore with Alfred Jacob Miller and Ernest Fischer in the 1840s and in Paris with Charles Gleyre and Gustave Brion between 1864 and 1869, specializing in oil paintings and crayon drawings. He lived in Paris from 1862 to 1870, where his artwork was exhibited at annual expositions in both London and Paris.

== Early career ==
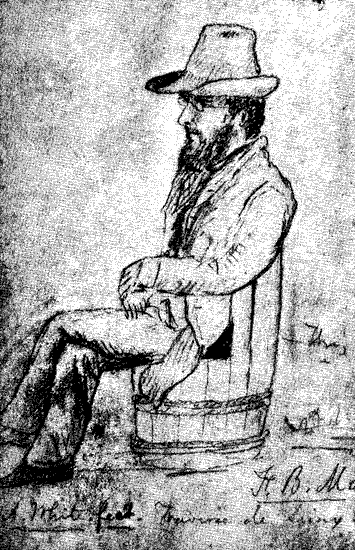
Frank Blackwell Mayer in 1851, drawing by Ashton White

Frank B. Mayer began his work to form the Maryland Art Association on March 14, 1847 and the association met in his studio once a week. He went on to work as an engraver in Philadelphia in 1847 and in 1848 served as the assistant librarian for the Gallery of Fine Arts at the Maryland Historical Society, which his uncle author Brantz Mayer, was heavily involved with, both in its founding and as president. He also made illustrations for his uncle’s books on Mexico. Mayer went on to form the Allston Association with friends for the appreciation of American Artists. Its constitution outlined the usual club regulations and allowed ladies as auxiliary members and outlined the plans for art exhibitions and for assistance given to native artists. He also served on the club’s Board of Directors.

In May 1851, Mayer travelled to Minnesota Territory and observed the signing of the Treaty of Traverse des Sioux. He wrote extensive journals and made pen and ink drawings of his experiences in the west. This experience was the influence for one of his most famous paintings, “Treaty of Traverse des Sioux, Minnesota” from 1886. Upon his return to Maryland, ten of his watercolors were exhibited by the Artist’s Association of Baltimore at the Maryland Historical Society in 1856.

== Artistic career ==
After his education in Europe, Mayer received a medal and diploma from the Maryland Institute for his works “Continental” and “Attic Philosopher.” Upon his return to the United States, he settled in Annapolis, Maryland, and resided on Market Street while keeping a studio on Prince George Street. His work included historical paintings, two of which were bought by the State of Maryland and hang in the Maryland State House, The Burning of the Peggy Stewart, and the Planting of the First Colony in Maryland. Additional artwork by Mayer such as the well-known Annapolis in 1750 was done for private individuals, the Peabody Institute, and the U.S. government.

In 1891, Mayer was commissioned by the Baltimore and Ohio Railroad to paint The Founders of the Baltimore and Ohio Railroad, representing the railroad's history from its founding in 1827 to 1880. It was displayed at the B&O's headquarters in Baltimore for much of the 20th century. The original painting is now at the headquarters of CSX Transportation in Jacksonville, Florida, the successor railroad to the B&O. A replica is on public display at the B&O Railroad Museum in Baltimore.

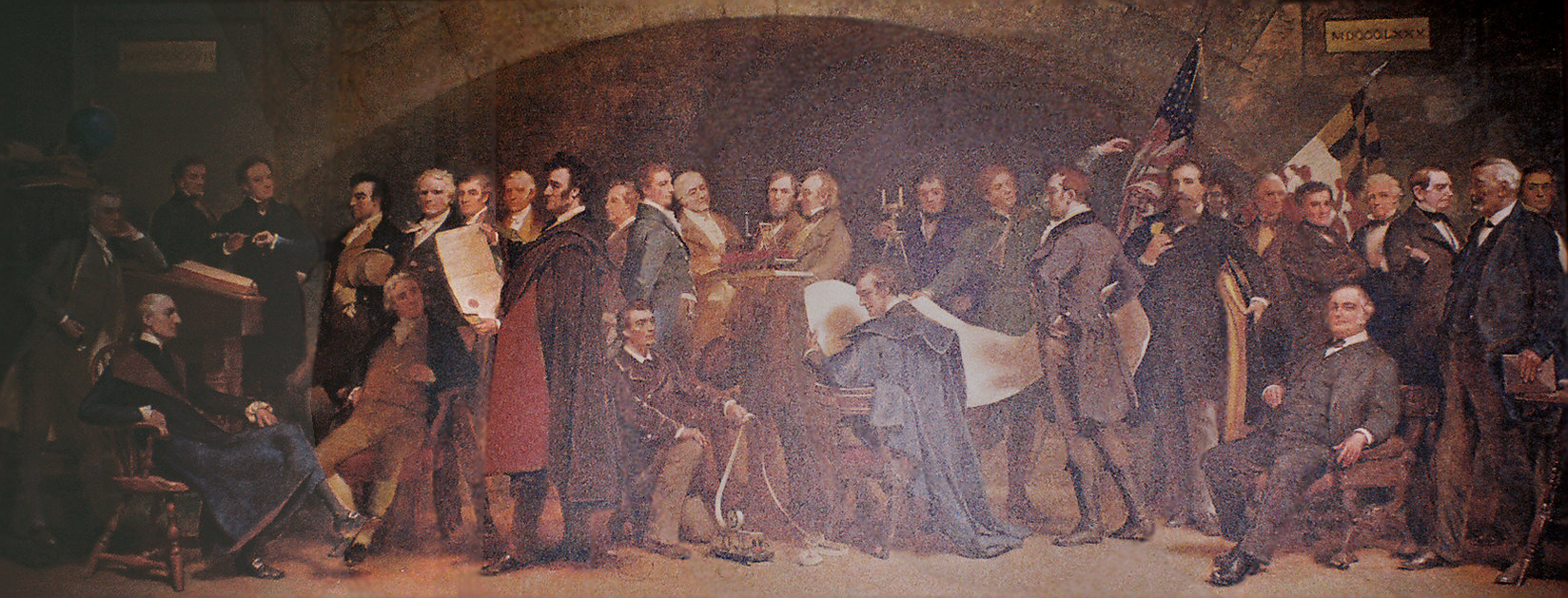
Francis Blackwell Mayer. The Founders of the Baltimore and Ohio Railroad (1891)

== Life in Annapolis ==
In 1876, Mayer purchased a home in historic Annapolis and took an active interest in the city’s improvement. In 1884, Mayer helped found the Local Improvement Association of Annapolis. Mayer was active in landscaping public areas of the city such as the circle around Market Space. He was later a member of the building committee of a new public school and was interested in architecture as well as the history of Annapolis. He conducted research on the "customs and characters" of Annapolis that later formed the basis for a chapter in Elihu S. Riley's The Ancient City: A History of Annapolis, in Maryland 1649-1887 (Annapolis: Record Printing Office, 1887).

== Maryland State House ==
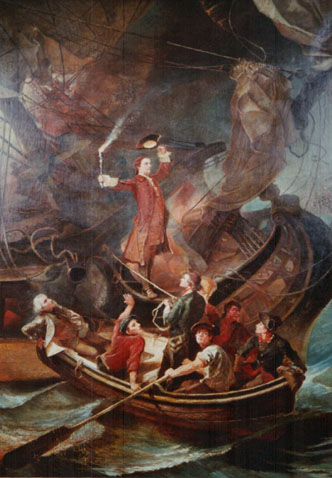
The Burning of the Peggy Stewart (1886)

Mayer was also involved in improving the Maryland State House grounds in Annapolis. In 1882, he designed a number of changes to the fencing and walkways that were made on the State House grounds. Evidence suggests that Mayer may also have designed the porch for the State House that was contracted in July 1882, since an unsuccessful bid for the construction of the porch submitted by C.C. Woolley refers to Mayer's plan for the work (Notes by Edward C. Papenfuse, Maryland State Archivist). In 1884, he wrote a six-page letter to the Senator from Charles County, Dr. F.W. Lancaster, the chairman of the Committee for Public Buildings. In this letter, he requested permission to submit a report to the Committee regarding potential improvements or additions to the State House. He also argued that the original design of the State House represented a pinnacle of architecture and that style must be strictly adhered to in future improvements. “The restoration of this room [the Senate Chamber] to its original appearance is an obligation of duty we owe to ourselves and to the country. The mutilation of this hall is looked upon by all visitors as an act of vandalism and tends to bring our historical renown as one of the ‘original thirteen’ into contempt. I would respectfully suggest the restoration of this room as nearly as possible to its original appearance to be preserved in this condition. . .”

By the mid-1890s, the inside of the State House was also sorely in need of restorative work. It had fallen into such disrepair that wooden timbers were rotting, ceilings were sagging in places, and some of the walls were plastered over. On February 2, 1894, the Maryland State Senate requested that Mayer team up with Baltimore architect John Appleton Wilson to conduct a study of the feasibility of restoring the Old Senate Chamber to the condition it had been in when George Washington resigned his commission as commander-in-chief of the Continental Army in 1783. After six weeks of working without pay, Mayer and Wilson reported back to the Senate on March 19, 1894. Their report listed items to be repaired, replaced or reproduced and estimated the total cost to be $6,150. They concluded their report with a recommendation that the work be started immediately. It was not until about eleven years later under Governor Edwin Warfield's leadership that Mayer and Wilson's recommendations were carried out and the Old Senate Chamber was fully restored to a satisfactory condition. Mayer expressed frustration over the legislature’s inaction on the State House, saying in a letter to his agent, John G. Hopkins, that “They went back on me Completely in the State House Annex affairs and chose a very ordinary design in preference to a really beautiful and artistic plan. . . Evidently it was all preordained and shameless.”(Mayer to Hopkins, 20 July 1886).

== Personal life and death ==
Mayer did not take a wife until he was 55 years old, when on February 12, 1883, he married the 27-year-old widow Ellen (or Ella) Benton Brewer. Mayer did not mention any children in his last will and testament of 1896, nor were there any children living at the time of Mayer's death in Annapolis on July 28, 1899. Mayer's body was interred at the Annapolis City Cemetery.

== Significant works ==
- Feast of Mondawmin
- Doing and Dreaming
- The Nineteenth Century
- Annapolis in 1750
- Talking Business in 1750
- Crowning a Troubadour
- Treaty of Traverse des Sioux, Minnesota
- The Planting of the Colony of Maryland
- The Burning of the Peggy Stewart
- Waiting Orders
- The Thunder Dance

== Sources ==
- Breeskin, Adelyn Dohme. Catalogue of the Paintings in the State House at Annapolis, Maryland. By Order of Governor Albert C. Ritchie. Annapolis: 1934.
- Journal of the Proceedings of the Senate of Maryland, January Session, 1894. Annapolis: King Brothers, State Printers, 1894. “Report to the Senate on the feasibility of restoring the Old Senate Chamber”, pp. 623–625.
- Legislative History Department. Maryland's State Buildings and History of Her Art Treasures. Annapolis: n.pub., 1903.
- Mayer, Frank Blackwell. With Pen and Paper on the Frontier in 1851: The Diary and Sketches of Frank Blackwell Mayer. Minnesota Historical Society, St. Paul (1932, 1986). ISBN 0-87351-195-6
- Maryland State Archives
- Page, Jean Jepson, “Notes on the Contributions of Francis Blackwell Mayer and his Family to the Cultural History of Maryland,” Maryland Historical Magazine, Vol. 76, No. 3 (Fall 1981), 217-239.
- Radoff, Morris L. The State House at Annapolis. Annapolis: The Hall of Records Commission, 1972.
- Riley, Elihu S. The Ancient City: A History of Annapolis, in Maryland 1649-1887. Annapolis: Record Printing Office, 1887.
- Society of Colonial Wars in the State of Maryland. The Maryland State House: A Memorial to John Appleton Wilson. Baltimore: Press of John S. Bridges & Co., 1931.
- Sutro, Ottilie, “The Wednesday Club: A Brief Sketch from Authentic Sources,” Maryland Historical Magazine, Vol. 38, (1943), 60-68
