= Just Write =

- Directed by: Andrew Gallerani
- Written by: Stan Williamson
- Produced by: Heath McLaughlin
- Starring: Sherilyn Fenn; Jeremy Piven; JoBeth Williams; Wallace Shawn; Alex Rocco
- Cinematography: Michael A. Brown
- Edited by: Laura M. Grody
- Music by: Leland Bond
- Production companies: Wind Chill Entertainment; BMG Independents
- Distributed by: Heartland Film Releasing
- Release date: March 1997
- Running time: 102 minutes
- Country: United States
- Language: English

Just Write is a 1997 American romantic comedy film directed by Andrew Gallerani starring Jeremy Piven, Sherilyn Fenn, JoBeth Williams and Wallace Shawn.

== Plot ==
Harold McMurphy (Piven) is a single, 30-year-old, Hollywood-obsessed tour bus driver in Beverly Hills who works for his father's struggling tour company. He dreams of finding a perfect woman that will love him for who he is, despite his father's insistence that he lower his standards.

When two women from a tour ask Harold where they can see Hollywood stars, he directs them to a trendy Hollywood cafe where his best friend, Danny (Jeffrey D. Sams), is a bartender. Harold goes to meet them and overhears a conversation in which a man hits on a woman by telling her that he is a writer represented by Arthur Blake (Shawn). Harold then spots up-and-coming actress Amanda Clark (Fenn) arguing with her agent, Sidney Stone (Williams). Danny encourages Harold to ask Amanda for an autograph. She greets him warmly and asks what he does. He lies and tells her that he is a writer represented by Arthur Blake. Amanda asks for his feedback on a screenplay for a movie she is cast in.

Danny encourages Harold to pursue Amanda romantically, even though she has a movie-star boyfriend, Rich Adams (Costas Mandylor). Harold meets with Amanda to discuss the script and is the only person who sees the same problems with the screenplay that she sees. Amanda takes Harold to a party filled with stars and elites so they can confront Sidney with Harold's opinion of the script. After Sidney dismisses them both, Amanda catches Rich with another woman.

Rich and Sidney set out to stop Harold's budding relationship with Amanda before it embarrasses them both. Meanwhile, Harold's father decides to set him up with an "interesting-looking" psychic named Lulu (Yeardley Smith).

After escaping from Lulu, Harold takes Amanda on a date to a local fair. At the end of their date, Amanda tells Harold that she's arranged for him to rewrite the screenplay, telling Harold that Sidney will call Arther Blake the next day to finalize the details and set the pay. Harold tries to tell Amanda the truth about himself, but can't bring himself to. The next morning, Harold sneaks into Arthur Blake's office and explains the whole situation. Arthur Blake advises Harold to "just write". Despite knowing nothing about writing, Harold buys a stack of books on screenwriting and dedicates himself to rewriting the screenplay. His father convinces him that the key to being a great writer is to be a great drinker, and encourages him to go find a bar and get drunk.

Meanwhile, Amanda realizes she's falling for Harold and begins digging for information about him. Nobody knows anything about him. She calls the tour company looking for him. Harold's father answers, thinking he's talking to Lulu, and tells her to forget about Harold because he's only interested in Hollywood floozies.

Amanda then finds Harold at the bar where they first met, drunk and surrounded by giggling women. She confronts Harold about his obsession with floozies and ends their relationship. He tries, again, to tell her the truth, but she drives away before he can finish explaining it. Dejected, Harold goes back home and finishes rewriting the script. Assuming that his screenwriting career is over before it began, Harold goes back to driving the tour bus.

Harold's father finds out that Amanda accused him of being obsessed with floozies and realizes that he is the reason they broke up. He goes to Amanda's home to explain the mix-up and fix her relationship with Harold.

While driving the tour bus, Harold sees Rich with a bouquet of flowers and realizes that he is on his way to see Amanda. Harold races with Rich to get to Amanda's house first so he can finally explain why he lied about being a writer. Harold arrives at Amanda's house and she tells him that his father already explained everything. She also tells him that she loved the script, except for one thing. She asks if he's ever been in love, because the hero in the movie doesn't respond like a man in love. Then they kiss, serenaded by applause by customers on the tour bus.

== Cast ==
- Sherilyn Fenn as Amanda Clark
- Jeremy Piven as Harold McMurphy
- JoBeth Williams as Sidney Stone
- Wallace Shawn as Arthur Blake
- Alex Rocco as Mr. McMurphy
- Jeffrey D. Sams as Danny
- Costas Mandylor as Rich Adams
- Yeardley Smith as Lulu
- Holland Taylor as Emma Jeffreys
- Anita Barone as Carrie
- Bellina Logan as Tory
- Stephanie Miller as Blake's Assistant
- Nancy McKeon as Bride
- Ed McMahon as Luncheon Chairman
- Todd Susman as Priest
- Kristin Dattilo as Tourist
- Fred Olen Ray as Mandalay Man
- Dorian Gregory as Valet
- John Fleck as Bum
- Lou Cutell as Luncheon Guest
- Barbara Perry as Mildred
- Josh Keaton as Trolley Teenager
- Mary-Pat Green as Mother
- Jay Leno as Himself

== Awards and nominations ==
Marco Island Film Festival:

- 1998: Won, "Audience Award for Best Feature Comedy" - Andrew Gallerani.

Santa Barbara International Film Festival:

- 1997: Won, "Best Independent Award" - Andrew Gallerani.

Santa Clara International Film Festival:

- 1998: Won, "Best Feature Comedy Film" - Heath McLaughlin.

Temecula Valley International Film Festival:

- 1997: Won, "Viewer's Choice Award" - Andrew Gallerani.
