= Charles F. Mayer =

American politician (1795–1864)

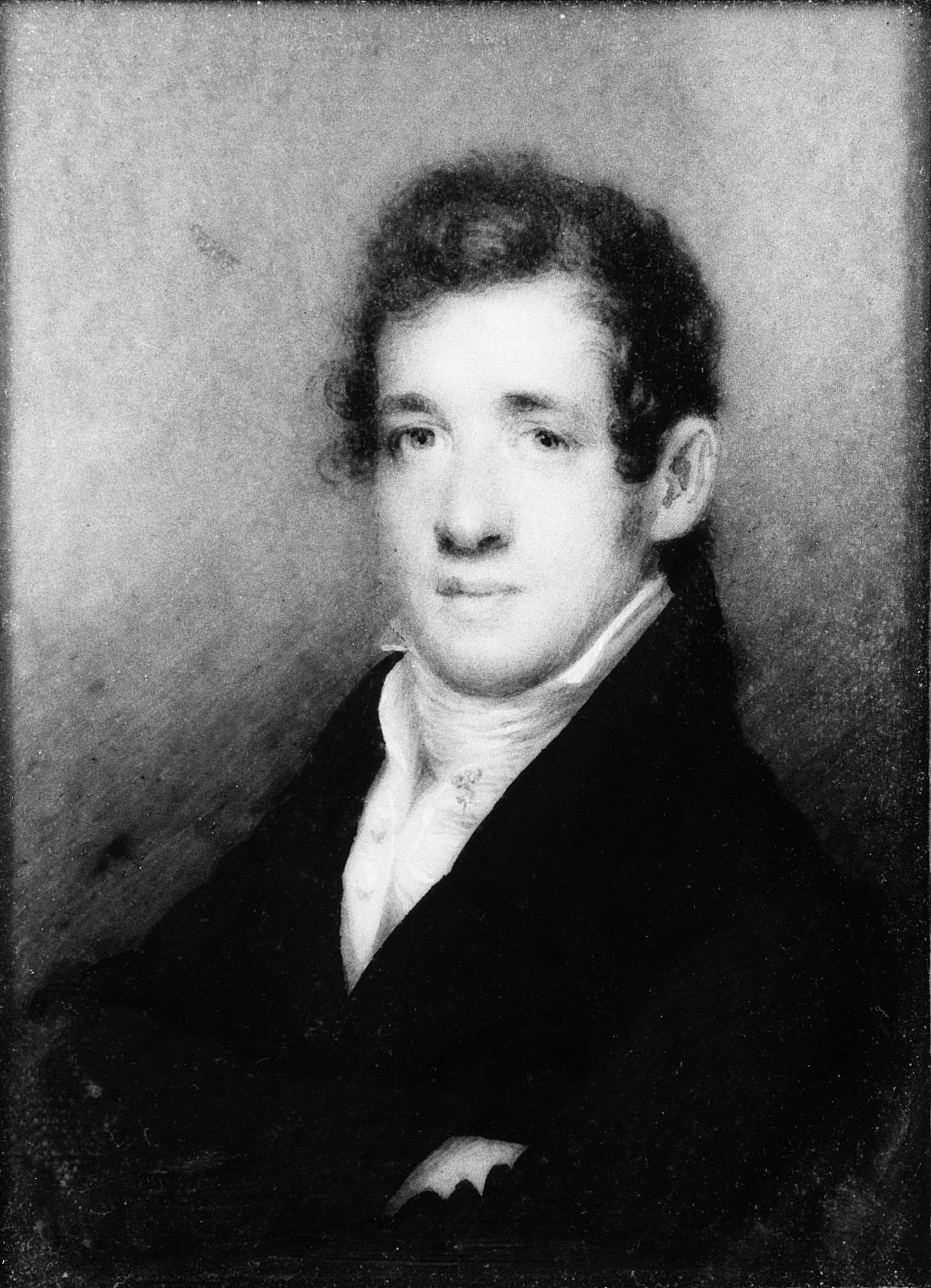
Charles Frederick Mayer (ca. 1815–20)

Charles Frederick Mayer (October 15, 1795 - January 3, 1864) was an American lawyer, Maryland state senator, and railroad director.

== Early life ==
Mayer was born in Baltimore on October 15, 1795, to Christian Mayer, who emigrated from Germany to Baltimore in 1784. Charles' younger brother, Brantz Mayer (1809-1879), would become a diplomat like their father; in 1844, he founded the Maryland Historical Society. Another brother, Lewis Mayer, was a pioneer in anthracite mining and the father of Charles F. Mayer (ca. 1834–1904), the 10th president of the B&O.

Charles attended Dickinson College and later became a trustee.

== Career ==
Wealthy by inheritance, Christian Mayer came to Baltimore as the representative of a large Amsterdam merchant house. In America, he increased his fortune as an East Indies ship owner and merchant, and also served his home country for five decades as Consul General of Württemberg.

Returning to his home city, he became a leading light in its intellectual life: "His house was a center for all that was intellectual and cultured in the Baltimore of those days".

=== Political career ===
In 1830, he was elected a Maryland state senator from Baltimore City. In 1833, as the chairman of a joint committee of the legislative house, he helped produce the "Report relative to the plans of operation of the Chesapeake and Ohio Canal Company and the Baltimore and Ohio Railroad Company." His efforts helped settle a dispute between the C&O and B&O and thereby helped ensure Baltimore's access to western markets.

=== Later career ===
In 1838, he was a director of the Baltimore and Port Deposit Railroad, whose president was Lewis Brantz, his father's business partner. The B&PD, along with three other railroads, built the first rail link from Philadelphia to Baltimore. The firms merged in 1838 into the Philadelphia, Wilmington, and Baltimore Railroad, and Mayer stayed on as director. His service as an early railroad executive is noted on the 1839 Newkirk Viaduct Monument.

== Personal life ==
Mayer married and had a son:

- Henry Christian Mayer (1821–1846)

He married again, to Eliza C. Mayer (Aug. 26, 1803-June 28, 1885), and their children included:

- Francis Blackwell Mayer (1827-1899), who became a painter
- Alfred M. Mayer (1836-1897), who became a physicist after Joseph Henry, the director of the new Smithsonian Institution paid Mayer a visit; he was shown Alfred's various scientific apparatuses, and later helped the boy begin his career in science.
- Eliza Mayer van Kleeck (1844-1920), the mother of social worker and labor activist Mary van Kleeck.

Mayer died on January 3, 1864, at his Franklin street home in Baltimore. He was buried in Baltimore's Green Mount Cemetery.

=== Interests and clubs ===
He was a member of the Maryland Club and helped found the "Baltimore House of Refuge."
