= A. Hyatt Mayor =

American art historian and curator (1901–1980)

Alpheus Hyatt Mayor (1901–1980) was an American art historian and curator at the Metropolitan Museum of Art, a leading figure in the study of prints, both old master prints and popular prints.

== Biography ==
=== Early life ===
A. Hyatt Mayor's father was marine biologist Alfred Goldsborough Mayor (1868–1922) and his mother was artist and sculptor Harriet Randolph Hyatt Mayor. His grandfather, whose name he carried, was the paleontologist Alpheus Hyatt. Mayor came from an artistic family; his mother's sister was the sculptor Anna Hyatt Huntington, and her husband was art patron Archer Milton Huntington, founder of the Hispanic Society of America in 1904.

Mayor received his B.A. from Princeton University (1922) and then received a Rhodes scholarship, which he used to earn his second bachelor's degree at Christ Church, Oxford in 1926. The next few years he spent in Florence, Italy and at the American School of Classical Studies. Upon returning to the United States he embarked on a literary career, working on Hound & Horn.

=== Metropolitan Museum of Art ===
He married Virginia Sluder in 1932 and then joined the Department of Prints at the Metropolitan Museum of Art, New York, becoming curator of the department in 1946. He had to follow the massive figure of William Ivins, Jr., whose curatorship had lasted 30 years.

His tenure was marked by significant acquisitions of engravings, woodcuts, and other printed material, some by then-unknown artists who proved later to be eminently collectible. Many European collections became available after World War II, and there were notable acquisitions, especially from the collection of the Prince of Lichtenstein. He also expanded which types of types of printed ephemera were considered worthy of collection to include postcards, baseball cards and advertisements. He accepted the Jefferson Burdick collection at the Met, which included 300,000 items of American prints and memorabilia. In 1952 he published Prints and People: A Social History of Printed Pictures, which has remained continuously in print.

In 2016, the Metropolitan Museum of Art celebrated the centenary of the founding of its Department of Prints with The Power of Prints: The Legacy of William M. Ivins and A. Hyatt Mayor. The exhibit explored the breath and depth of the collection created by Ivins and Mayor. The exhibit was accompanied by a catalog of the same name by Freyda Spira and Peter Parshall.

=== Later life and publications ===
Mayor gave the A.S.W. Rosenbach Lectures in Bibliography in 1965.

In 1966 he retired from the Museum as curator emeritus and directed his efforts to various art-related projects and writings, in particular his translation and updating of the catalogues of Max Lehrs and the initiation, with Anthony Blunt and others, of the massive and still ongoing Illustrated Bartsch series of print catalogues. In 1955 he had succeeded his uncle Archer as president of the Hispanic Society of America, and he continued to serve until his death. He also served as a trustee of the American Federation of Arts and of Brookgreen Gardens in South Carolina. He was awarded a Boston Museum Award in 1971.

Among other accolades he received, French poet St. John Perse once said that "Hyatt Mayor was the only American who spoke classic French in such a way that Diderot or Voltaire could have taken him for a Frenchman," and New York Times columnist John Russell called him "one of the most remarkable men who ever held a curatorial post."

Mayor died of pneumonia in 1980. His granddaughter is actress Yeardley Smith.

== Sources ==
- A. Hyatt Mayor in Dictionary of Art Historians
- Cummings, Paul. "An Interview with A. Hyatt Mayor." Archives of American Art Journal 18, no. 4 (1978): 2–19. Transcript available here .
- Russell, John. "An Ideal Curator Needs More than Just Expertise." New York Times, August 14, 1983. Available online here .
