= Annisquam, Massachusetts =

Neighborhood in Gloucester, Massachusetts, United States

Coordinates: 42°39′30″N 70°40′38″W

Annisquam is a waterfront village in the city of Gloucester in Essex County on the North Shore of Massachusetts, United States. It is a few miles across Cape Ann from downtown Gloucester.

== History ==
The name "Annisquam" comes from an Algonquian term meaning "top of the rock, containing <wanashque>, "on top of", and <-ompsk>, "rock". The first European settlement in Annisquam was established in 1631. In the late 19th-century, it was home to both granite quarrying and an artist colony, which attracted painters including George Loftus Noyes and Margaret Fitzhugh Browne. The colony came to be known as "Squam" in the 1890s, with William Lamb Picknell, Emil Carlsen, and Robert Vonnoh in residence and producing numerous works inspired by the seascape.

Annisquam is primarily a residential village. Its only businesses include a restaurant and marina, a small hotel, a real estate company, a library and the Annisquam Yacht Club, founded in 1896. Because of its small size, historic architecture and secluded geography, Annisquam remains a popular summer resort.

At the mouth of the Annisquam River on Ipswich Bay is Annisquam Harbor Light, perhaps the village's most historic edifice. The lighthouse has been in the same spot since 1801, having undergone significant repairs in 1850.

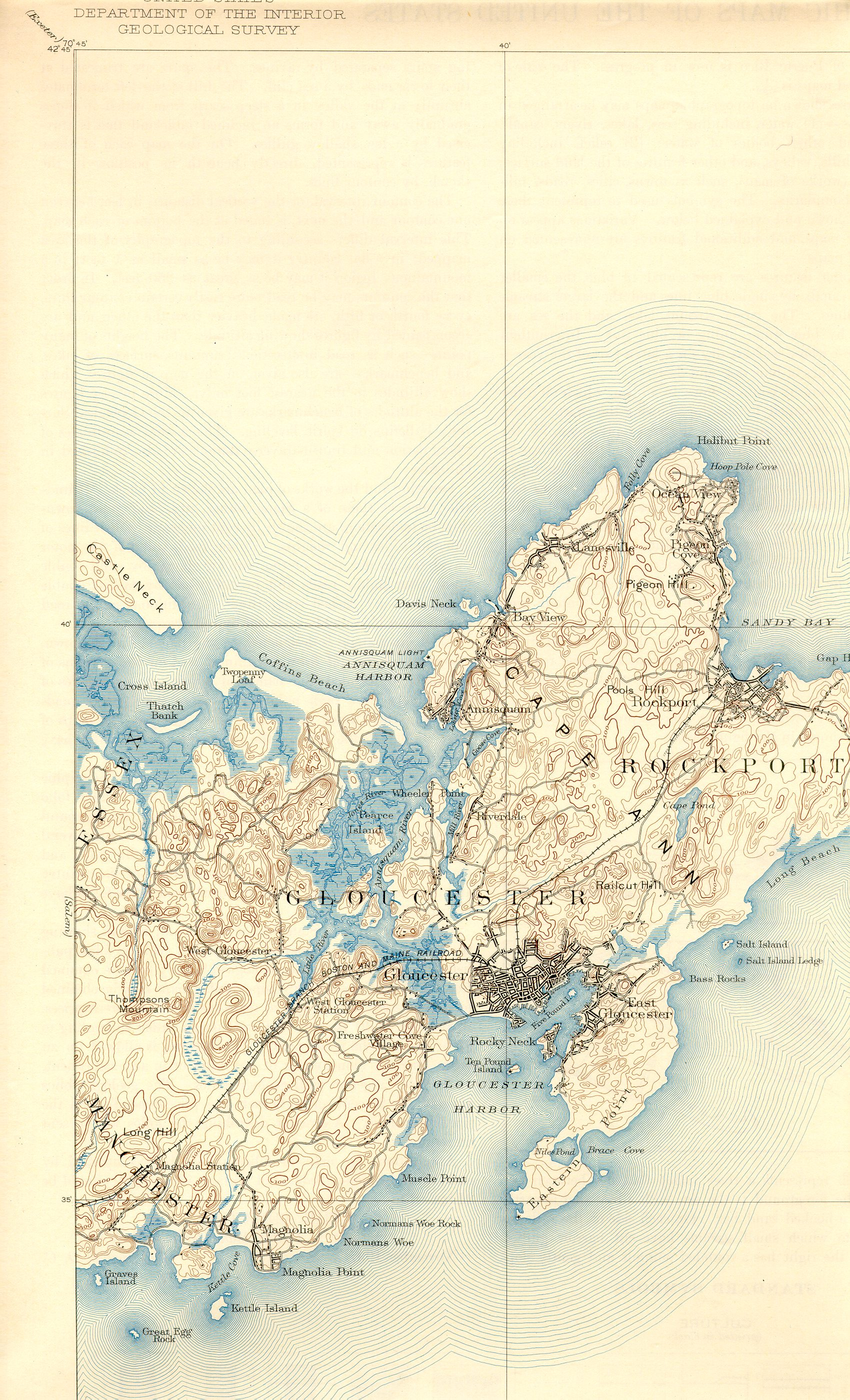
Annisquam's location on Cape Ann

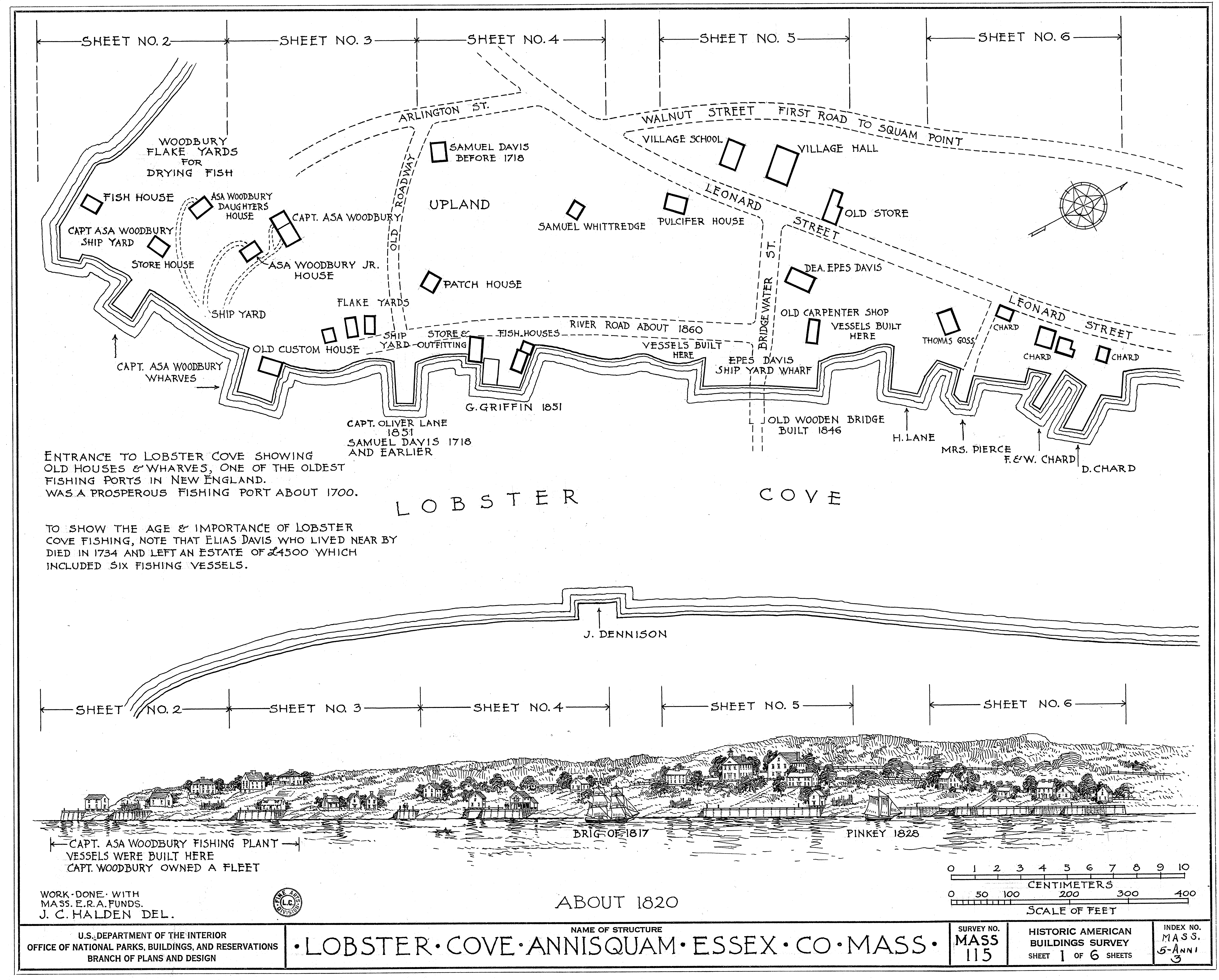
Lobster Cove c. 1820

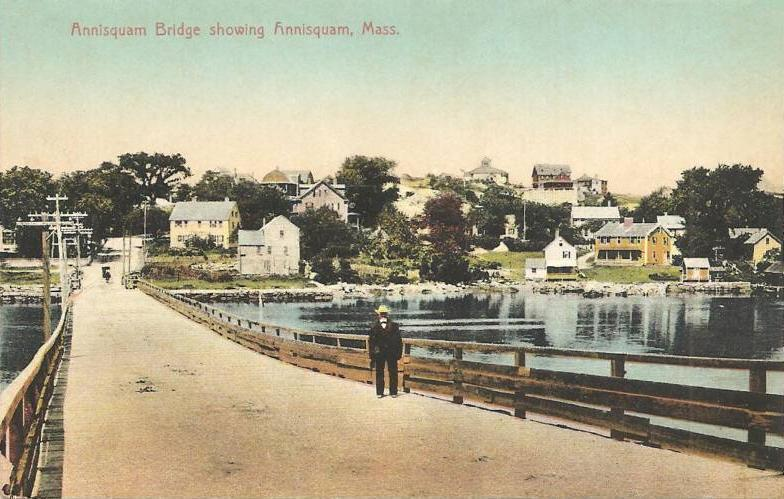
Annisquam Bridge in 1909

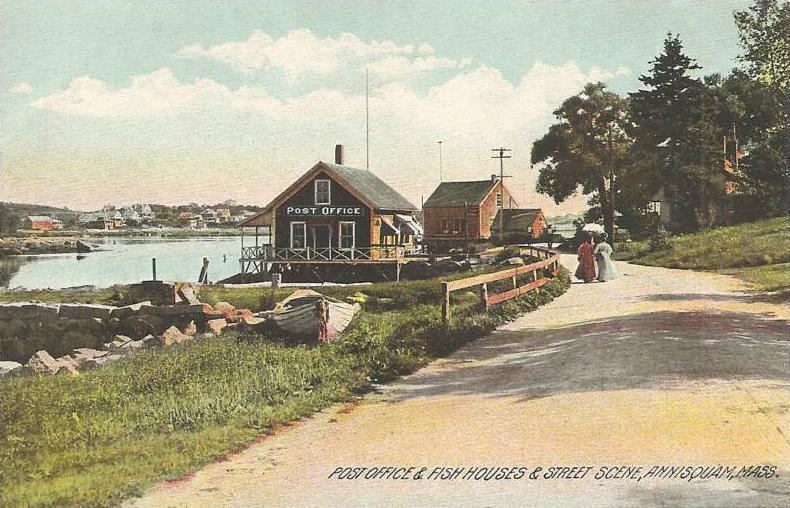
Street scene c. 1910

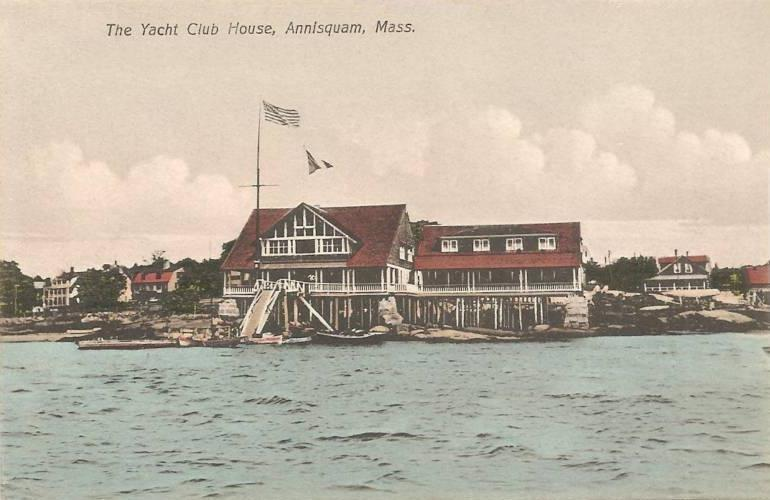
The yacht club in 1911

The Good Son, a 1993 movie starring Macaulay Culkin, was partly filmed here.

Marilyn Monroe is said to have secretly vacationed here, renting a cottage on Lobster Cove at which she was visited by John F. Kennedy, who was introduced to the area by his Harvard University roommate Benjamin A Smith II.

== Historic sites ==
- Annisquam Bridge
- Norwood-Hyatt House
