= Alfred M. Mayer =

American physicist

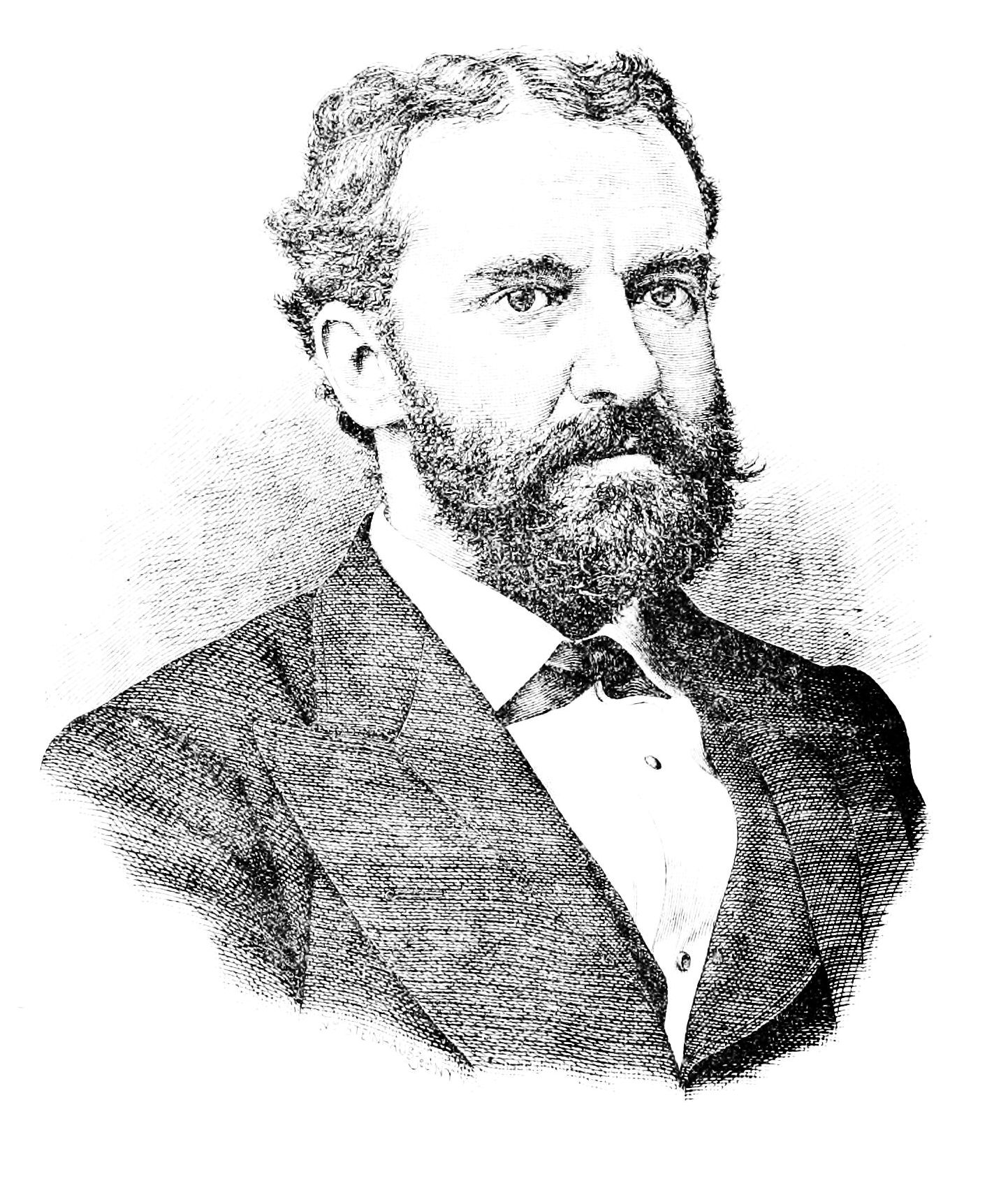

Signature
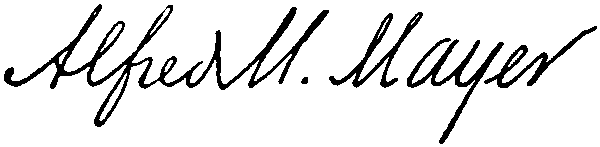

Alfred Marshall Mayer (born in Baltimore, Maryland, 13 November 1836; died in Maplewood, New Jersey, 13 July 1897) was an American physicist.

== Biography ==
He was born to Charles F. Mayer, a lawyer and state senator, and Eliza C. Mayer.

He attended St. Mary's College, but left for the workshop and drafting room of a mechanical engineer, where he remained two years, acquiring a knowledge of the use of tools, mechanical drawing, and methods of constructing machines. He then spent two years in obtaining a thorough knowledge of analytical chemistry by laboratory practice. In 1856 he was called to the chair of physics and chemistry in the University of Maryland, and from 1859 to 1861 he held a similar post in Westminster College, Missouri.

In 1863/4 he studied physics, mathematics, and physiology in the University of Paris, and on his return he filled successively chairs in Pennsylvania College, Gettysburg, and Lehigh University, Bethlehem, from 1865 to 1870. At Lehigh, he had charge of the department of astronomy, and superintended the erection of an observatory, from which he made a series of observations of Jupiter. He had charge of the expedition that was sent to Burlington, Iowa, under the auspices of the U.S. Nautical Almanac office to photograph the solar eclipse of 7 August 1869, and made 41 perfect photographs. He was elected as a member of the American Philosophical Society in 1869. In 1871 he accepted the professorship of physics in Stevens Institute of Technology, Hoboken, New Jersey.

His scientific researches after his appointment at Stevens were principally published in the American Journal of Science under the title of “Researches in Acoustics” (1871–1875). These include experiments showing that the translation of a vibrating body causes it to emit waves differing in length from those produced by the same vibrating body when stationary; a method of detecting the phases of vibration in the air surrounding a sounding body, leading to his invention of the topophone; mode of measuring the wavelengths and velocities of sound in gases, resulting in the invention of an acoustic pyrometer; the determination of relative intensities of sound; five new methods of sonorous analysis for the decomposition of a compound sound into its elementary tones; the discovery that the fibrils of the antennae of the male mosquito vibrate sympathetically to notes which have the range of pitch of the sounds given out by the female mosquito; and the determination of the laws of vibration of tuning forks, especially in the direction of the bearing of these laws on the action of the chronoscopes that are used in determining the velocities of projectiles.

Mayer received the degree of Ph.D. from Pennsylvania College in 1866. He was a member of scientific societies, and in 1872 was elected to the National Academy of Sciences. In 1873 he was one of the associate editors of the American Journal of Science, but after a year's service withdrew on account of failing eyesight and went to visit England.

== Publications ==
He contributed to the Scientific American Supplement during 1876-1878 an extensive series of papers “On the Minute Measurements of Modern Science.” His other memoirs include:

- “Estimation of the Weights of very small Portions of Matter” (1858)
- “On the Effects of Magnetization” in changing the dimensions of iron and steel bars (1873)
- “Method of Investigating the Composite Nature of the Electric Discharge” (1874)
- “Experiments with Floating Magnets” (1878)
- “Acoustic Repulsions” (1878)
- “A New Spherometer” (1886)
- “On the Coefficient of Expansion and Diathermancy of Ebonite” (1886)
- “On Measures of Absolute Radiation” (1886)

Besides his numerous articles in his special branches of inquiry contributed to cyclopædias and journals, he published:

- Lecture Notes on Physics (Philadelphia, 1868)
- The Earth a Great Magnet (New Haven, 1872)
- Light (New York, 1877)
- Sound (1878)
- Sport with Gun and Rod in American Woods and Waters (1883)

== Family ==
His brother Francis Blackwell Mayer was a noted painter. Their uncle Brantz Mayer was a noted author. Alfred Goldsborough Mayer was his son.
