= Maryland Center for History and Culture =

Maryland cultural institution

- Abbreviation: MCHC
- Formation: March 1, 1844; 182 years ago
- Tax ID no.: 52-0403670
- Legal status: 501(c)(3) nonprofit organization
- Purpose: The Maryland Center for History and Culture collects, preserves, and interprets the history, art, and culture of Maryland. By exploring multiple perspectives and sharing national stories through the lens of Maryland, the MCHC inspires critical thinking, creativity, and community.
- Location(s): 610 Park Avenue, Baltimore, Maryland 21201-4674 United States
- Coordinates: 39°17′49″N 76°37′7″W
- Chairman: John Banes
- President, Chief Executive Officer: Katie Caljean
- Publication: Maryland Historical Magazine
- Revenue: $4.6 million (2020)
- Expenses: $4.3 million (2020)
- Endowment: $12,780,634
- Employees: 38 (2021)
- Volunteers: 19 (2021)
- Website: www.mdhistory.org

The Maryland Center for History and Culture (MCHC), formerly the Maryland Historical Society (MdHS), founded on March 1, 1844, is the oldest cultural institution in the U.S. state of Maryland. The organization "collects, preserves, and interprets objects and materials reflecting Maryland's diverse heritage". The MCHC has a museum, library, holds educational programs, and publishes scholarly works on Maryland.

== History ==
Some 20 members of the Maryland Colonization Society came together on January 27, 1844, to organize the historical archives for the state. The incorporators of the Maryland Historical Society (MdHS) were Brantz Mayer, John P. Kennedy, John H. B. Latrobe, Robert Gilmore Sr., John V. L. MeMahon, Frederick William Brune Jr., Charles F. Mayer, Sebastian F. Streeter, John L. Carey, George W. Dobbin, John Spear Smith, Bernard U. Campbell, William G. Lyford, Stephen Collins, Fielding Lucas Jr., John J. Donaldson, Robert Carey Long Sr., William A. Talbot, Severn Teackle Wallis, Charles J. M. Gwinn, Joshua I. Cohen, and John S. Sumner.

Early presidents included John Spear Smith (1844–1867), Brantz Mayer (1867–1871), John H. B. Latrobe (1871–1892), Severn Teackle Wallis (1892–1895), Dr. John C. Morris (1895–1896), Albert Ritchie (1896–1903), Mendes Cohen (1904–1913), and Edwin Warfield (1913–1920).

The MCHC has been located at the Enoch Pratt House in the Mount Vernon neighborhood of Baltimore, Maryland, since 1919. Built in 1847, the Enoch Pratt House was presented to MdHS in 1916 by Ms. Mary Washington Keyser as a tribute to her husband, H. Irvine Keyser, who was a member of MdHS from 1835 until his death in 1916. Enoch Pratt (1806–1896) was a well-known philanthropist who created the Enoch Pratt Free Library and gave substantial contributions to the First Unitarian Church, the Maryland Science Center, and the Maryland School for the Deaf.

The organization changed its name from "Maryland Historical Society", to "Maryland Center for History and Culture" in September 2020 shortly after celebrating its 175th anniversary. Apparently this rebranding was done to place emphasis on the word "center", signaling the inclusion of people from "all walks of life" not only those interested in history; and to expand beyond history to include other aspects of culture, such as art.

== MCHC today ==
=== Journal ===
Since 1906, the MCHC has published Maryland Historical Magazine, a peer-reviewed quarterly journal boasting one of the largest readerships among state historical organization journals. The organization also publishes books on Maryland history that are distributed through a partnership with the Johns Hopkins University Press, including Crime and Punishment in Early Maryland written by former MdHS librarian Raphael Semmes (1890–1952). The MCHC has over 100 titles in the Library of Congress.

=== Exhibitions ===
Notables on exhibit at the MCHC are the original manuscript of "The Star-Spangled Banner" and the letters and journals of Benjamin Banneker. The MCHC showcases include 231 weapons, 866 pieces of jewelry, 2,200 Native American prehistoric archaeological objects, 15,000 musical scores as well as a remarkable collection of 18th- and 19th-century paintings and silver, maritime artifacts, Maryland painted and inlaid furniture, quilts, costumes, ceramics, dolls and toys. Exhibits include Maryland's history, Maryland in art and furniture in Maryland life.

=== Library ===
The H. Furlong Baldwin Library’s collections are both diverse and substantive. The library enables researchers, teachers, and students to see for themselves the records of the past, and to study and learn from its many treasures. The library’s collections include 60,000 books, 800,000 photographs, 5 million manuscripts, 6,500 prints and broadsides, 1 million pieces of printed ephemera, extensive genealogy indexes, and more, reflecting the history of Maryland and its people. These collections are accessible to visitors on-line and at the MCHC campus in Baltimore.

In 1968 the library acquired 80 photographs by Bert Sadler, noted for his work in capturing everyday American life.

On July 9, 2011, Barry Landau and Jason Savedoff were arrested and later indicted for the theft of 60 society documents.

=== Preserve the Baltimore Uprising ===
The MCHC is a community partner of Preserve the Baltimore Uprising, a digital archive devoted to preserving and making accessible media created and captured by people and organizations involved in or witness to the protests following Freddie Gray's death in 2015. The 2016–2017 MdHS exhibit What & Why: Collecting at the Maryland Historical Society included items from the Preserve the Baltimore Uprising collections in a video installation.

== See also ==
- List of historical societies in Maryland
- List of maritime museums in the United States
