= Lucien Blake =

Professor of physics

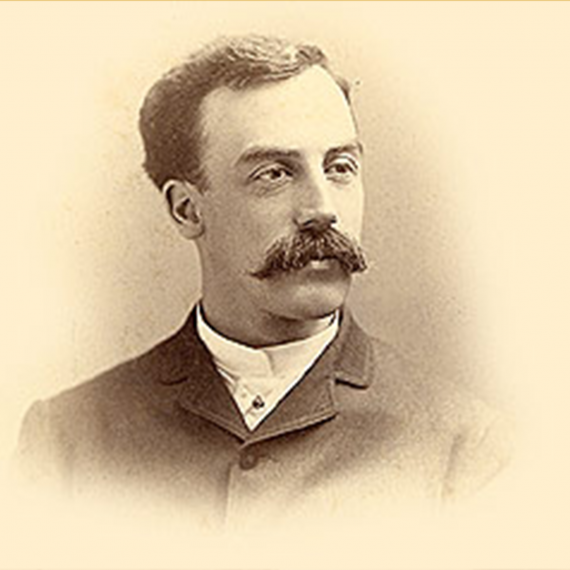

Lucien Ira Blake (September 12, 1853 – May 11, 1916) was an American professor of physics and engineering at the University of Kansas. He pioneered studies in underwater sound transmission, the use of X-rays in medicine and electrochemistry. Blake Hall in the University of Kansas was named after him.

== Life and work ==
Blake was born in Mansfield, Massachusetts, where his father Mortimer Blake (1813-1884) was a Congregationalist minister married to Harriet Louisa Daniels (1817-1906). After graduating from Amherst College in 1877, he went to the University of Berlin where he received a PhD with studies under Heinrich Hertz. He returned to take up a position in 1885 at the Rose Polytechnic Institute in Terre Haute, Indiana. Here he conducted experiments on underwater acoustic communication. He experimented on an underwater communication system off Sandy Hook, New Jersey. He patented several inventions and in 1887 he moved to the University of Kansas. Here he set up a four year course in electrical engineering. From 1892 he managed to set up a new physical and electrical laboratory which came to be called "Blake Hall" in 1898 (it was demolished in 1963). In 1893 he was declared one of the 40 most eminent electricians of the world and put in charge of the International Electrical Congress held alongside the World's Columbian Exposition at Chicago. He took an interest in applied science and worked on X-ray use for medical diagnostics. Along with Edward C. Franklin of the chemistry department they shortened the process of X-ray photography from 45 minutes to 3 minutes. In 1901 he received a patent for using static electricity to separate gold from ores and along with a former student Laurence N. Morsher he created the Blake-Morsher electro-static ore separator in 1901. The patent was sold for $25,000 to a New York mining company on November 30, 1901. His underwater communications patent was bought in 1905 by the Submarine Signaling Company in Boston and they offered Blake a chief engineer position in 1906. He left the university to take up this position. He left the company in 1908 to conduct private research on "cosmic physics". In 1911 he visited Europe with his newly-wed wife Mary Nieten Beroset for nearly four years giving lectures on the way. He became ill after returning to the US. He gave a series of lectures on the universe and on fundamental questions at the Morse Foundation. He died unexpectedly following a minor surgery.

In 1889 he published along with William Studdards Franklin an article examining color blindness among native American people.They tested 285 men and 133 women at the “Indian Industrial Training School” using the Holmgren’s worsted test— and found a 0.7 percent rate of defective vision. Blake also conducted research on skin color and claimed that he could use electrolysis to alter the color of the skin of black people.
