= Loryn Brantz =

American author and illustrator

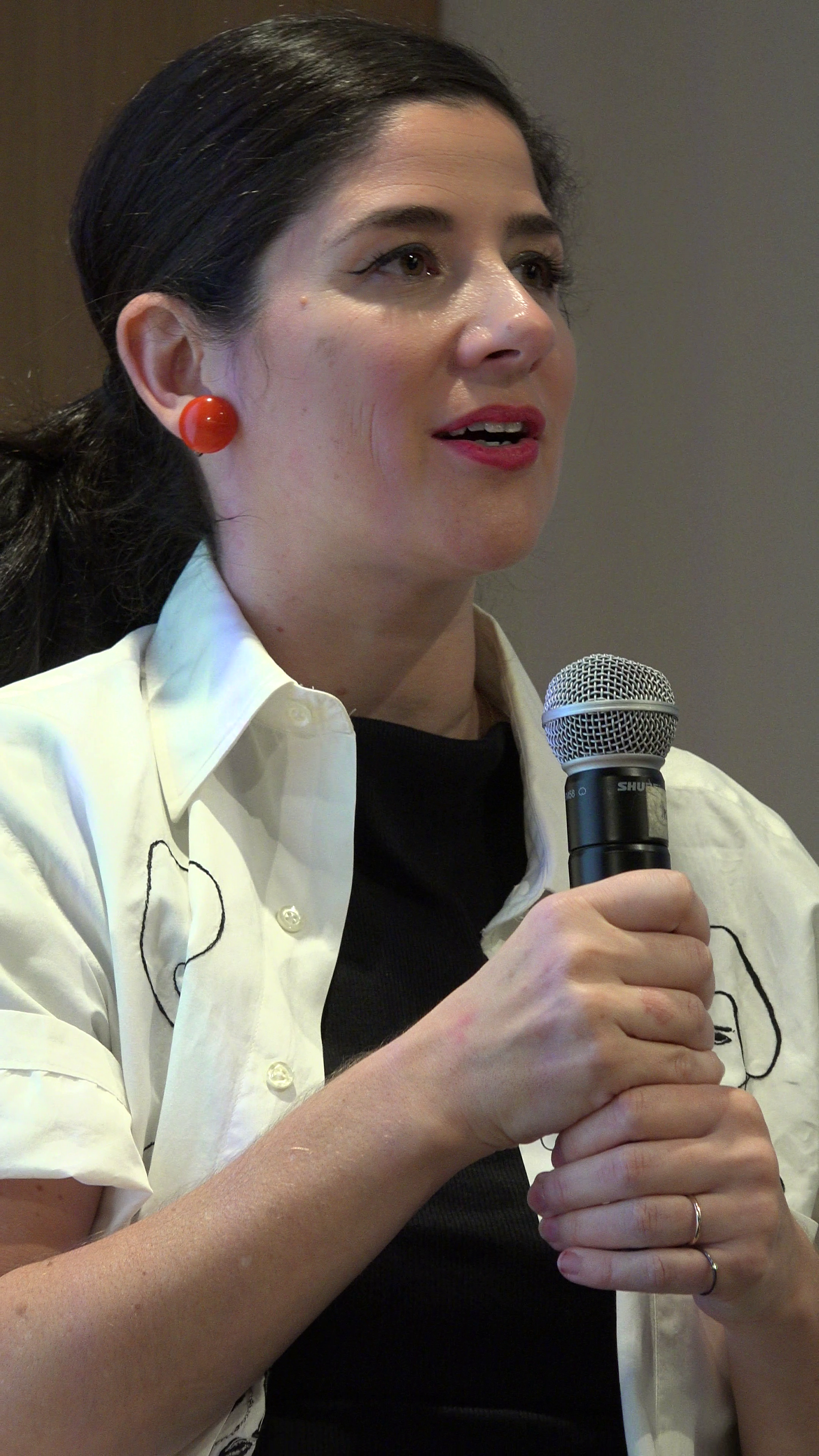
- Brantz at Brooklyn Heights Branch Library in 2024
- Education: Bachelor of Fine Arts in Animation, 2007
- Occupations: Writer; illustrator; designer
- Spouse: Jake J. Brotter
- Children: 2
- Writing career
- Years active: 2006–present
- Notable awards: Outstanding Achievement in Costume Design/Styling, Emmy Award
- Website: www.lorynbrantz.com

Loryn Brantz is an American author and illustrator with a focus on feminism- and women-related topics. She wrote and illustrated the board book series Feminist Baby. She is also the creator of the webcomic series Jellybean Comics and the web-series The Good Advice Cupcake.

Brantz won two Emmy Awards for her construction and design work with Sesame Street and a Moonbeam Children's Book Award for Best First Picture Book for Harvey the Child Mime, which was later brought to the stage by New York City's Children Theater.

== Career ==
Brantz was a builder and designer at Jim Henson's workshop from 2006 to 2011. She worked building props and puppets, her work showing up on PBS, Sprout Network, and Sesame Street, the latter with which she won two Emmy Awards for Outstanding Achievement in Costume Design/Styling in 2009 and 2011.

The book Feminist Baby was published in 2017. Roxane Gay said the following about the book: “Pictures, here, really are worth a thousand words… making feminism accessible with a keen understanding of what kids need to know about [it] in their young lives… Feminist Baby is not just for babies. It's for all of us.” Brantz developed a sequel to be released in 2018 titled Feminist Baby Finds Her Voice! and another book followed shortly in the series called Feminist Baby! He's A Feminist Too! (2019). About the series, Brantz noted that

“We have to raise our kids with their eyes wide open. They're not going to take away all the nuances and important parts of feminism necessarily, but it's important just to have it be in their vocabulary and part of their life rather than discovering it when they're older. It's so that they're aware of feminism and see it as a good thing and not a bad thing.”

Additionally, Brantz has previously worked at BuzzFeed where she created The Good Advice Cupcake and made women focused articles that created international dialogue, such as If Disney Princesses Waistlines Were Realistic. In May 2026, it was announced that BuzzFeed intended on adapting The Good Advice Cupcake into an animated series created by artificial intelligence called Cupcake and Friends for Amazon MGM Studios. This was against Brantz's wishes, and in response, Brantz called on people to boycott BuzzFeed and AI animation.

She is currently a consulting creative director for the YouTuber and educator Ms. Rachel.

== Personal life ==
Brantz lives in New York City with her husband, architect Jake J. Brotter. They have two children. She is of Jewish descent.

== Publications ==
- Harvey the Child Mime (2011)
- Not Just a Dot (2014)
- Feminist Baby (2017)
- Lady Stuff: Secrets to being a Woman (2017)
- Feminist Baby Finds Her Voice! (2018)
- Feminist Baby! He's A Feminist Too! (2019)
- Grab Life by the Balls: And Other Life Lessons from The Good Advice Cupcake (2019)
- Blanket: Journey to Extreme Coziness (2021)
- It Had To Be You (2021)
- For Your Smile (2022)
- Now That You're Here (2023)
- Poems of Parenting (2025)

== Awards ==
- 2009: Emmy Award for Outstanding Achievement in Costume Design/Styling
- 2010: Moonbeam Children's Book Award for Best First Picture Book for Harvey the Child Mime
- 2011: Emmy Award for Outstanding Achievement in Costume Design/Styling
- 2012: Emmy Award for Outstanding Achievement in Costume Design/Styling Nominee
- 2013: Emmy Award for Outstanding Achievement in Costume Design/Styling Nominee
