= Lewis Brantz =

Lewis Brantz (c. 1768–1838) was a trader in Baltimore, Maryland; a ship captain; and the first president of the Baltimore and Port Deposit Railroad, part of the first rail link between Philadelphia and points south.

Born around 1768 in Württemberg, Germany, Brantz was educated in Switzerland. In 1784, the 16-year-old emigrated to Baltimore. The next year, Brantz led a group of other German immigrants to Nash's Station (today's Nashville, Tennessee) via Pittsburgh, Pennsylvania, where they commissioned riverboats and then sailed them down the Ohio River and up the Cumberland River to their destination. Brantz then led another group back to Baltimore. Nearly 50 years later, his heir Brantz Mayer translated his trip diary from German and published it as "Memoranda of a Journey in the Western Parts of the United States of America, in 1785." Brantz himself returned to Pittsburgh in 1790 and painted the earliest known image of the city.

Brantz later became a merchant captain, sailing his ships to Europe and the Eastern and Western Indies for 20 years. With Christian Mayer, with whom he had emigrated from Germany, he formed the Mayer & Brantz trading company in Baltimore, which was most active from 1802 and 1820. In 1808 and 1809, Thomas Jefferson ordered some French books from the company.

Brantz also charted the waters around Baltimore and wrote a meteorological book based on weather observations between 1817 and 1837. Between 1828 and 1838, he sailed to China, South America, and Mexico, where he lived for several years.

In the mid-1830s, he became president of the Baltimore and Port Deposit Railroad, a company chartered by the state of Maryland to build a railroad that would help link Baltimore with cities to the northeast. In 1838, the B&PD merged with three other railroads to create the first rail link from Philadelphia to Baltimore. (This main line survives today as part of Amtrak's Northeast Corridor.) Brantz' service as a railroad executive is noted on the 1839 Newkirk Viaduct Monument in Philadelphia.

Brantz died suddenly on Jan. 21, 1838.
