= Norwood-Hyatt House =

Historic house in Massachusetts, United States

- U.S. National Register of Historic Places
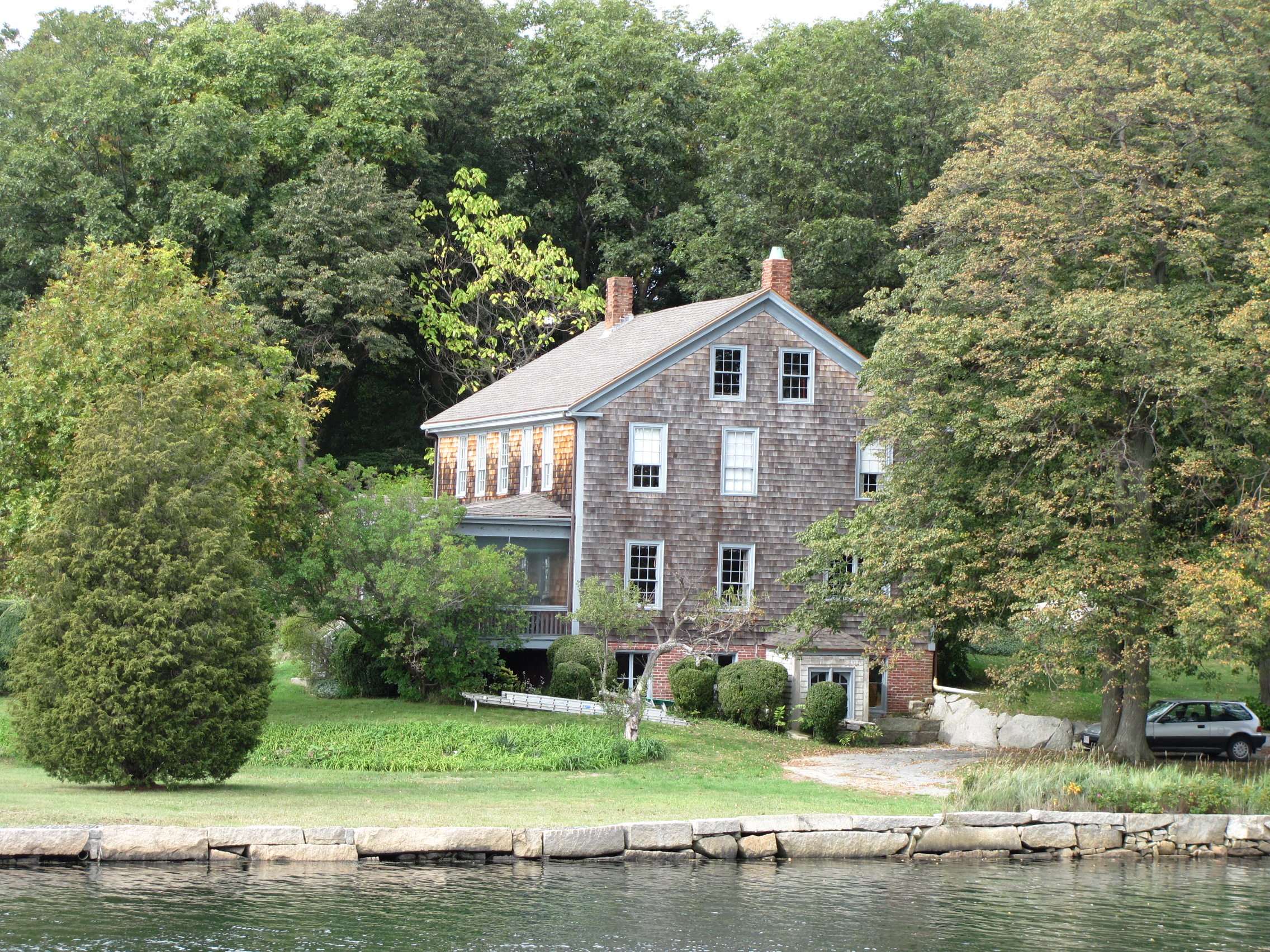
- Norwood-Hyatt House

- Location within Massachusetts Location within the United States
- Location: Gloucester, Massachusetts
- Coordinates: 42°39′4.9″N 70°40′24.6″W
- Built: c. 1664 (core)
- Architectural style: Georgian, Federal
- NRHP reference No.: 00001272
- Added to NRHP: October 26, 2000

The Norwood-Hyatt House is a historic house at 704 Washington Street in the Gloucester, Massachusetts. It is notable as one of the oldest houses in Gloucester, and for its association with Alpheus Hyatt, who did research in marine biology here before establishing the Marine Biological Laboratory at Woods Hole.

The oldest part of the house is estimated to have been built in 1664 for Francis Norwood, a mariner and early settler of Gloucester. It remained in the hands of Norwood family descendants until 1879, when Cape Ann Bank took the house by foreclosure. It was acquired that year by Audella Hyatt, wife of Alpheus Hyatt. In 1880 Hyatt used the property as a base for marine research, but abandoned that use, finding it unsuitable, after one season. It was owned by descendants of the Hyatts until 1987.

The construction history of the house has not been researched in detail. It is a 2.5-story wood-frame structure, with its earliest framing members showing evidence of 17th century construction methods. It was repeatedly expanded, particularly during the Norwood family's ownership, to reach its present configuration. The main block of the house is five window bays wide, and there is a two-story ell added on to the west side (probably in the early 19th century), and several shed-style additions on the northwest part of the house. The foundation is mainly mortared stone, but the eastern wall is made of brick.

The interior of the house has significant features that remain from the 17th and 18th centuries. Many original fireplaces and mantels survive, although most of the fireplaces have been covered over. There are wide pine floors, and the walls and woodwork show many examples of 18th and 19th century construction techniques. Many of the walls were painted with artwork, largely by Audella Hyatt.

The house was listed on the National Register of Historic Places in 2000.

== See also ==
- List of the oldest buildings in Massachusetts
- White-Ellery House, another First Period house in Gloucester
- National Register of Historic Places listings in Gloucester, Massachusetts
- National Register of Historic Places listings in Essex County, Massachusetts
