= Brantz Mayer =

American author, lawyer, and historian

- Born: 27 September 1809 Baltimore, Maryland
- Died: 23 February 1879 (aged 69) Baltimore, Maryland
- Occupation: Author

Brantz Mayer (September 27, 1809 – February 23, 1879) was an American writer, lawyer, and historian. In 1844, he founded the Maryland Historical Society, which is today the oldest cultural institution in the U.S. state of Maryland.

== Early life ==
Brantz Mayer was born in 1809 in Baltimore, Maryland, to Christian Mayer and Anna Katherina Baum Mayer. His father, Christian, had emigrated from Germany to the United States in 1784 along with a friend, Lewis Brantz. The two formed a business partnership that would last for decades, trading as far away as with the East Indies and Mexico.

Christian Mayer's first son was lawyer Charles F. Mayer. He named his second son, Brantz, after his friend and business partner. Childless himself, Lewis Brantz would eventually name the younger Mayer as his heir.

== Education and career ==
After graduating from St. Mary's Seminary in Baltimore, Brantz Mayer sailed for the East, visiting Java, Sumatra, and China, and returned in 1828. He studied law during this long voyage, and on his return home entered law school and was admitted to the bar in 1829. He practiced law from 1832 until 1841, when he was appointed secretary of legation to Mexico, where he remained a year, and on his return edited for a short time the Baltimore American newspaper. Brantz Mayer was again secretary of the United States legation to Mexico in 1842 and 1843.

When he returned home after his 1843 visit, he published his first work, Mexico as it Was, and as it Is (Philadelphia, 1844), which was accused of unfairness and gave rise to animated controversy. In the winter of 1844, Mayer founded the Maryland Historical Society, the original object of which was “the collecting the scattered materials of the early history of the state, and for other collateral purposes.” In 1857, he was elected a member of the American Antiquarian Society.

During the American Civil War, Mayer was an active Unionist, and in 1861 was appointed president of the Maryland Union State general committee, and did much to aid the Union cause. In 1867, he was appointed a paymaster in the United States army, a post which he resigned in 1875. He contributed to the Maryland Historical Society the Journal of Charles Carroll of Carrollton during his Mission to Canada, and Tah-gah-jute, or Logan and Captain Michael Cresap.

== Personal life ==
On September 27, 1835, Mayer married Mary Griswold, and they had five daughters. Mayer remarried to Cornelia Poor, they had three daughters together.

He died on February 23, 1879, at the age of sixty-nine.

== Works ==
Among his works are:

- Mexico as it was and as it is (1844; 3d ed., 1847) completed book at Wikisource.
- History of the War between Mexico and the United States (1848)
- Mexico, Aztec, Spanish, and Republican (1852)
- Calvert and Penn, or the Growth of Civil and Religious Liberty in the United States (1852)
- Captain Canot, or Twenty Years of an African Slaver (1854)
- Observations on Mexican History and Archaeology in Smithsonian Contributions (1857)
- Mexican Antiquities (1858)
- Baltimore: Past and Present. With Biographical Sketches of Its Representative Men (1871)
- Journal of Charles Carroll of Carrollton During his Visit to Canada in 1776, As One of the Commissioners from Congress; With A Memoir and Notes.(1845 & 1876)

== Family ==
His nephew Francis Blackwell Mayer was a noted artist. Another nephew, Alfred M. Mayer, brother of Francis, was a noted physicist. His grandniece, Mary van Kleeck, was a social worker and radical labor activist.
