= Alpheus Hyatt =

American zoologist and palaeontologist

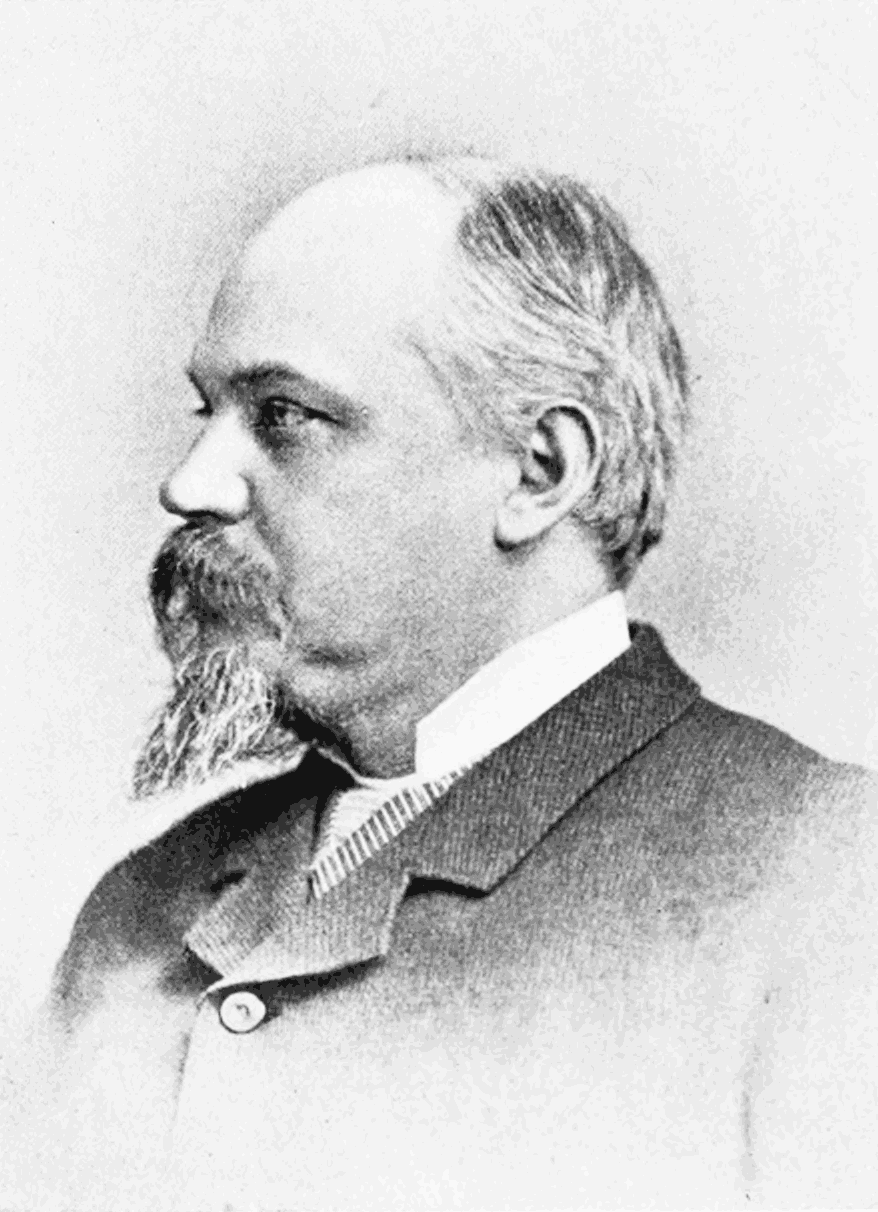
- Born: April 5, 1838; Washington, D.C.
- Died: January 15, 1902 (aged 63)
- Scientific career
- Fields: Zoology; Paleontology
- Workplaces: Massachusetts Institute of Technology, Marine Biological Laboratory

Alpheus Hyatt (April 5, 1838 – January 15, 1902) was an American zoologist and palaeontologist. Hyatt served as the founding president of the American Society of Naturalists from 1883 to 1884 and was the founding editor of the journal The American Naturalist. A student of Louis Agassiz, he was keenly involved in developing biology research and education and helped establish the Marine Biological Laboratory at Woods Hole.

== Biography ==
Alpheus Hyatt II was born in Washington, D.C. to Alpheus Hyatt and Harriet Randolph (King) Hyatt. He briefly attended the Maryland Military Academy and Yale University, and after graduating from Harvard University in 1862, he enlisted as a private in the Massachusetts Volunteer Infantry for the Civil War, emerging with the rank of captain.

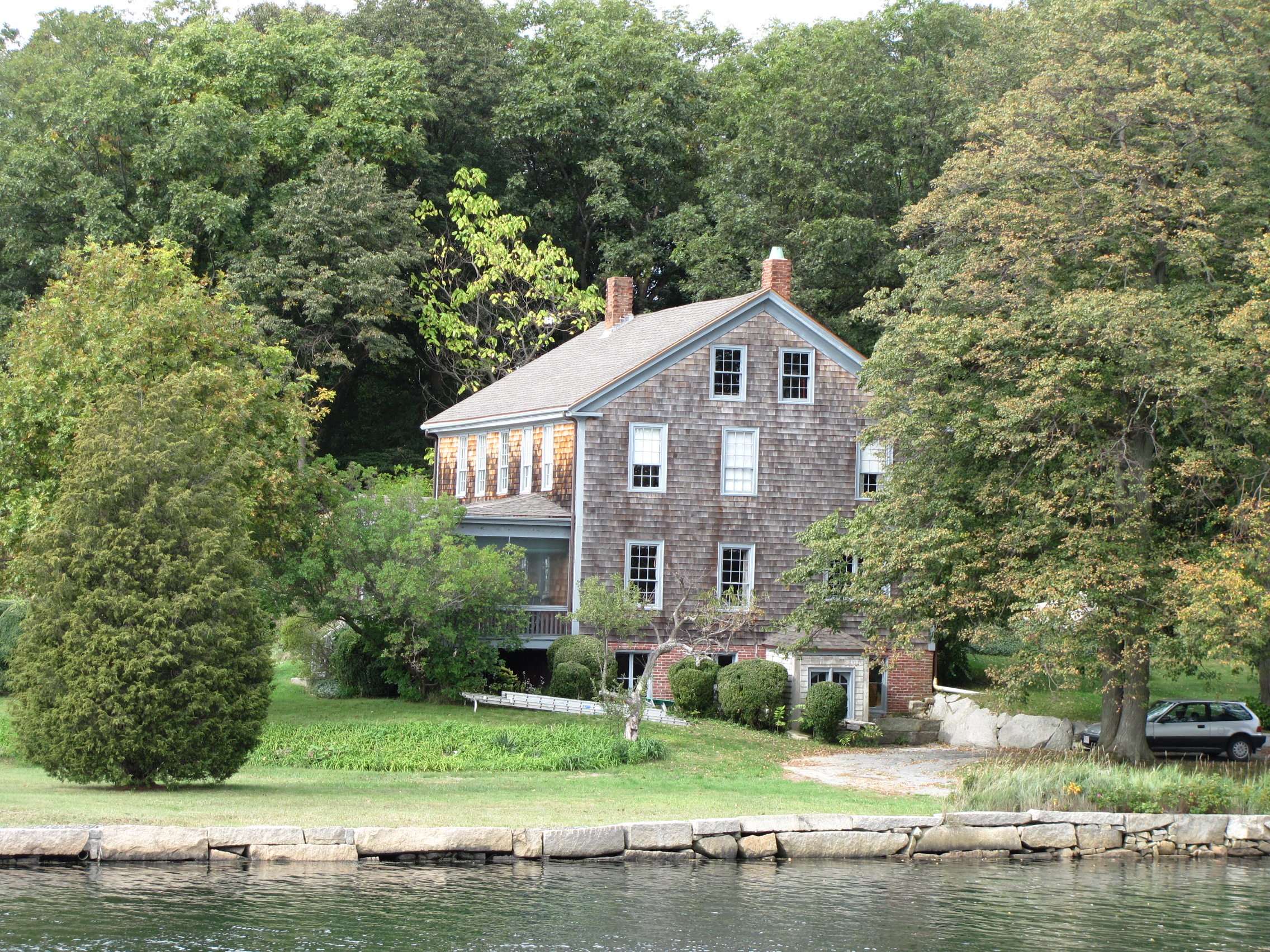
The Norwood-Hyatt House, where Hyatt set up his marine biology laboratory

After the war he worked for a time at the Essex Institute (now the Peabody Essex Museum in Salem, Massachusetts. He and a colleague founded American Naturalist and Hyatt served as editor from 1867 to 1870. He became a professor of paleontology and zoology at Massachusetts Institute of Technology in 1870, where he taught for eighteen years, and was professor of biology and zoology at Boston University from 1877 until his death in 1902. He also served as curator of the Boston Society of Natural History, where his longtime assistant was his former student Jennie Maria Arms Sheldon, and he established a laboratory at the Norwood-Hyatt House in 1879 for the study of Marine Biology in Annisquam, Massachusetts. The River Road building gave him access to the Annisquam River, a salt water estuary. This enterprise was moved to Woods Hole and became the Woods Hole Marine Biological Laboratory in 1888.

Hyatt studied under Louis Agassiz and was a proponent of Neo-Lamarckism with Edward Drinker Cope. In 1869, the American Academy of Arts and Sciences elected him a fellow and in 1875, he was elected a member of the National Academy of Sciences. He was elected to the American Philosophical Society in 1895. In 1898, he received the honorary degree of LL.D. from Brown University.

He and his wife, Audella Beebe, were the parents of famed sculptor Anna Hyatt Huntington; their other children were Harriet Randolph Hyatt Mayor, who was a less well known sculptor (and mother of the art historian A. Hyatt Mayor), and Alpheus Hyatt III.

=== Neo-Lamarckism ===
Hyatt's views on the evolution of species was expressed in his 1866 paper on On the Parallelism between the Different Stages of Life in the Individual and Those in the Entire Group of the Molluscous Order Tetrabranchiata. In this he claimed that extinction of a species was analogous to death of individual organisms. He proposed that there was an acceleration and a deceleration in the number of species over time which preceded extinction. The movement toward this Neo-Lamarckian understanding was supported by Edward Drinker Cope and Alpheus S. Packard. They were joined by Wiilliam H. Dall, Thomas Meehan, Joel A. Allen, Clarence King, Joseph Le Conte, and Henry Fairfield Osborn.

== Publications ==
- Hyatt, Alpheus (1867). "The Moss-Animals, or Fresh Water Polyzoa". The American Naturalist. 1 (2): 57–64, 131–136, 180–186. Bibcode:1867ANat....1...57H. doi:10.1086/270019. S2CID 85203277.
- Hyatt, A (October 1880). "Transformation of Planorbis: A Practical Illustration of the Evolution of Species". Science. 1 (17): 196. doi:10.1126/science.os-1.17.196. ISSN 0036-8075. PMID 17736203.
- Hyatt, A (February 1884). "The Evolution of the Cephalopoda.--Ii". Science. 3 (53): 145–149. Bibcode:1884Sci.....3..145H. doi:10.1126/science.ns-3.53.145. ISSN 0036-8075. PMID 17756220.
- Hyatt, A (October 1884). "The primitive Conocoryphean". Science. 4 (88): 351. Bibcode:1884Sci.....4R.351H. doi:10.1126/science.ns-4.88.351-c. ISSN 0036-8075. PMID 17770756.
- Hyatt, A (October 1885). "Cruise of the Arethusa". Science. 6 (143): 384–386. Bibcode:1885Sci.....6..384H. doi:10.1126/science.ns-6.143.384-a. ISSN 0036-8075. PMID 17830507. S2CID 5665486.
- Hyatt, A (October 1887). "The Scientific Swindler Again". Science. 10 (246): 203. Bibcode:1887Sci....10R.203H. doi:10.1126/science.ns-10.246.203. ISSN 0036-8075. PMID 17775319. S2CID 45399096.
- Hyatt, A (February 1895). "Laboratory Teaching of Large Classes". Science. 1 (8): 197–203. Bibcode:1895Sci.....1..197H. doi:10.1126/science.1.8.197. ISSN 0036-8075. PMID 17746309.
- Hyatt, A (January 1897). "Cycle in the Life of the Individual (Ontogeny) and in the Evolution of Its Own Group (Phylogeny)". Science. 5 (109): 161–171. Bibcode:1897Sci.....5..161H. doi:10.1126/science.5.109.161. hdl:2027/hvd.32044072278484. ISSN 0036-8075. PMID 17781838.
