= Dulux =

Internationally available brand of architectural paint

Dulux International
- Product type: Paint
- Current owner: AkzoNobel; PPG Industries (North America only); Nippon Paint (Australia and New Zealand); JSW Group (India)
- Country: United Kingdom
- Introduced: 1931; 93 years ago (in UK)
- Markets: Worldwide
- Tagline: Let’s colour
- Website: Dulux UK; Dulux India; Dulux Pakistan; Dulux Indonesia; Dulux Malaysia; Dulux South Africa

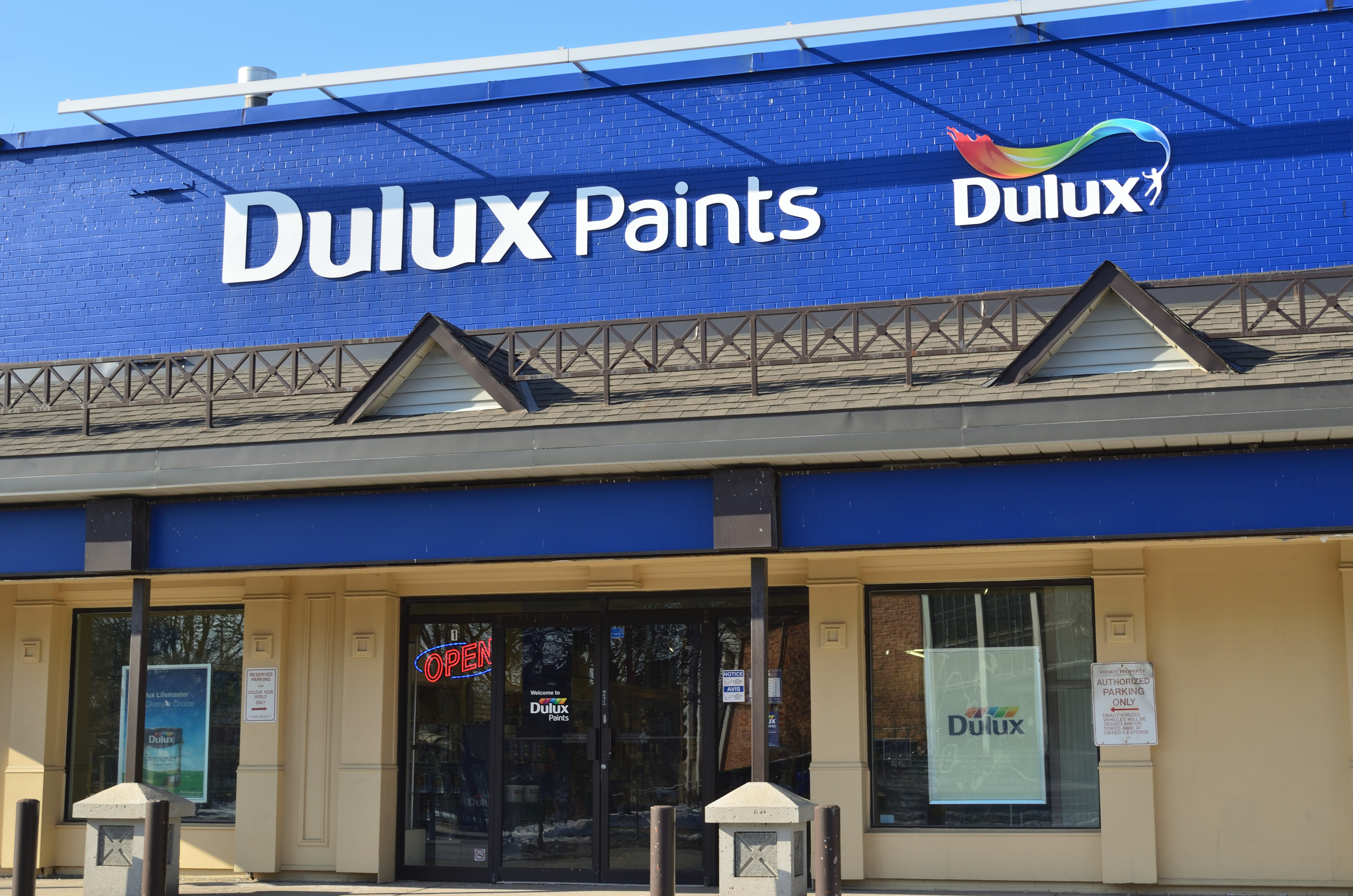
A Dulux store in Richmond Hill, Ontario

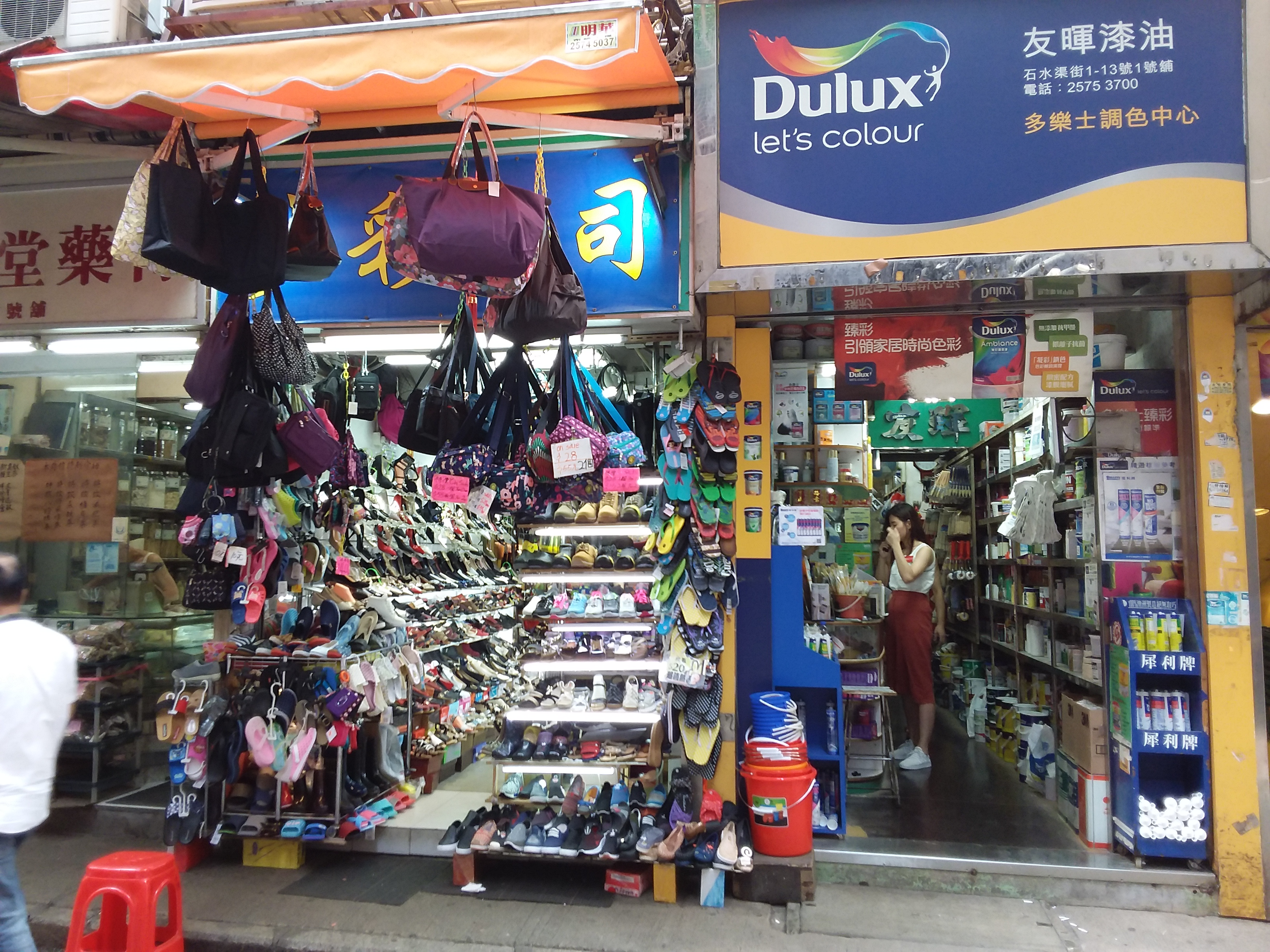
A Dulux store in Hong Kong

Dulux is an internationally available brand of architectural paint that originated from the United Kingdom. The brand name Dulux has been used by both Imperial Chemical Industries (ICI) and DuPont since 1931 and was one of the first alkyd-based paints. It is produced by AkzoNobel (originally produced by ICI prior to 2008) although the North American market was served by the Pittsburgh Paints Company.

On 17 October 2024, PPG, the owner of the Pittsburgh Paints Company, announced that it planned to sell its Dulux brand in Canada to American Industrial Partners, as part of a broader $550 million deal.

== History ==
ICI Paints was formed in 1926. The Dulux paint brand was introduced in 1931. The name Dulux is derived from the words Durable and Luxury.

In the early days of its existence, decorators and their suppliers were the main customers for Dulux, with Say Dulux to your decorator used as an advertising slogan in the 1950s. By 1953, Dulux was available in the retail market and ten years later an Old English Sheepdog was used in advertisements, to the point where "Dulux dog" has become a common nickname for the breed.

Dulux had a market share in the United Kingdom of around 25 percent according to research by Kantar Group.

== Dulux dog ==
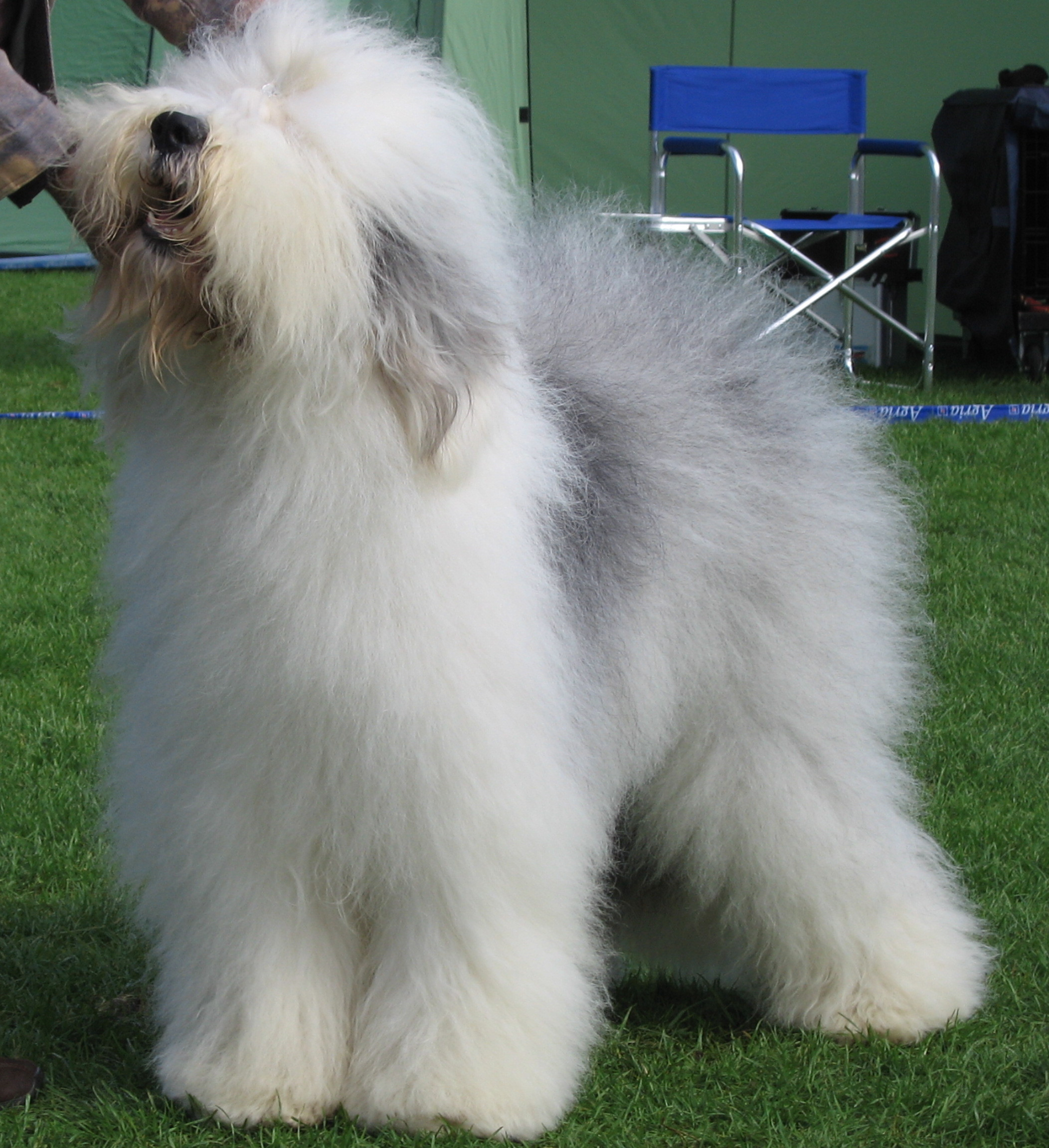
An Old English Sheepdog, mascot for the Dulux brand since the 1960s

The Old English Sheepdog is the brand mascot for Dulux paint. The dog was first introduced in advertising campaigns in 1961. Since then, they have been a constant feature of Dulux television and print adverts wherever the paint is sold. So much so, that many people in those markets refer to the breed as a 'Dulux dog' rather than a Sheepdog.

Over the years, different dogs have appeared in the adverts. However, they all look very similar, due to the carefully managed selection process carried out by ICI's advertising agency. The first Dulux dog was Shepton Daphnis Horsa, pet name Dash, who held the role for eight years.

His successor, Fernville Lord Digby, was the most famous Dulux dog and also made his owners, Cynthia and Norman Harrison, famous.

When filming advertisements, Digby was treated like a star, being driven to the studio in a chauffeur driven car. Barbara Woodhouse was employed to train Digby and his three stunt doubles, who were used whenever specific tricks or actions needed to be filmed. Digby's popularity led him to play the title role in the 1973 British comedy film Digby, the Biggest Dog in the World.

King Hotspur of Amblegait was used from 1974 to 1979 and appeared in over fifty television programmes as well as his public appearances for ICI/Dulux.

Gambit - another Dulux dog, was used in a photographic shoot in 1980 for Philips Video and its new generation of video recorders. By the time the shoot was finished, there was enough hair to fill a mattress - the dog was constantly groomed during the shoot. King Hotspur of Amblegait was used from 1974 to 1979 and appeared in over fifty television programmes as well as his public appearances for ICI/Dulux.

Apart from Dash, all the Dulux dogs have been breed champions, and five of them have won 'Best in Show' prizes.

The Dulux dog was placed at No. 51 in Channel 4's 100 Greatest Television Adverts. In the 2020s, the Dulux dog was depicted on an advertisement having the ability to paint the house by shaking its fur.

== Dulux in Australia and New Zealand ==
In Australia and New Zealand, Dulux has been involved with the manufacture and marketing of paint and related products since 1904 and is the largest manufacturer of paint products in Australia.

Dulux had its origins in H. L. Vosz, a large glass fabrication business and Australia's first major paint manufacturer. In 1912, the Australasian United Paint Company Limited was founded in South Australia, with an office in Lipson Street, Port Adelaide, to take over the paint business of H. L. Vosz as a going concern, and, over the next few years, the factory underwent significant modernisation. The glass business continued independently under the Vosz name, even though its founder had died nearly 30 years previously but, in response to anti-German sentiment during World War I, it was re-named Clarkson Ltd in 1915.

In 1919, the Australasian United Paint Co was purchased for £40,000 by British Australian Lead Manufacturers, a consortium of British white lead manufacturers, which had its Australian office in Melbourne or in Sydney. In the 1950s, the company became BALM Paints, and opened a factory and central research lab in Clayton, Victoria.

Because survey evidence revealed the Australian public had no idea what BALM Paints was, but that everyone knew Dulux, the company changed its name to Dulux Australia in 1971 .

By the 1990s, the Australian paint market was dominated by Wattyl, Taubmans and Dulux.

Until 1997, Dulux Australia was a key player in the ICI Paints World Group, after which, ICI informed ICI Australia of its intention to sell its 62% share in the company to help raise the capital needed for acquisition of part of Unilever. On 2 February 1998, the former ICI Australia became an independent company and was named Orica. In Australia and New Zealand, Dulux was wholly owned by Orica until July 2010, when the Dulux Group was spun off as a separate company on the Australian Securities Exchange. Fairground Attraction's song "Perfect" was used in an advertisement on television.

Dulux Australia was a major player in all paint markets (decorative, automotive, refinish, industrial, powder coatings), but sold off the technical markets, and the Clayton site, to PPG Industries, and concentrated on decorative, wood-care and powder coatings, moving to a new site on Dandenong Road, Clayton, previously owned by Pond's, the beauty and health care product manufacturer.

Television advertisements at the time featured the "Dulux Dog" (Penny), an Old English Sheepdog, and several hundred others of that breed, racing around collecting cricket stumps, drumsticks, wooden spoons, sticks and other items, to stir a newly opened pot of Dulux "Wash and Wear" paint. The accompanying music was "I Woke Up Today", by American band Port O'Brien, from the album "All We Could Do Was Sing".

In August 2019, the Dulux Group was acquired by Nippon Paint and de-listed from the Australian Securities Exchange.

== Dulux in Canada ==
The Dulux decorative paint business In Canada was sold to the PPG Architectural Coatings division of PPG Industries in December 2012.

== Dulux Decorator Centre ==
In the United Kingdom, AkzoNobel operates the trade and retail store chain of Dulux Decorator Centre. There are now over 200 branches, predominantly in England, though there are also branches in Scotland, Wales and Northern Ireland.

== Dulux Select Decorators ==
The Dulux Select Decorators scheme is a nationwide network of professional decorators. The concept was originated by Dulux in 1996 to assure consumers of high-quality work including a two-year guarantee supported by the leading paint manufacturing brand.

== Dulux Trade Contract Partnership ==
Dulux Trade Contract Partnership is a scheme for independently assessed, quality assured contractors. Dulux Trade Contract Partners undergo regular site visits by independent scheme assessors to monitor standards and to identify opportunities for improvement.

== Colour of the Year ==
For more than 20 years, Dulux colour experts have been studying global trends and creating the Colour of the Year:

- 2025 - True Joy™ - Uplifting bright yellow colour
- 2024 - Sweet Embrace™ - Delicate, soft pink colour
