= MacClure & Spahr =

American architectural firm (1901–1922)

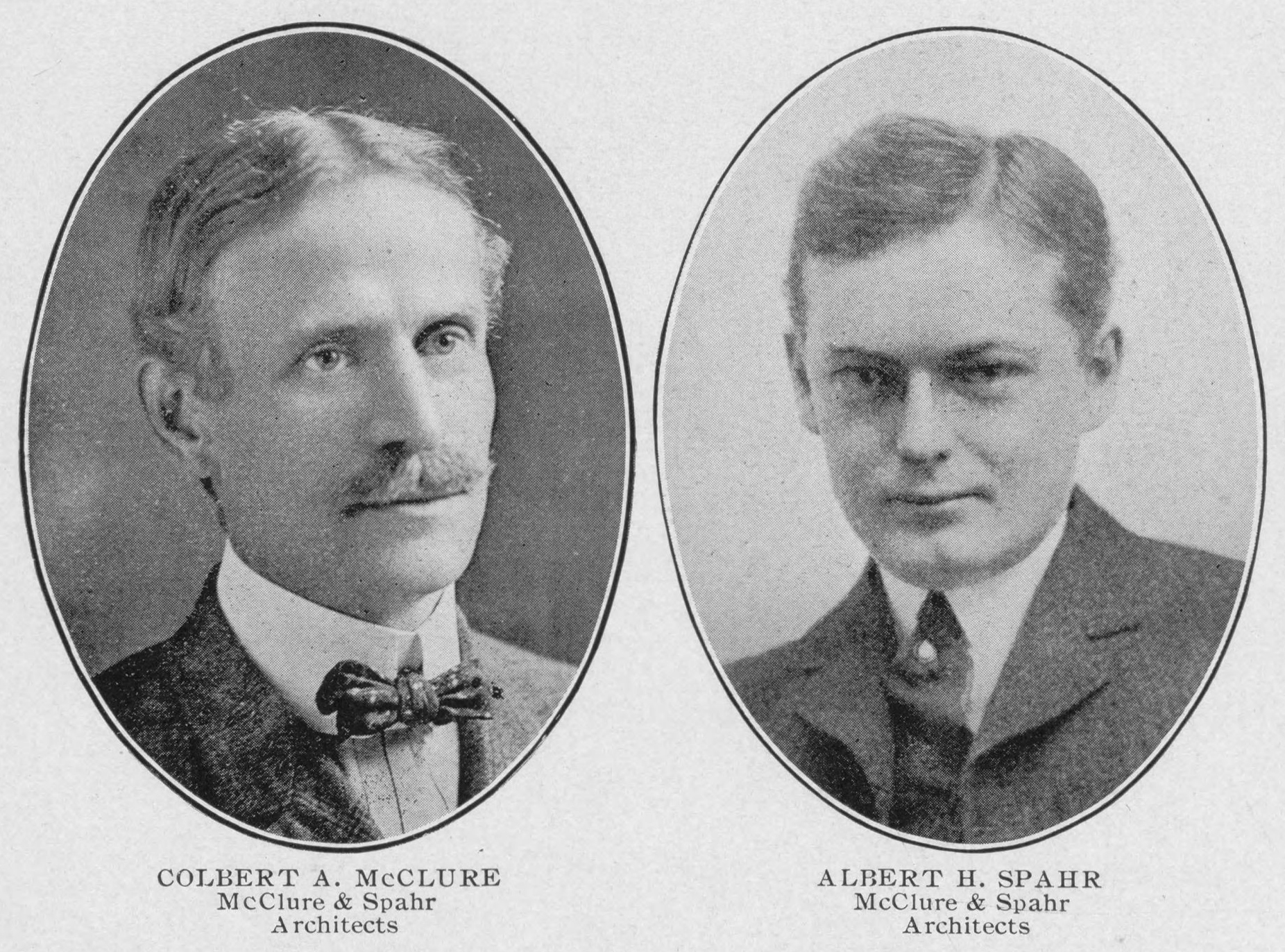
MacClure and Spahr as depicted in Palmer's Pictorial Pittsburgh, 1905

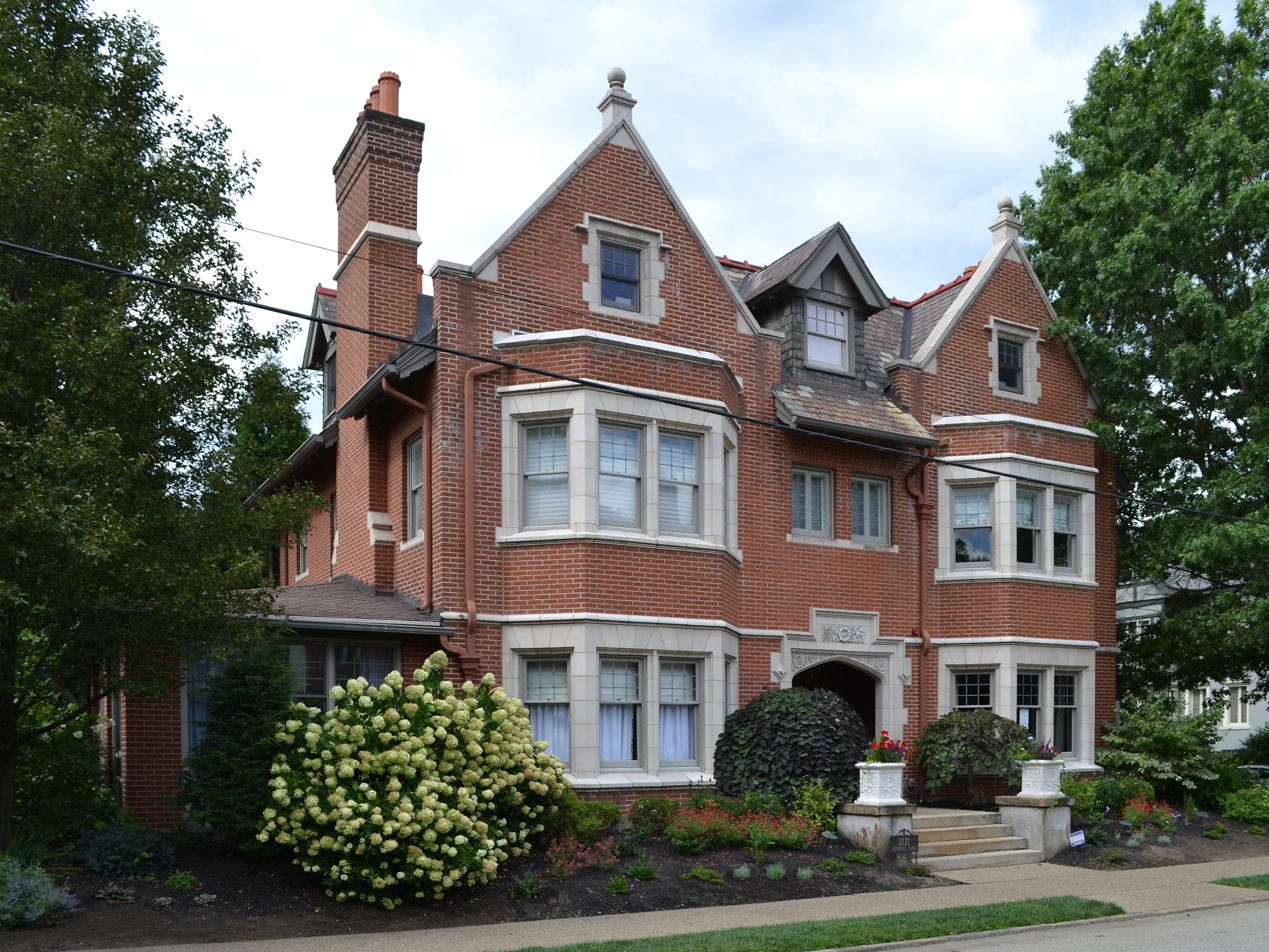
Acheson House (1903)

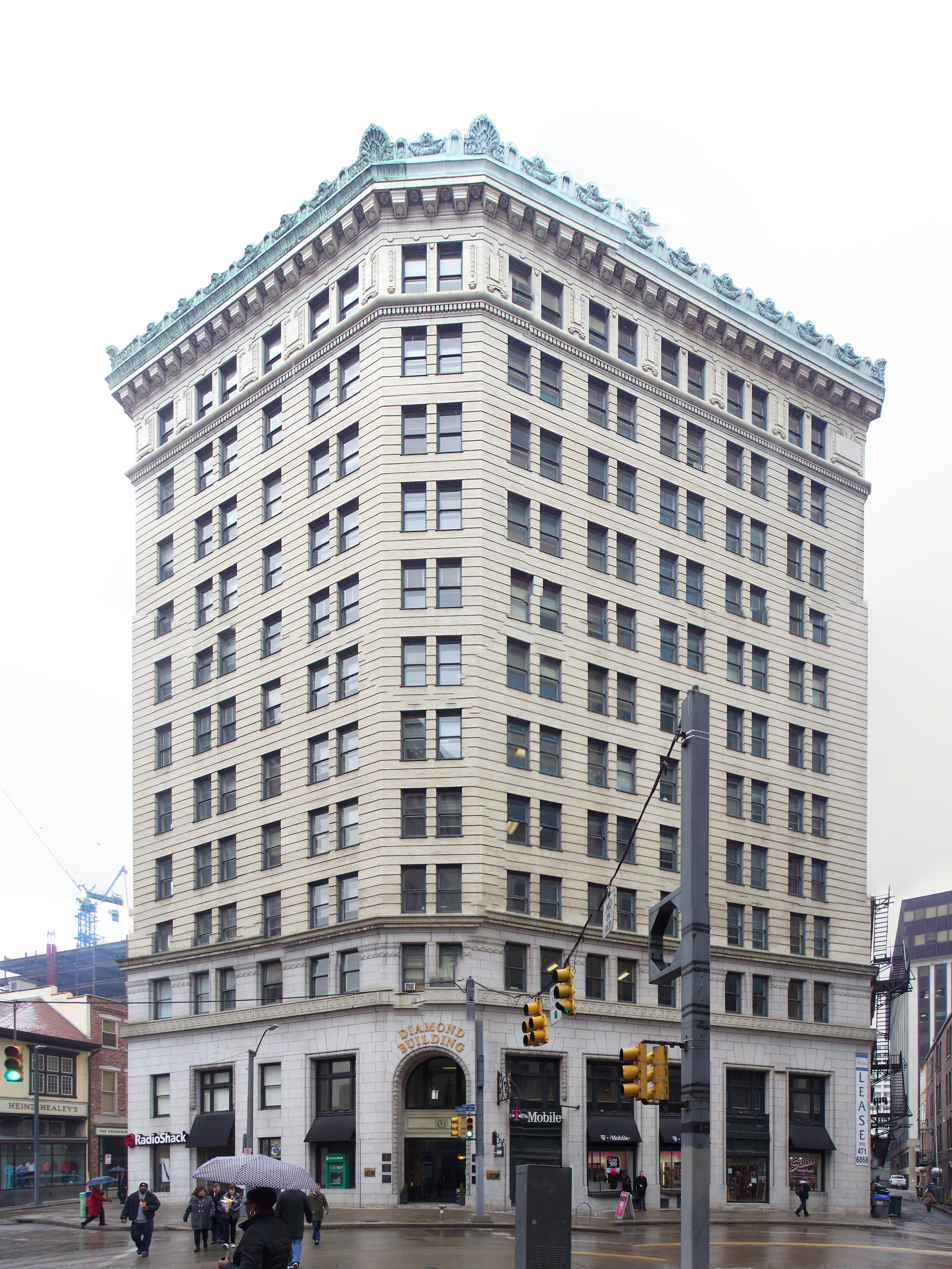
Diamond Building (1905)

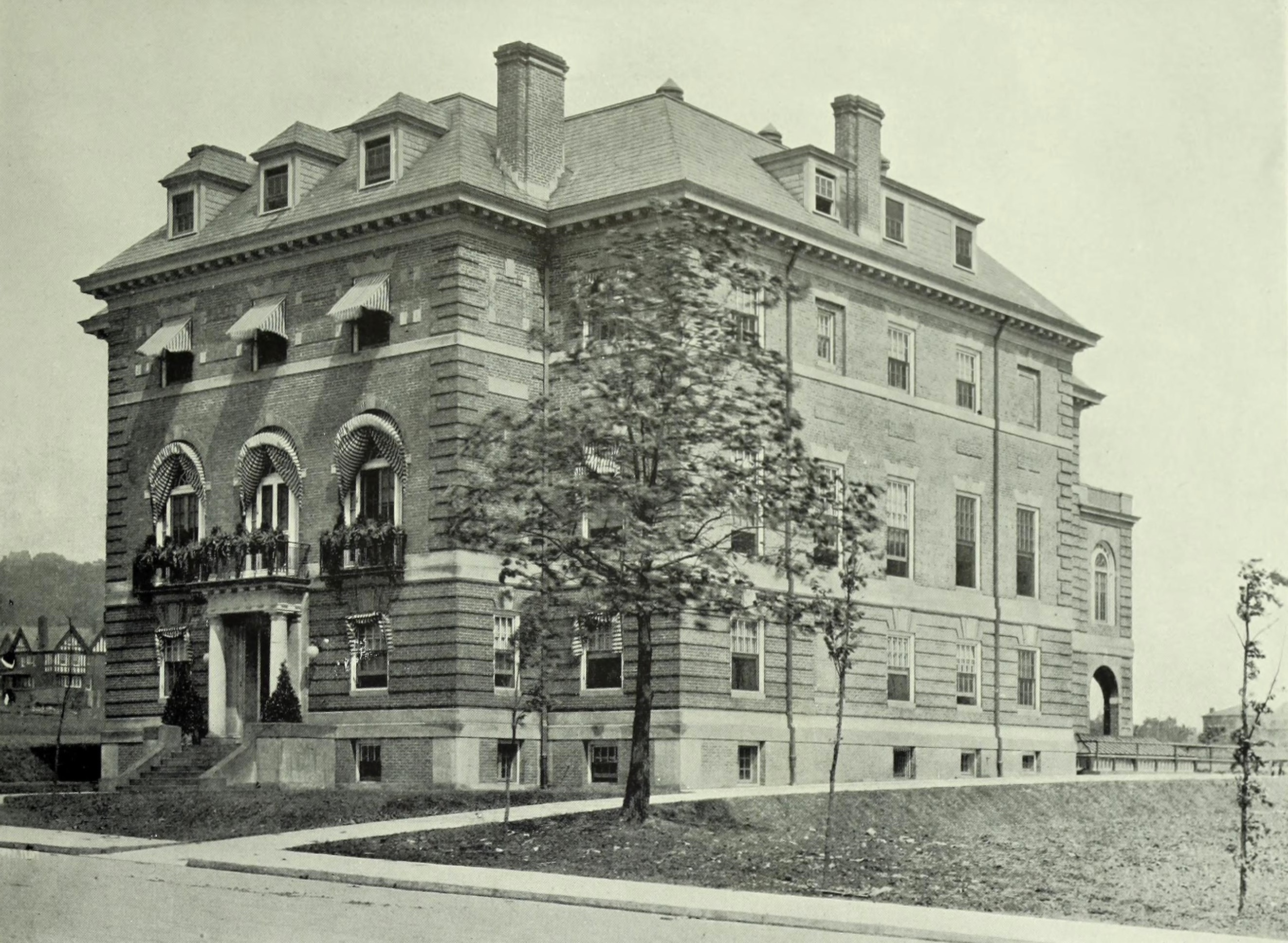
University Club (1907)

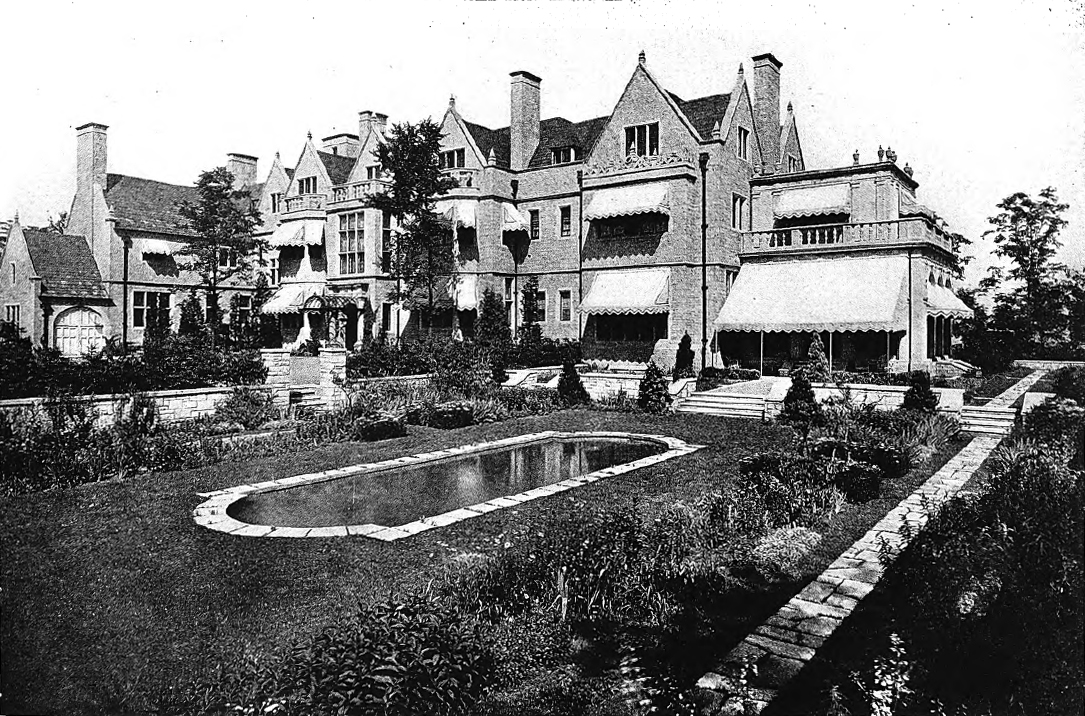
Stonehurst (1915), Grosse Pointe Shores, Michigan

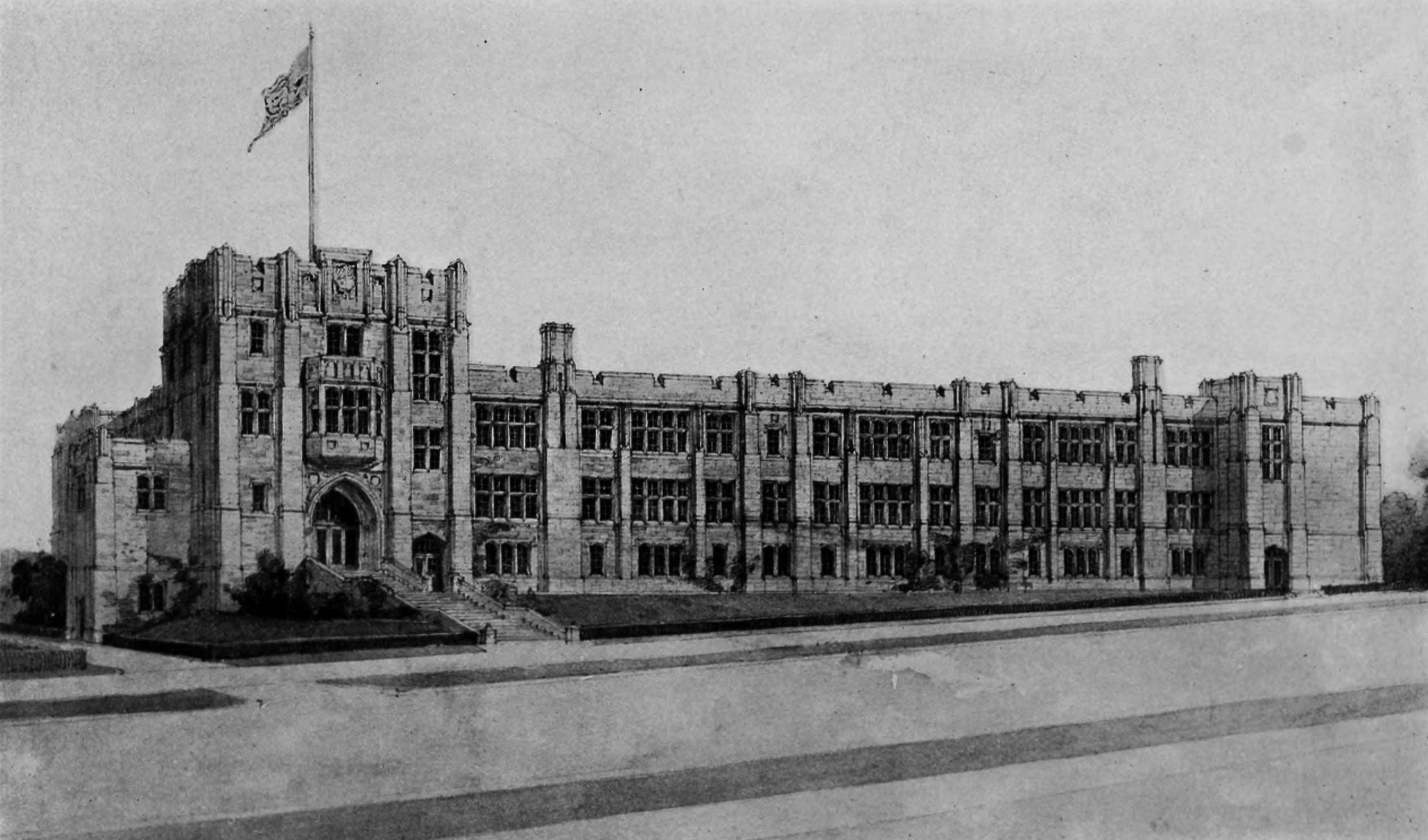
Langley High School, architect's rendering (1916)

MacClure & Spahr was an architectural firm based in Pittsburgh, Pennsylvania which was active from 1901 to 1922. Several of the firm's buildings have received historic designations. The firm was a partnership between Colbert Anderson MacClure (1879–1912) and Albert Hubbard Spahr (1873–1966), both of whom had studied at the Massachusetts Institute of Technology.

Benno Janssen, another notable Pittsburgh architect, began his career at MacClure & Spahr before starting his own firm.

== History ==
MacClure and Spahr met while working for Peabody & Stearns in Boston. MacClure was sent to Pittsburgh around 1897 to supervise construction of the Joseph Horne Company department store and other projects. In 1901, he decided to start his own firm and invited Spahr to join him. Their first commission was the Keystone Bank Building in downtown Pittsburgh, which was completed in 1903 and is now a contributing property in the Fourth Avenue Historic District. The firm was busy throughout its first decade with various commissions including houses, clubs, and large office buildings.

MacClure died in 1912 but Spahr continued to run the firm under the same name until 1922. During this period, Spahr was the architect for two large housing developments, one for the Crucible Steel company town of Midland, Pennsylvania, and one for the U.S. government to provide emergency housing for industrial workers in Erie, Pennsylvania during World War I. He also designed three large manor houses in Grosse Pointe Shores, Michigan for the siblings Hetty Ford Speck, Emory L. Ford, and Stella Ford Schlotman, who were grandchildren of John Baptiste Ford and heirs of the Pittsburgh Plate Glass fortune.

One of the firm's last commissions was the gatehouse complex at Homewood Cemetery, completed in 1922. Subsequently, Spahr retired from architecture and moved back to Massachusetts, where he died in 1966.

== Works ==
Notable works of the firm include the following (located in Pittsburgh unless otherwise noted):

- Keystone Bank Building (1903) - contributing property in Fourth Avenue Historic District
- Philadelphia Company Building (1903), 435 6th Ave. - demolished
- M. W. Acheson Jr., house (1903), 5131 Pembroke Pl.
- Spahr house (1904), 527 Cochran St., Sewickley, Pennsylvania
- Monongahela Incline lower station (1904)
- Diamond Building (1905), 100 5th Ave.
- Greyfield (1905), Cumberland Island, Georgia - NRHP-listed
- Union National Bank Building (1906) - contributing property in Fourth Avenue Historic District
- Grand Opera House (1906)
- University Club (1907), Bigelow Blvd. near 5th Ave. - demolished
- George M. Laughlin house (1907), Woodland Rd. - now Mellon Hall at Chatham University; PHLF landmark
- House at 904 Centennial Ave. (c. 1907), Sewickley
- Jones & Laughlin Headquarters Building (1908) - NRHP and Pittsburgh landmark
- Meyer, Jonasson & Co. Building (1909), 606 Liberty Ave.
- W. W. Smith house (c. 1911), 5325 Wilkins Ave.
- Liberty Manual Training School (1912), Elmer and Ivy Sts.
- J. F. Byers country house (1912), Sewickley Heights, Pennsylvania
- Julia and James Rea house (1912), 102 Woodland Rd. - now part of Chatham University
- Company housing for Crucible Steel Co. (1913), Midland, Pennsylvania
- Elmer D. Speck house, "Fairholme" (1914), 585 Lakeshore Rd., Grosse Pointe Shores, Michigan - demolished
- Oliver Bath House (1915) - Pittsburgh landmark
- Lillian Convalescent Rest (1915), Valencia, Pennsylvania
- B. F. Jones Law Building (1915), 4th Ave. and Ross St. - demolished
- Ralph W. Harbison house (1915), 640 Pine Rd., Sewickley
- Joseph B. Schlotman house, "Stonehurst" (1915), 500 Lakeshore Rd., Grosse Pointe Shores - demolished
- Emory L. Ford house (1916), 485 Lakeshore Rd., Grosse Pointe Shores - demolished
- United States Housing Corporation emergency housing for war workers (1918), Erie, Pennsylvania - 317 of 1,517 planned houses completed
- Langley High School (1922) - NRHP, PHLF, and Pittsburgh landmark
- Gatehouse and administration building, Homewood Cemetery (1922)
