= CR-39 =

Plastic

Poly(allyl diglycol carbonate)
- Polymer structure

Names
- Other names 2,5,8,10-Tetraoxatridec-12-enoic acid, 9-oxo-, 2-propen-1-yl ester, homopolymer

Identifiers
CAS Number	25656-90-0
Abbreviations	PADC
EC Number	694-978-1

Properties
Density	1.31
Refractive index (n_{D})	1.498
- Except where otherwise noted, data are given for materials in their standard state (at 25 °C [77 °F], 100 kPa). Infobox references

Diallyl diglycol carbonate
- Monomer structure

Names
- IUPAC name 2-(2-prop-2-enoxycarbonyloxyethoxy)ethyl prop-2-enyl carbonate
- Other names allyl diglycol carbonate (ADC); diethyleneglycol bis allylcarbonate

Identifiers
CAS Number	142-22-3 "DDC"; 95567-48-9 "ADC", deprecated
3D model (JSmol)	Interactive image
ChemSpider	8541
EC Number	205-528-7
PubChem CID	8879
UNII	AJ5T8CR88I
CompTox Dashboard (EPA)	DTXSID7027095
- InChI: InChI=1S/C12H18O7/c1-3-5-16-11(13)18-9-7-15-8-10-19-12(14)17-6-4-2/h3-4H,1-2,5-10H2 Key: JHQVCQDWGSXTFE-UHFFFAOYSA-N
- SMILES: C=CCOC(=O)OCCOCCOC(=O)OCC=C

Properties
Chemical formula	C_{12}H_{18}O_{7}
Molar mass	274.269 g·mol^{−1}
Appearance	colorless liquid
Density	1.143 g/cm^{3}
Melting point	−4 °C (25 °F; 269 K)
Vapor pressure	0.0011 mmHg
Refractive index (n_{D})	1.45
Viscosity	9 cS (20 °C)

Hazards
- GHS labelling
Pictograms	(GHS07: Exclamation mark) (GHS09: Environmental hazard)
Signal word	Warning
Hazard statements	H302, H315, H410
Precautionary statements	P264, P270, P273, P280, P301+P317, P302+P352, P321, P330, P332+P317, P362+P364, P391, P501
- Except where otherwise noted, data are given for materials in their standard state (at 25 °C [77 °F], 100 kPa). Infobox references

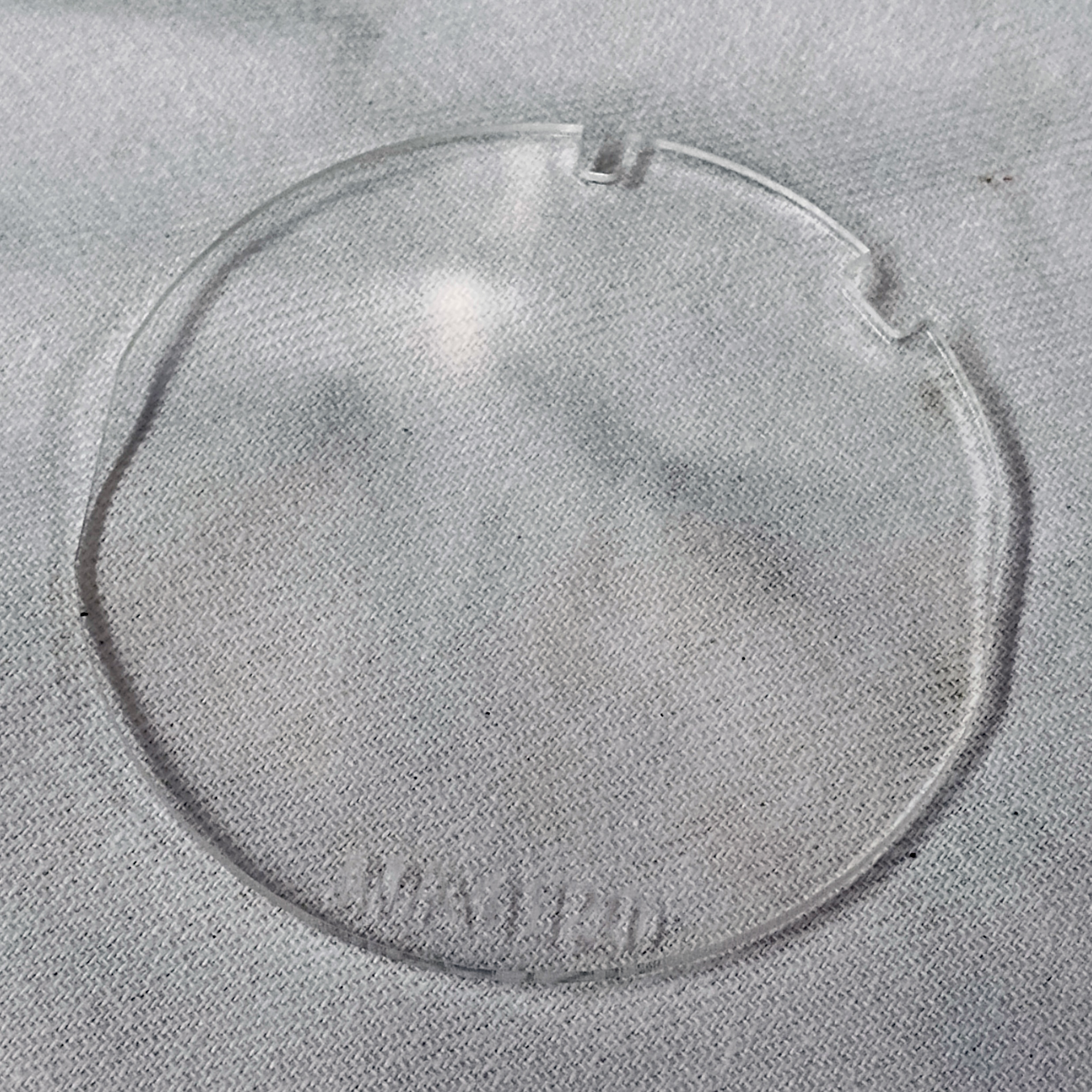
A piece of CR-39 manufactured for radiation detection

Poly(allyl diglycol carbonate) (PADC) is a thermosetting plastic commonly used in the manufacture of eyeglass lenses alongside the material PMMA (polymethyl methacrylate). The monomer is liquid allyl diglycol carbonate (ADC). The term CR-39 technically refers to the ADC monomer, but is more commonly used to refer to the finished plastic.

The abbreviation stands for "Columbia Resin #39", which was the 39th formula of a thermosetting plastic developed by the Columbia Resins project in 1940.

The first commercial use of CR-39 monomer (ADC) was to help create glass-reinforced plastic fuel tanks for the B-17 bomber aircraft in World War II, reducing the weight and increasing the range of the bomber. After the war, the Armorlite Lens Company in California is credited with manufacturing the first CR-39 eyeglass lenses in 1947. CR-39 plastic has an index of refraction of 1.498 and an Abbe number of 58. CR-39 is now a trade-marked product of PPG Industries.

An alternative use includes a purified version that is used to measure ionizing radiation such as alpha particles and neutrons.

Although CR-39 is a type of polycarbonate, it should not be confused with the general term "polycarbonate", a tough homopolymer usually made from bisphenol A.

== Synthesis ==
CR-39 is made by polymerization of ADC in presence of diisopropyl peroxydicarbonate (IPP) initiator. The presence of the allyl groups allows the polymer to form cross-links; thus, it is a thermoset resin. The polymerization schedule of ADC monomers using IPP is generally 20 hours long with a maximum temperature of 95 °C. The elevated temperatures can be supplied using a water bath or a forced air oven.

Benzoyl peroxide (BPO) is an alternative organic peroxide that may be used to polymerize ADC. Pure benzoyl peroxide is crystalline and less volatile than diisopropyl peroxydicarbonate. Using BPO results in a polymer that has a higher yellowness index, and the peroxide takes longer to dissolve into ADC at room temperature than IPP.

== Applications ==
=== Optics ===
CR-39 is transparent in the visible spectrum and is almost completely opaque in the ultraviolet range. It has the highest abrasion/scratch resistance of any uncoated optical plastic. CR-39 is about half the weight of glass with an index of refraction only slightly lower than that of crown glass, and its high Abbe number yields low chromatic aberration, altogether making it an advantageous material for eyeglasses and sunglasses. A wide range of colors can be achieved by dyeing of the surface or the bulk of the material. CR-39 is also resistant to most solvents and other chemicals, gamma radiation, aging, and to material fatigue. It can withstand the small hot sparks from welding, something glass cannot do. It can be used continuously in temperatures up to 100 °C and up to one hour at 130 °C.

=== Radiation detection ===
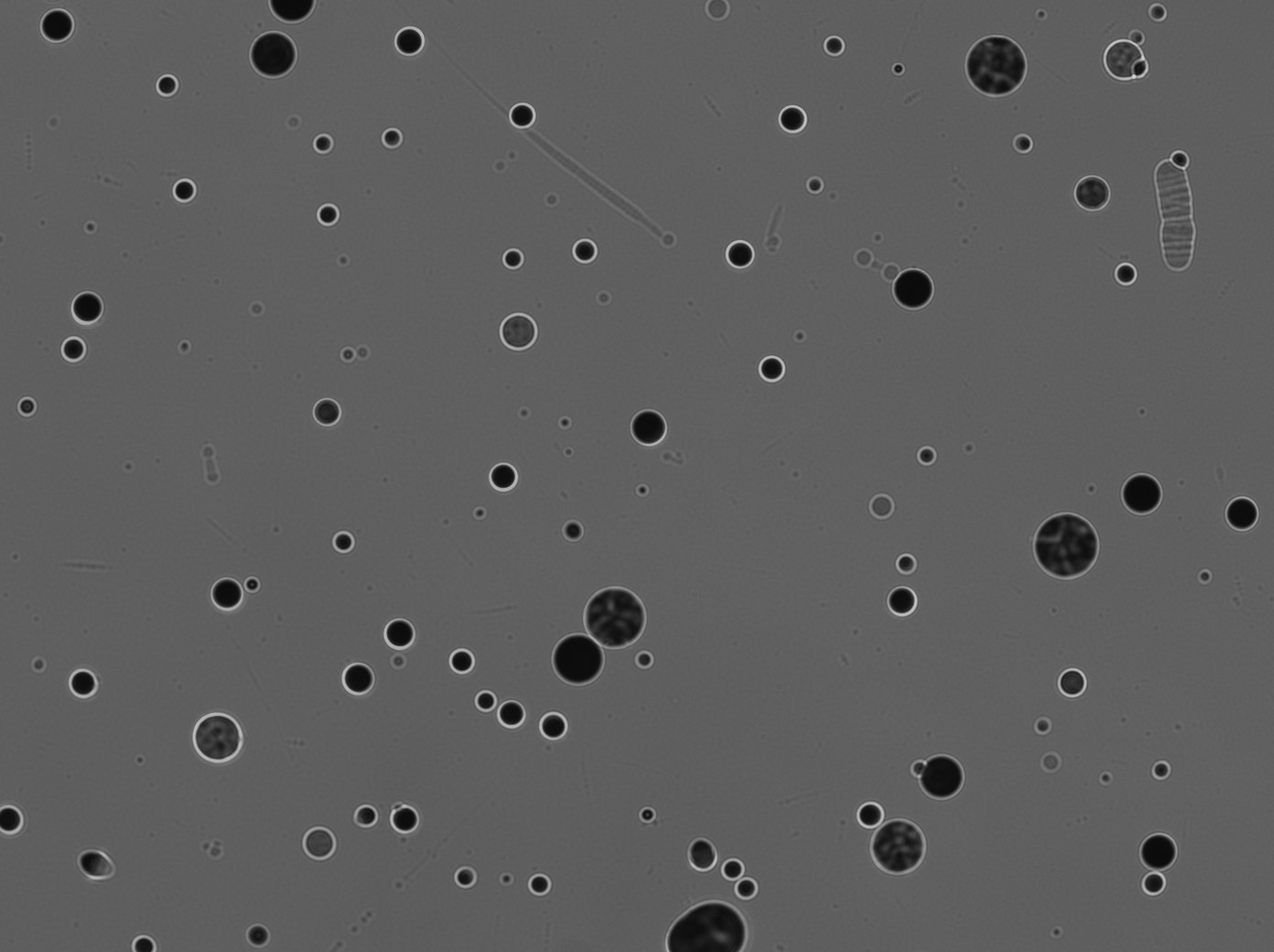
Microscopic image of deuteron tracks in CR-39

In the radiation detection application, CR-39 is used as a solid-state nuclear track detector (SSNTD) to detect the presence of ionizing radiation. Energetic particles colliding with the polymer structure leave a trail of broken chemical bonds within the CR-39. When immersed in a concentrated alkali solution (typically sodium hydroxide) hydroxide ions attack and break the polymer structure, etching away the bulk of the plastic at a nominally fixed rate. However, along the paths of damage left by charged particle interaction the concentration of radiation damage allows the chemical agent to attack the polymer more rapidly than it does in the bulk, revealing the paths of the charged particle ion tracks. The resulting etched plastic therefore contains a permanent record of not only the location of the radiation on the plastic but also gives spectroscopic information about the source. Tracks size, contrast and ellipticity can be used to determine the particle species, energy, and angle of arrival. Principally used for the detection of alpha-emitting radionuclides (especially radon gas), the radiation-sensitivity properties of CR-39 are also used for proton and neutron dosimetry and historically cosmic ray investigations.

The ability of CR-39 to record the location of a radiation source, even at extremely low concentrations is exploited in autoradiography studies with alpha particles, and for (comparatively cheap) detection of alpha-emitters like uranium. Typically, a thin section of a biological material is fixed against CR-39 and kept frozen for a timescale of months to years in an environment that is shielded as much as possible from possible radiological contaminants. Before etching, photographs are taken of the biological sample with the affixed CR-39 detector, with care taken to ensure that prescribed location marks on the detector are noted. After the etching process, automated or manual 'scanning' of the CR-39 is used to physically locate the ionizing radiation recorded, which can then be mapped to the position of the radionuclide within the biological sample. There is no other non-destructive method for accurately identifying the location of trace quantities of radionuclides in biological samples at such low emission levels.

CR-39 is also heavily employed in the study of nuclear fusion due to its ability to provide 1:1 correlation between particle tracks and incident particles. In applications where low signal, electronic noise, and radiation damage may limit the effectiveness of more standard electronic detectors, CR-39 is used to provide accurate time-integrated signal.

Prior to the 1990s, a primary weakness of CR-39 was the large manual analysis time of looking at each track under a microscope. Multiple research groups addressed this issue over several decades by implementing computer scanning schemes for rapid, automated analysis of exposed CR-39 surfaces. These analysis methods reduce analysis time from weeks-months per sample to hours, bringing about a renewed usage of CR-39 for nuclear detection in low signal or budget-constrained applications.

There are only a few nuclear-grade CR-39 manufacturers around the globe currently. Track Analysis Systems Ltd, based in the UK, has provided CR-39 to nuclear researchers in over 80 countries since 2013. In the United States, BlankSlate Innovation provides custom manufactured CR-39 and automated analysis services worldwide. In Japan, Nagase Landauer sells CR-39 for personal radiation dosimetry.

== See also ==
- Corrective lens
