= Taubmans =

Australian paint manufacturer

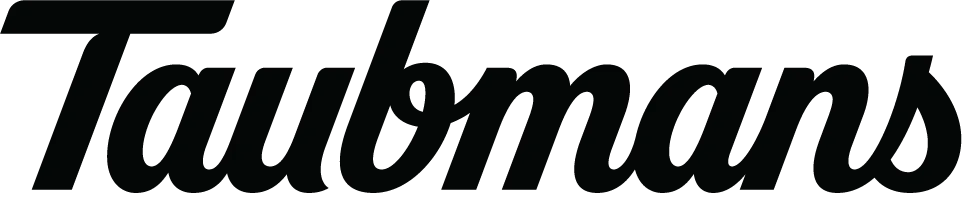
- Type: Subsidiary
- Industry: Paint and coatings
- Founded: 1897 in Sydney, New South Wales, Australia
- Founders: George H. Taubman; Nathaniel J. Taubman
- Headquarters: Melbourne, Victoria, Australia
- Area served: Australia
- Products: Paint and coatings
- Parent: PPG Industries
- Website: taubmans.com.au

Taubmans is an Australian paint manufacturer based in Melbourne, Victoria. It is a subsidiary of PPG Industries.

== History ==
Taubmans Paint was founded in 1897 by George Henry Taubman and Nathaniel James Taubman in Sydney. Before establishing the company, the brothers imported and distributed paint supplies for painters and signwriters. A paint and varnish factory was opened in St Peters in 1901.

In 1912, Taubmans Paint was incorporated as Taubman's Limited with a paid-up capital of £6,000. Two years later, in 1914, Nathaniel Taubman sold his shares to George and, together with his son Claude Percival, established the Sterling Varnish Co in Alexandria.

During World War I, Taubmans opened sales branches across Australia and constructed a factory in New Zealand to meet rising demand.

In 1928, Taubmans formed an alliance with the British firm Pinchin Johnson & Associates, gaining access to overseas paint technology.

George Taubman retired as managing director in 1916 but continued as chairman until his death in 1938. His son, Henry G. Taubman, took over as managing director in 1916 and served as chairman from 1938 to 1952.

During World War II, raw material shortages led the company to diversify into industrial chemicals, including the production of ethylene dichloride and DDT, though this division was later sold to ICI Australia.

By the 1950s, Taubmans operated factories or retail branches in every Australian state and was among the country's largest paint producers. In 1952, Taubmans opened a factory in Yeronga. During this period, it adopted new resin technologies, introduced ready-mixed and washable paints (notably its Revelite interior enamel), and launched the "Spectrocolour" system in 1958.

In 1989, Taubmans was acquired by the UK chemical conglomerate Courtaulds.

In 1996, Taubmans was acquired by Barloworld Limited from Courtaulds for $38.5 million. Barloworld integrated Taubmans into Barloworld Coatings Australia. In 1997, Barloworld acquired Bristol Paint and merged it with Taubmans and later merged White Knight Paints as well. Taubmans operated under Barloworld ownership until 2007, when the paint division was sold to PPG Industries.

In 2020, Taubmans Paint and the not-for-profit organization GIVIT launched the "In It Together" campaign to provide support to communities affected by natural disasters in Australia.
