= Nathaniel J. Taubman =

Australian industrialist

Nathaniel James Taubman (5 February 1864 – 21 December 1931) was an Australian industrialist who co-founded Taubman Paints and Sterling Varnish.

== Early life and education ==
Nathaniel Taubman was born on 5 February 1864 in Sydney to John Taubman, from the Isle of Man, and Sarah Pearson from London. He attended Cleveland Street Public School.

== Career ==
In September 1887, Taubman received a provisional patent for "The Taubman bath heater and hot shower machine." In 1901, he co-founded a paint and varnish business in St Peters, Sydney with his brother George Henry Taubman. Before establishing their company, Nathaniel James Taubman and his brother George Henry Taubman imported and distributed paint supplies for painters and signwriters. The company was incorporated as Taubmans in February 1912 with a capital of £6,000.

In 1914, Taubman sold his shares to George and, together with his son Claude Percival, established the Sterling Varnish Co. in Alexandria.

== Personal life ==
Taubman was active in the Church of England, serving as a warden at St Matthew's in Ashbury. On 25 March 1885, Taubman married Mary Elizabeth Higgs at St David's Anglican Church in Surry Hills. They had two children, Claude Percival Taubman and Elen May McMartin. He died of heart disease on 21 December 1931 in Croydon and was buried in Rookwood Cemetery.
