= Langley High School (Pittsburgh) =

Public school in Sheraden, Pittsburgh

Coordinates: 40.45417°N 80.05472°W

Langley K-8
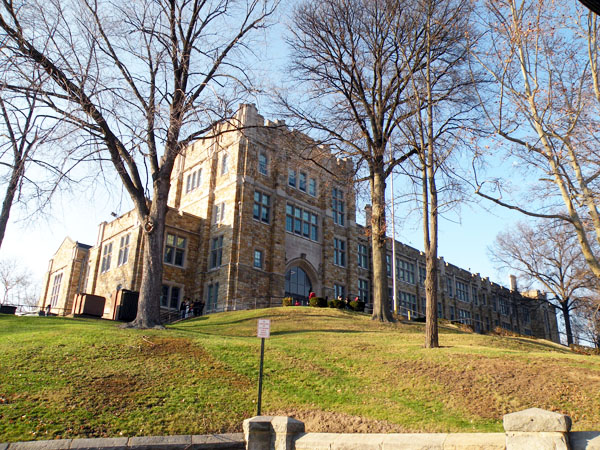
- 2940 Sheraden Boulevard; Pittsburgh, PA 15204; United States

Information
- Type: Public
- School district: Pittsburgh Public Schools
- Principal: Lou Ann Zwierynski
- Grades: 9–12
- Enrollment: 569 as of October 1, 2018
- Color: Maroon
- Representative: Floyd McCrea
- Langley High School
- U.S. National Register of Historic Places
- City of Pittsburgh Historic Structure
- Pittsburgh Landmark – PHLF
- Website: Langley High School
- NRHP reference No.: 86002674

Significant dates
- Added to NRHP: September 30, 1986
- Designated CPHS: November 30, 1999
- Designated PHLF: 2001

Langley K-8, formerly Langley High School, is a public school that is located in the Sheraden neighborhood of Pittsburgh, Pennsylvania, United States.

== History and architectural features ==
Langley was one of ten high schools in the Pittsburgh Public Schools. On November 23, 2011, the Pittsburgh Board of Education approved a reform plan that would close Langley High School as an active school for the 2012–13 school year. The staff and student body were relocated to the nearby Brashear High School.

The district then revealed plans for the Langley building to remain open as a middle school grades 6–8. Langley later reopened to serve students grade K-8.

The building is an example of Tudor Revival architecture with the portions completed in 1923 and 1927 designed by MacClure & Spahr and is listed on the National Register of Historic Places. The high school is named for aviation pioneer and one-time University of Pittsburgh professor Samuel P. Langley.
