= Creighton, Pennsylvania =

Unincorporated community in Pennsylvania, US

- Unincorporated community
- Location within the state of Pennsylvania Creighton (the United States)
- Coordinates: 40°35′14″N 79°46′42″W
- Country: United States
- State: Pennsylvania
- County: Allegheny
- Township: East Deer
- Elevation: 863 ft (263 m)
- Time zone: UTC-5 (Eastern (EST))
  - Summer (DST): UTC-4 (EDT)
- ZIP codes: 15030
- Area codes: 724, 878

Creighton is an unincorporated community in East Deer Township, Pennsylvania, United States; it is located in western Pennsylvania within the Pittsburgh Metropolitan Statistical Area, approximately 20 miles (32 km) northeast of Pittsburgh. Creighton is situated along the Allegheny River at Pool 3. The latitude of Creighton is 40.587N, while the longitude is -79.778W. Creighton appears on the New Kensington West U.S. Geological Survey Map. It is in the Eastern Standard time zone with an elevation of 863 feet (263 m) above sea level.

The Pittsburgh Plate Glass Company was founded in Creighton; its first plant was opened along the river in 1883.
