= Columbia-Southern Chemical Corporation =

Subsidiary of Pittsburgh Plate Glass Company

Columbia-Southern Chemical Corporation was a subsidiary of Pittsburgh Plate Glass Company. It produced heavy industrial chemicals for industry and agriculture, including: anhydrous ammonia, caustic soda, chlorine, titanium tetrachloride, and soda ash.

== History ==
During the Second World War, Columbia-Southern produced a line of 200 polymers. CR-39 (CR for "Columbia Resins" and 39 denoting it as the 39th polymer) had qualities suitable for plastic lenses, making it the most noteworthy of the polymers. CR-39 is commonly used in the manufacturing of plastic eyeglass lenses.

Ammonia was in short supply after the end of World War II; Columbia-Southern was expected to begin producing the chemical in late 1954. Around that same time, the company had a grant program, which gave money to many universities to test new agricultural chemicals on an array of crops under varied conditions.

It has been claimed that Columbia-Southern lost over $845,000 due to unpaid invoices and seizure of property because of Fidel Castro's government nationalization in Cuba.

== Locations ==
Chemical plant locations included Barberton, Ohio, Bartlett, California, Corpus Christi, Texas, Jersey City, New Jersey, Lake Charles, Louisiana, and New Martinsville, West Virginia in the United States, along with Beauharnois, Quebec in Canada.
