= Albright United Methodist Church =

Church in Pittsburgh, United States

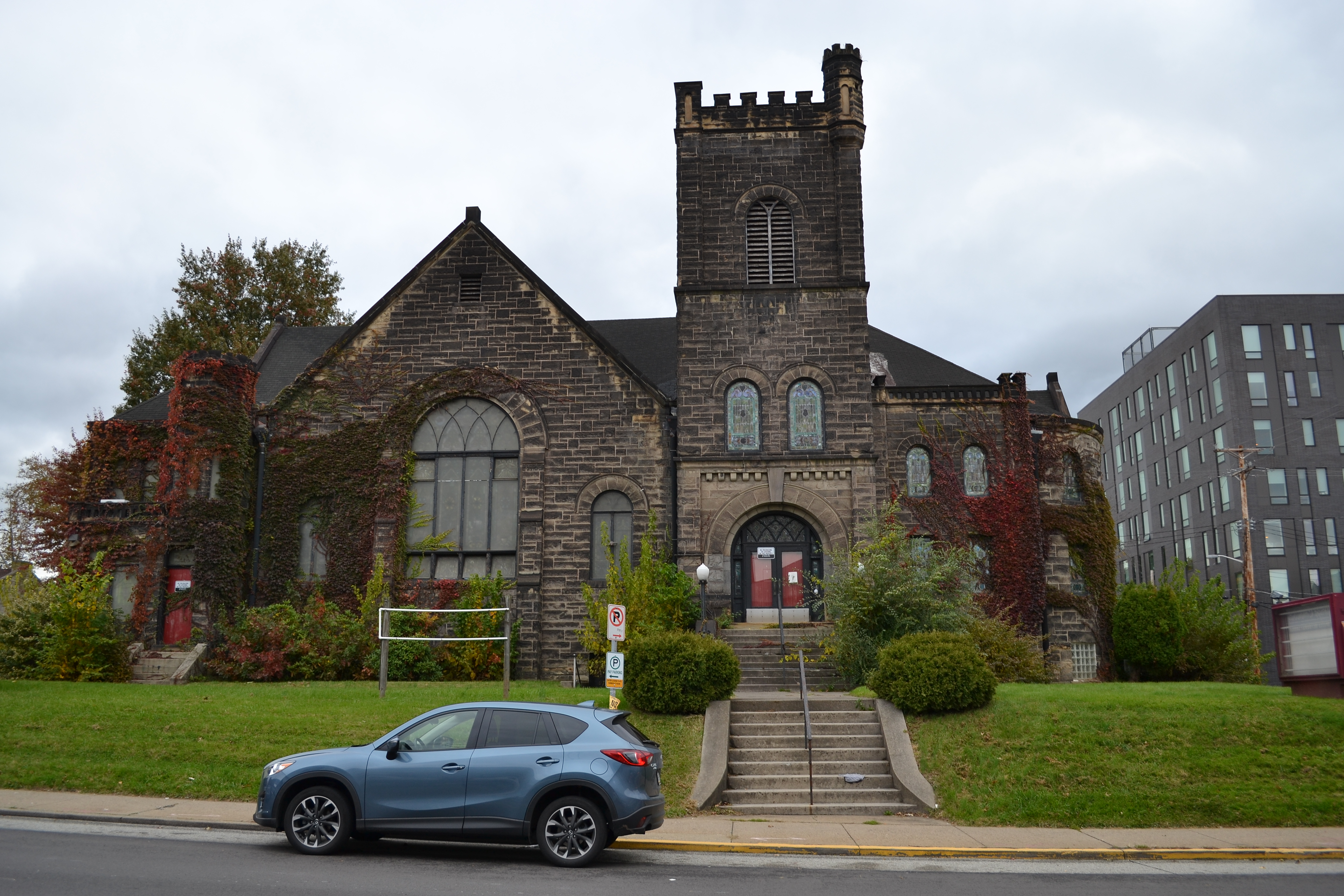
- The church in 2018

- Location within Pittsburgh
- 40°27′24.74″N 79°56′12.88″W
- Location: 486 S. Graham St., Bloomfield, Pittsburgh, Pennsylvania, United States

History
- Built: 1905-06

Site notes
- Architect: Chancey W. Hodgdon
- Governing body: Western Pennsylvania Annual Conference of the United Methodist Church

The Albright United Methodist Church is a disused church building at 486 S. Graham Street at the nexus of the Bloomfield, Shadyside, and Friendship neighborhoods of Pittsburgh, Pennsylvania, US. The church was designed by architect Chancey W. Hodgdon in an Eclectic, Richardson Romanesque style with prominent elements of Gothic Revival, and was built in 1905–1906.

== History ==
The congregation for the Albright United Methodist Church was formed in 1843, and was formally organized in 1845 as the Zion Church of Pittsburgh of the Evangelical Association. The congregation originally worshiped in numerous temporary locations in downtown Pittsburgh. The first two permanent locations also were located in Downtown in the 1850s. However, with the development of the Pennsylvania Railroad lines in Pittsburgh many residents decided to relocate to the eastern suburbs, and the churches began to leave to follow their congregations. The Zion Evangelical Church decided in 1905 to move eastward as well. In August of that year, the church purchased a lot to build on. The construction for the church was finished on July 1, 1906, and service began shortly after. Since then the church has been renamed twice, first as the First Evangelical United Brethren Church, and then as the Albright United Methodist Church, which remains the name today.

The church was nominated in September 2015 to become a City Historic Landmark by Preservation Pittsburgh. The nomination was opposed by the owner, the Western Pennsylvania Annual Conference of the United Methodist Church, which intended to sell the church to a developer that would raze the property. After the Pittsburgh City Council failed to take action on the nomination within 120 days, it was considered to have been approved by default and the church was listed as a landmark in city documents. However, that decision was overturned in June 2018 by the Commonwealth Court of Pennsylvania based on a provision in the city code requiring a two-thirds majority vote by City Council to grant a historic designation against the property owner's wishes. The church was re-nominated in July 2018, but the measure failed to pass.

In 2021 the building was reported to have been deteriorating after being vacant for many years, and awaiting redevelopment of the site, either preserving much of the historic building or eliminating it entirely. As of the end of 2022, local organization Friends of Albright continued to advocate for preservation of the historic building, while supporting development and "re-use of the building that connects and involves the community".

== Architecture ==
Although relatively unknown, the architect Chancey W. Hodgdon's canon of work is Pittsburgh-based and samples design elements from many architectural periods. The church is one of Hodgdon's best-known works, and is designed in an Eclectic style with samples of Richardson Romanesque traditions. The church's strong massing, rough-hewn rusticated stone, recessed doorways, large arches, and short columns are all reminiscent of this architectural styling. These elements are mixed with a medieval crenelation at the roofline and stained glass to include elements of the Gothic Revival style in the building. The design is a small complex of two structures, the church and the parsonage, connected by a single story hyphen. The building is made of masonry and wood, while the church is a rough-hewn Cleveland bluestone. The stained glass windows are traced back to S.S. Marshall and Bros, one of the oldest art glass studios in the country that continued to make pressed flint and lime glass. The church's 39 stained-glass windows makes it home to the largest collection of S.S. Marshall Studio stained glass in Pittsburgh.
