= Dimetcote =

Used for steel corrosion resistance

Dimetcote is commonly used for steel corrosion resistance. It is generally reliable under humid or corrosive conditions. Because of this, Dimetcote is widely used in ships, power generation facilities, and marine, oil, and offshore structures.

== History ==
The Dimetcote patent was approved in 1948 by the U.S. Patent Office. The owner of the patent is PPG Industries. Dimetcote, which was created to protect the surface of metal, could be coloured by being mixed with other paints.

== Type ==
There are several kinds of Dimetcote, designed for different working environments.

- Dimetcote 21–5
- Dimetcote 3a
- Dimetcote 9H
- Dimetcote 9
- Dimetcote 11
- Dimetcote 302H
- Dimetcote 4

== Use ==
=== Marine ===
Dimetcote is popular in the marine industry. The inorganic zinc coating of Dimetcote can protect metal components from moisture.

=== Construction ===
Dimetcote is widely used to protect construction steel from corrosion.

== Application equipment ==
Dimetcote should be applied by specific sprays. Here is a list of several suitable items of equipment typically used by manufacturers.

=== Airless spray ===
Airless spray equipment used for Dimetcote should have a fluid tip with orifice no smaller than 0.019 inch (0.48), and the minimum level of pump ratio is 28:1. Some standard airless sprays such as Spee-Flo, Graco, Nordson-Bede, and DeVilbiss meet these requirements.

=== Conventional spray ===
Some industrial-level sprays (with teflon or leather needle packing, variable speed agitator in pressure pot, separate air and fluid pressure regulators) can also be used for Dimetcote.

=== Mixer ===
A powerful mixer is required for Dimetcote. To meet the high pressure requirement, the mixer should be powered by an explosion-proof electric motor or air motor. Workers can attain optimal spray characteristics by adjusting the tip size or pressure of the spray.

== See also ==
- Corrosion
- PPG Industries
