= Charles Bunch =

American businessman

Charles E. Bunch (born c. 1950) is an American businessman who served as the chairman and chief executive officer of PPG Industries, Inc., until succeeded by Michael H. McGarry on September 1, 2015. Since 2002, he had been a director and prior to becoming president and chief executive officer in March 2005 and chairman and chief executive officer in July 2005, Bunch was president and chief operating officer from July 2002. He was the executive vice president from 2000 to 2002 and senior vice president of Strategic Planning and Corporate Services from 1997 to 2000. Bunch is also a director of the H. J. Heinz Company and The PNC Financial Services Group, Inc. He attended Georgetown University as an undergraduate and received his MBA from Harvard University in 1979.

== Compensation ==
While CEO of PPG Industries in 2008, Charles E. Bunch earned a total compensation of $7,353,617, which included a base salary of $1,041,667, a cash bonus of $1,750,000, stocks granted of $2,931,580, and options granted of $1,263,500.
