= Solid-state nuclear track detector =

Radiation detection method for analyzing nuclear particles

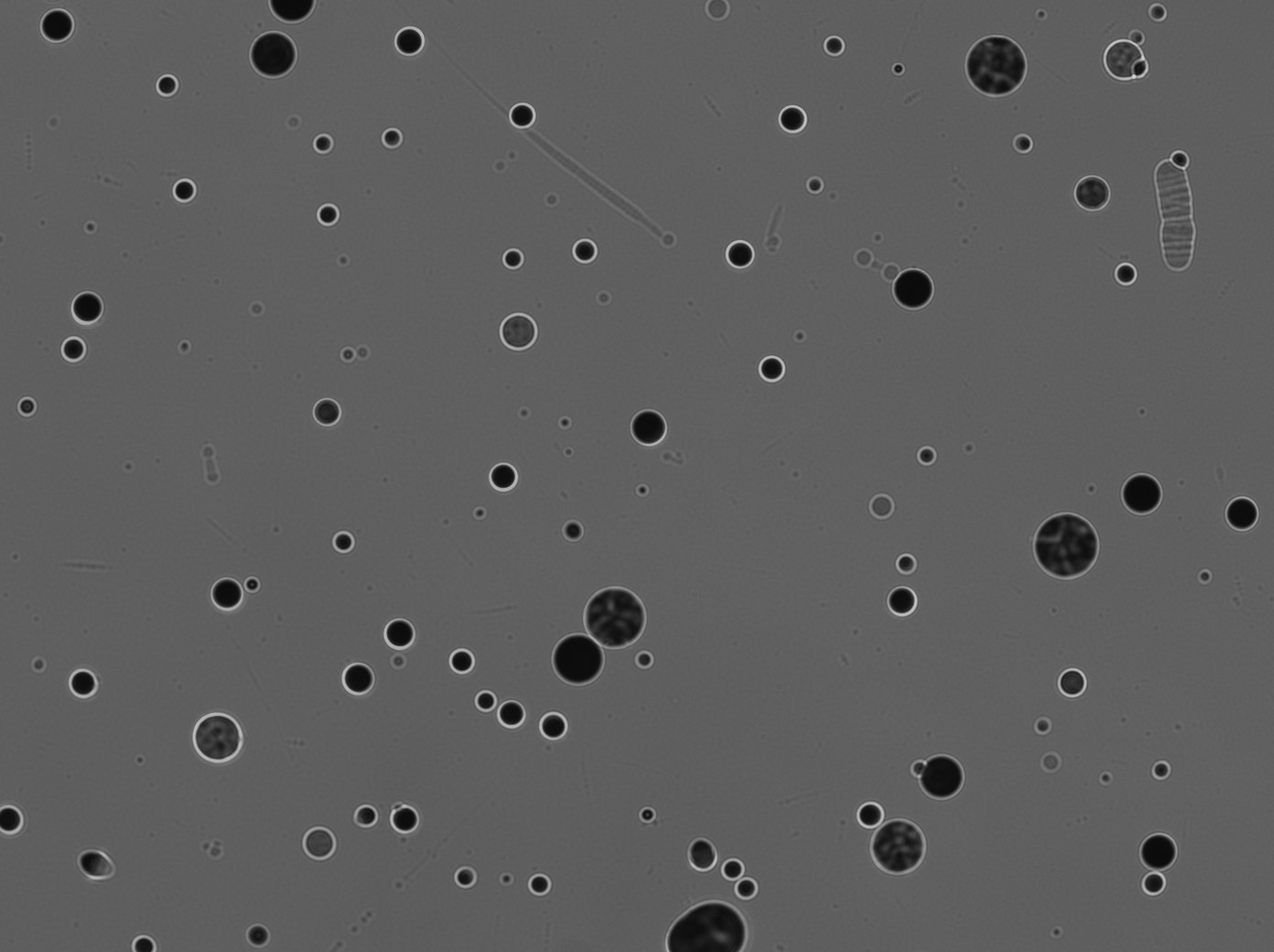
Microscopic photograph of deuteron tracks in CR-39

A solid-state nuclear track detector (SSNTD), also known as an etched track detector or a dielectric track detector (DTD), is a sample of a solid material (photographic emulsion, crystal, glass or plastic) exposed to nuclear radiation (neutrons or charged particles, occasionally also gamma rays), etched in a corrosive chemical, and examined microscopically. When the nuclear particles pass through the material they leave trails of molecular damage, and these damaged regions are etched faster than the bulk material, generating holes called tracks.

The size and shape of these tracks yield information about the mass, charge, energy and direction of motion of the particles. The main advantages over other radiation detectors are the detailed information available on individual particles, the persistence of the tracks allowing measurements to be made over long periods of time, and the simple, cheap and robust construction of the detector. For these reasons, SSNTDs are commonly used to study cosmic rays, long-lived radioactive elements, radon concentration in houses, nuclear reactions with low signal-to-noise ratios, and the age of geological samples.

The basis of SSNTDs is that charged particles damage the detector within nanometers along the track in such a way that the track can be etched many times faster than the undamaged material. Etching, typically for several hours, enlarges the damage to conical pits of micrometer dimensions, that can be observed with a microscope. For a given type of particle, the length of the track gives the energy of the particle. The charge can be determined from the etch rate of the track compared to that of the bulk. If the particles enter the surface at normal incidence, the pits are circular; otherwise the ellipticity and orientation of the elliptical pit mouth indicate the direction of incidence.

A material commonly used in SSNTDs is polyallyl diglycol carbonate (also known as CR-39). It is a clear, colorless, rigid plastic with the chemical formula C_{12}H_{18}O_{7}. Etching to expose radiation damage is typically performed using solutions of caustic alkalis such as sodium hydroxide, often at elevated temperatures for several hours.

Prior to the 1990s, a primary weakness of SSNTDs was the cumbersome manual analysis of individual tracks. Multiple research groups addressed this issue over several decades by implementing computer scanning schemes for rapid, automated analysis of exposed CR-39 surfaces. These analysis methods reduce analysis time from weeks-months per sample to hours, bringing about a renewed usage of CR-39 for nuclear detection in low signal or budget-constrained applications.

== See also ==
- nuclear track detectors that are not solid state
  - cloud chamber
  - bubble chamber
- solid-state (semiconductor) nuclear detectors that do not record tracks
  - surface-barrier detector
  - silicon drift detector
  - lithium-drifted silicon detector - Si(Li)
  - intrinsic detector
