= Jones & Laughlin Headquarters Building =

- Jones & Laughlin Steel Building
- U.S. National Register of Historic Places
- Pittsburgh Historic Designation
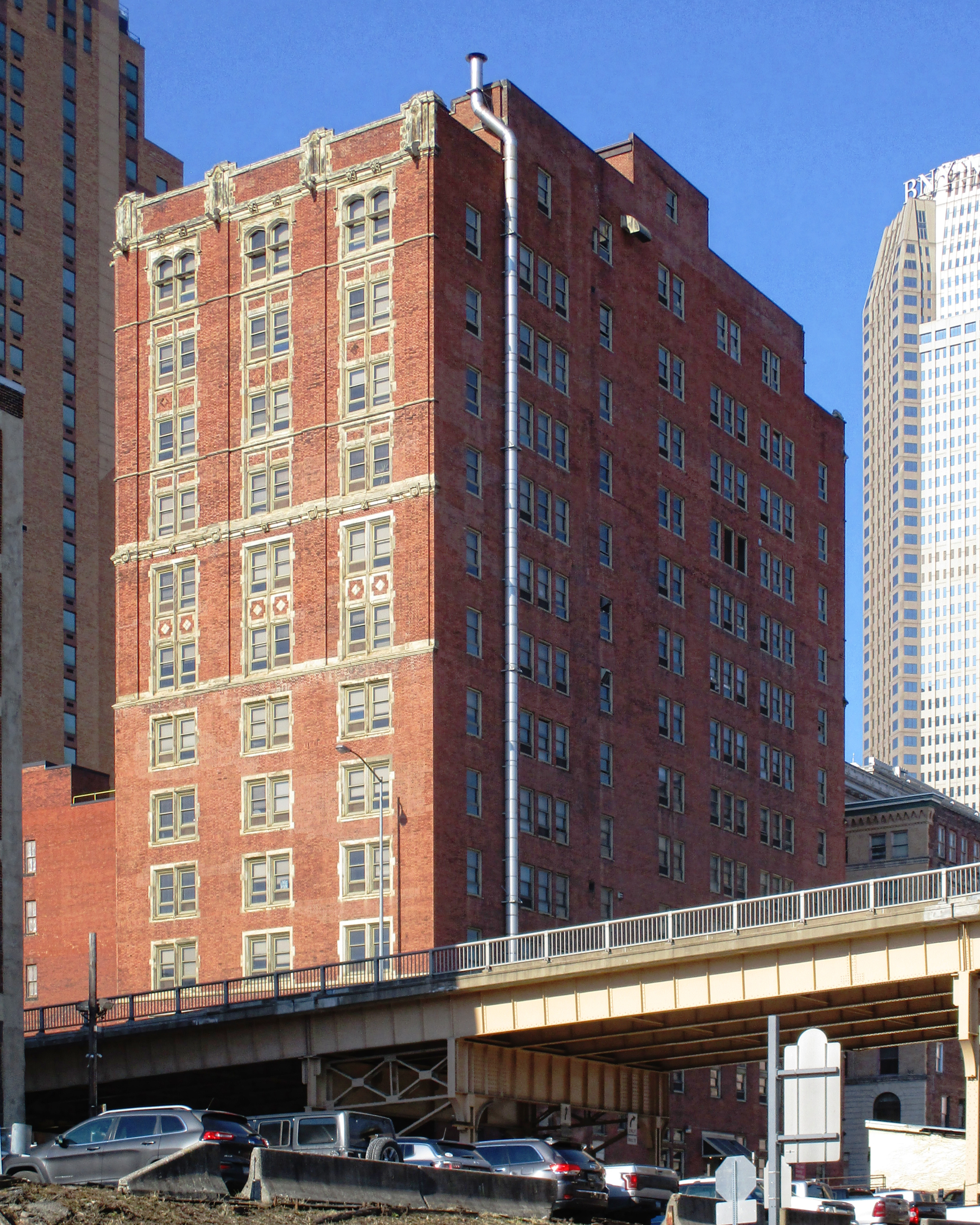
- Jones and Laughlin Headquarters Building in 2022

- Location within Pittsburgh Location within Pennsylvania
- Location: 200 Ross Street, Pittsburgh, Pennsylvania
- Coordinates: 40°26′13″N 79°59′48″W
- Built: 1907-1908, 1917
- Architect: MacClure & Spahr
- Architectural style: Jacobean Revival
- NRHP reference No.: 100007093

Significant dates
- Added to NRHP: November 3, 2021
- Designated PGHL: October 28, 2020

The former Jones and Laughlin building is located at 200 Ross Street in the Downtown neighborhood of Pittsburgh, Pennsylvania. Built in 1907 in the Jacobean Revival architectural style, the building served as the headquarters of the Jones and Laughlin Steel Company from its construction until 1952 and currently holds offices for various governmental agencies in the City of Pittsburgh. It was designated a City of Pittsburgh Historic Landmark in 2020 and was listed on the National Register of Historic Places in 2021.

== History ==
The Jones and Laughlin building was constructed in 1907 as the headquarters of the Jones and Laughlin Steel Company, which was then the second largest steel producer in the country (after Andrew Carnegie’s U.S. Steel). The company was founded by B.F. Jones in Pittsburgh in 1852 and built many blast furnaces and mills in the area surrounding the Monongahela River.

The eight-story building itself was designed in 1908 by architects MacClure & Spahr, who also designed many prominent buildings in Pittsburgh, such as the first section of the William Penn Hotel and the Keystone National Bank. The original, eight-story building was completed at 200 Ross Street by 1908. Due to the Jones and Laughlin Company's prosperity, the company commissioned an additional five stories to be added to the building in 1917, which were also designed by MacClure and Spahr.

When the Jones and Laughlin Company management relocated from 200 Ross Street to the Gateway Center in 1952, the building was purchased by the City of Pittsburgh and other quasi-governmental city agencies like the Urban Redevelopment Authority of Pittsburgh (URA). The City renamed the building the John P. Robin Civic Building, after the first executive director of the URA who rebuilt much of Pittsburgh's downtown in a 1940s and 1950s project dubbed Renaissance I. The URA and the Housing Authority of the City of Pittsburgh (HACP) occupied the upper floors of 200 Ross Street, whereas the lower floors consisted of city personnel and nonprofit organizations. Other government agencies currently located in the former Jones and Laughlin building are the Department of City Planning and the Department of Permits, Licenses, and Inspections. In 2018, the Pittsburgh Post-Gazette reported that the URA was looking to relocate the offices at 200 Ross Street to a new space, but that no decision had been made as to what would happen to the building should the URA find a new space. The building was nominated in November 2019 to become a City of Pittsburgh Historic Landmark by Preservation Pittsburgh.

== Architecture ==
The former Jones and Laughlin building was designed by MacClure & Spahr in the Jacobean Revival style, which was popular in England during the 17th century and can be described as a mix between the more medieval Tudor style and the later Renaissance styles. This architectural style often includes round arches and curved or scrolled, rather than stepped or peaked, gables and parapets. Red brick with stone trim is also commonly found in authentic British examples from the 17th century. The former Jones and Laughlin building is distinctly in the Jacobean Revival style, as the exterior is red brick with sandstone trim and it features numerous rounded arches, such as the one leading into the vestibule on the northwestern facade of the building. The construction for the building was done by the A. & S. Wilson Construction Company, and the steel structure of it was designed by the Jones & Laughlin Company at its Keystone Works structural plant.

== Gallery ==
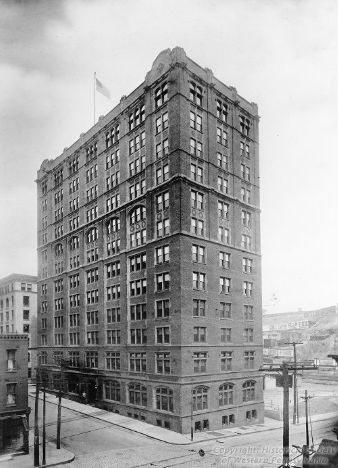
Undated photograph of Jones & Laughlin Building, 200 Ross Street, after 1917 addition.

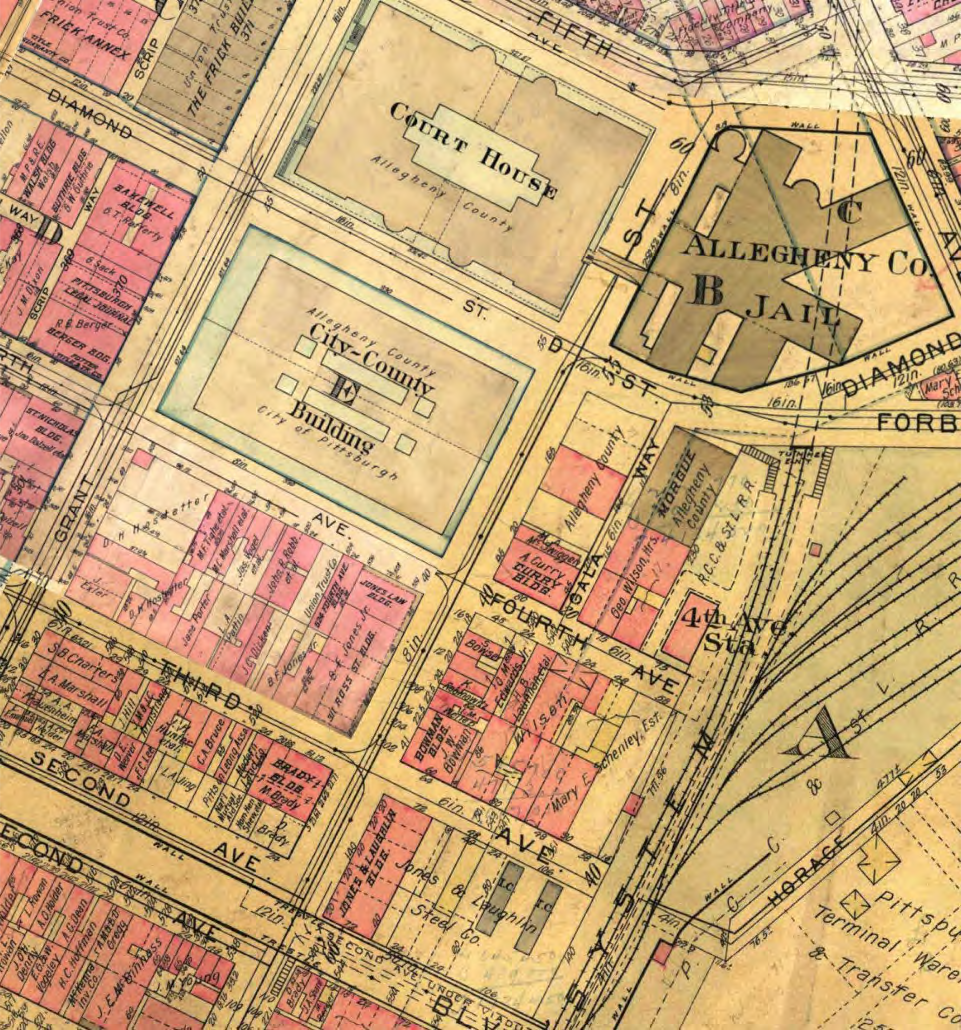
1923 plat map by G.M. Hopkins and Co. Jones & Laughlin Building at bottom center. Jones & Laughlin now owned the entire block bounded by Ross Street, Second Avenue, Third Avenue, and Try Street. City and county government buildings are clustered nearby, presaging the J&L Building's future as a home for municipal agencies.
