= Wattyl =

Australian brand of paints

- Headquarters: Australia
- Number of employees: 1,500
- Parent: Hempel Group
- Website: wattyl.com.au

Wattyl is a brand of architectural, decorative paints, special purpose and protective coatings sold throughout Australia and New Zealand. It is a subsidiary of the Hempel Group.

The company is the second largest brand in Australia for architectural and decorative paints after market leader Dulux.

Wattyl was listed on the Australian Securities Exchange (ASX) from 1959, until it was delisted on 22 September 2010 when all the company was acquired by Valspar. Sherwin-Williams acquired Valspar in 2016, and sold the Wattyl business to Hempel Group in 2021.

As at May 2010 Wattyl employed over 1,500 people in Australia and New Zealand.

Wattyl was the first Australian manufacturer of two pot polyurethanes for the DIY market and a very successful marketing campaign during the 1960s and 1970s led to the brand name Estapol becoming the Australian term for the DIY clear finishing of domestic timber surfaces with one or two pot polyurethane finishes.

The Wattyl range of products include the brands Granosite, Solagard, Estapol and Killrust.

Wattyl is the current main sponsor of the Lake Taupo Cycle Challenge event in New Zealand.

Wattyl is the sleeve sponsor for Canterbury-Bankstown Bulldogs.
