= Preservation Pittsburgh =

American non-profit organization

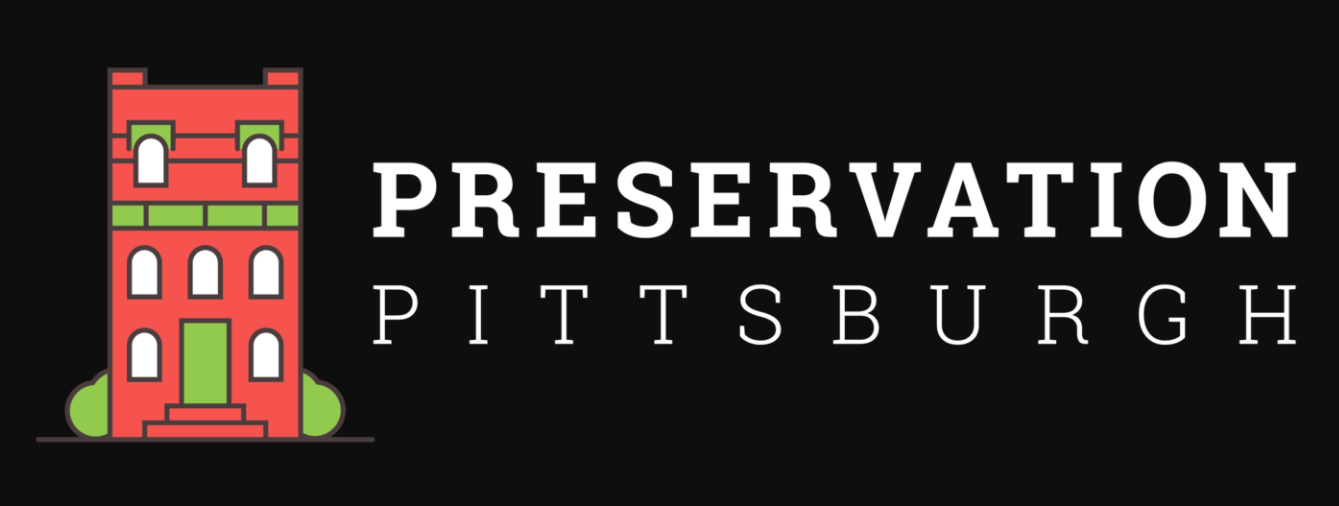
- Type: Non-Profit
- Location: 1501 Reedsdale St, Pittsburgh, Pennsylvania, United States
- Region served: Pittsburgh and Allegheny County, Pennsylvania
- Website: www.preservationpgh.org

Preservation Pittsburgh is a non-profit advocacy group founded in 1991 to support the preservation of historic, architectural, cultural, and environmental sites and buildings within Pittsburgh, Pennsylvania.

== History ==
Founded by Mary J. Paradise, Preservation Pittsburgh's origins lay in efforts to stop the Syria Mosque Concert Hall's demolishment in 1991. The organization emerged out of the public protest campaign titled "Save the Syria Mosque Organization." Although this group sparked "one of the fiercest preservation battles in the city's history," the land was eventually sold to the University of Pittsburgh Medical Center, or UPMC, which constructed a surface parking lot on the site (that still stands today).

In the early 2000s, Preservation Pittsburgh was one of the opponents of Mayor Thomas Murphy's "Fifth and Forbes" revitalization plan. Murphy's original plan would have demolished 62 buildings in the Downtown area. After opposition from Preservation Pittsburgh and the Pittsburgh History & Landmarks Foundation, among others, Murphy opened up the revitalization plan to a broader group of stakeholders, including preservationists and building and business owners.

Preservation Pittsburgh also advocated for the adaptive reuse of the Civic Arena, a contentious site given that it was built by displacing residents in the Hill District, a primarily African American neighborhood, using eminent domain. Preservation Pittsburgh launched the "Civic Minded" design competition for the arena when it faced demolition in 2010, and announced four contest winners. These winners proposed various reuses for the arena: a park that would incorporate part of the arena's dome into the natural landscape, an urban marketplace that would seek to amend the "double injustice of urban renewal and poor food access in the Hill District," a natatorium that would information about the Hill District's history, and a solar-power clad dome that would help power the Lower Hill District. The Civic Arena was demolished in 2011.

== Landmarks ==
According to Preservation Pittsburgh's website, the organization has nominated 35 Pittsburgh sites, structures, and districts for City of Pittsburgh Historic Landmark Designation since 1991. It has also nominated 3 historic districts (two parks and one neighborhood) for the National Register of Historic Places. Most of the nominations are structures, such as the Former Jones & Laughlin Headquarters Building and the Heathside Cottage, but some are also sites, like the Westinghouse Memorial, or districts, like Highland Park.

After a structure, site, or district is nominated for a local designation in Pittsburgh, it must be approved by the Historic Review Commission, which is composed of seven members appointed by the Mayor of Pittsburgh. Matthew Falcone, who is the current president of Preservation Pittsburgh, is also a member of this Historic Review Commission. As of June 2019, 11 of Preservation Pittsburgh's nominations have been approved to be City Landmarks.

== Current Initiatives and Committees ==
Preservation Pittsburgh currently partners with the Pittsburgh Parks Conservancy and the City of Pittsburgh to list three Pittsburgh parks—Frick Park, Highland Park, and Riverview Park—on the National Register of Historic Places. Frick Park and Highland Park were successfully listed on the Register in 2019, and Riverview Park is still under consideration.

The Pittsburgh Modern Committee of Preservation Pittsburgh aims to raise awareness of modern sites in Pittsburgh and advocate for their preservation. The committee frequently gives tours of modern sites in neighborhoods like Downtown Pittsburgh. The committee also assisted in the 2019 book launch for Imagining the Modern: Architecture, Urbanism and the Pittsburgh Renaissance, which followed an exhibit shown at the Heinz Architectural Center in the Carnegie Museum of Art.

The Religious Architectural Heritage Committee focuses on promoting awareness of ecclesiastical architecture, centering on the borough of Wilkinsburg. In October 2018, Neighborhood Allies and other community groups partnered with Preservation Pittsburgh to give a "Sacred Spaces Tour" of churches, mosques, and other historic sites along with art programming. A second "Sacred Spaces Tour" was also held in October 2019, which allowed Wilkinsburg residents and others to watch artistic performances/exhibitions, participate in crafting workshops, and learn about religious sites’ history and architecture. In 2016, Preservation Pittsburgh began advocating for the preservation of the Albright United Methodist Church in Pittsburgh's Bloomfield neighborhood.

Preservation Pittsburgh was also among the groups and individuals advocating for preserving a historic tunnel mosaic by Virgil Cantini, a well-known Pittsburgh artist who founded the University of Pittsburgh's Studio Arts Department. The mosaic was removed in 2019 and the City indicated that it has plans to relocate the artwork to a different location, although Cantini created the mosaic to be featured in the tunnel.
