= Oliver Bath House =

Public swimming pool in Pittsburgh, Pennsylvania

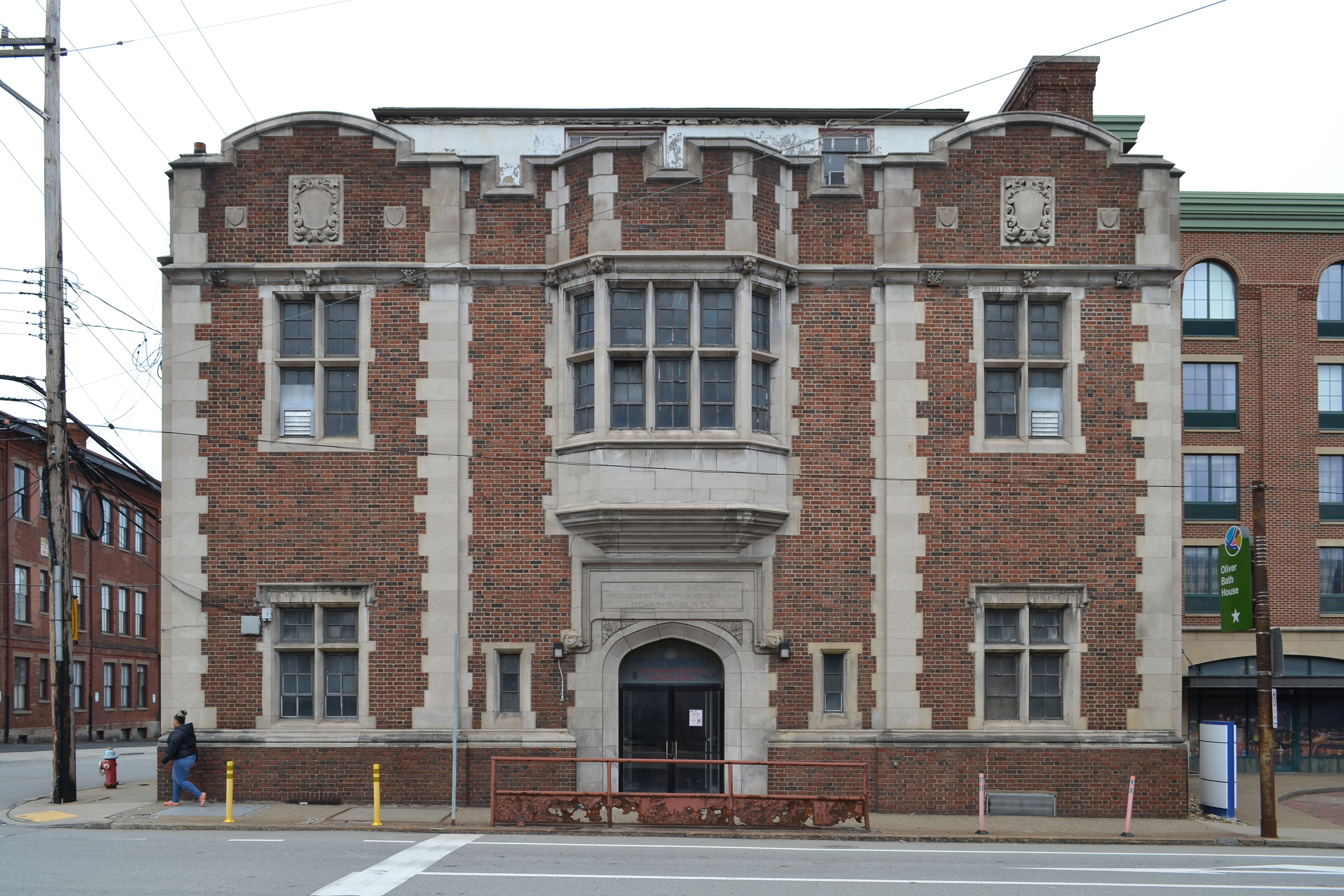
- Oliver Bath House in 2023

- Location within Pittsburgh
- 40°25′46.54″N 79°59′19.83″W
- Location: 38 S 10th Street, South Side Flats, Pittsburgh, Pennsylvania, USA

History
- Built: 1915

Site notes
- Architect(s): Daniel Burnham, MacClure & Spahr
- Governing body: City of Pittsburgh

The Oliver Bath House is located at 38 S 10th Street in the South Side Flats neighborhood of Pittsburgh, Pennsylvania. Built in 1915 in the Tudor Revival and Gothic Collegiate architectural style, the building today serves as a public swimming pool.

== History ==
The first plans for the bath house began in March 1903 with Henry W. Oliver. Oliver was an Irish immigrant who served in the Civil War fighting for the Union. Following the war, Oliver became a wealthy Pittsburgh based industrialist with stakes in the Iron, Coal, Steel, Tin, and Railroad industries. In 1903 he had his nephew, John C. Oliver, deliver a letter to the Select Council of the City of Pittsburgh. This letter stated the desire of the people in the South Side neighborhood for a public bath house, and Oliver promised to deed land to the city and provide a monetary gift in order to create a bath house that would be free for the people to use forever. The gift ended up being around $100,000 in the form of stock in the Consolidated Coal Company, later the Pittsburgh Coal Company. When Oliver announced his plan for constructing and gifting the bath house to the city, there were only 99 public bath houses in the United States. Initial plans for the design of the building were done by architect Daniel Burnham. However, Oliver's death in February 1904 caused the project to be delayed for over a decade. The final architectural plans were completed in 1913 by MacClure and Spahr. Both Oliver's Widow, Edith Anne Oliver, and his daughter, Edith Oliver Rea, signed off on the project in the same year. By June 8 of 1914 the building contract was awarded and construction began soon after. The bath house was deeded to Pittsburgh in May 1915, and the public opening ceremony was held in June of the same year. It was initially called the South Side Bath House, but was later changed to the Oliver Bath House in Henry Oliver's memory.

In February, 2017, the Oliver Bath House was nominated by Preservation Pittsburgh to become a City Historic Landmark. The nomination was approved and the building was designated a landmark on September 14, 2017. That same year, a report commissioned by the city recommended that the Oliver Bath House be closed and sold due to its poor condition. The Pittsburgh City Council ultimately decided not to sell the building and raised funds for a restoration project which was planned to start in spring 2023. After being closed since March 2020 due to the COVID-19 pandemic, the bath house reopened in March 2026 for public use.

== Architecture ==
The Oliver Bath House can be described as both Tudor Revival and Gothic Collegiate. It has been recognized in both the New International Year Book and the Plumbers’ Trade Journal for its significant architecture and plumbing design. The architect who made the original sketch, Daniel H. Burnham, is most known for his work with New York City's Flatiron Building, Washington, D.C.'s Union Station, and his work helping to develop a master plan for Washington, D.C., with his partners. It is unknown how much of his designs made it into the finished product. The architectural firm of MacClure & Spahr were the ones ultimately responsible for the finalized design. They made significant contributions throughout the city of Pittsburgh. Elements of the “period style era” can be seen in most of their works including the Oliver Bath House.

== Gallery ==
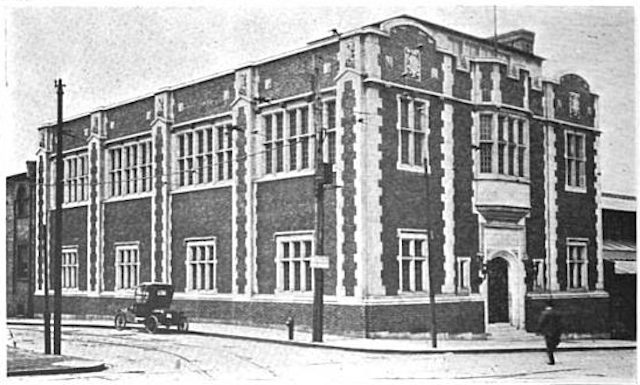
Historic photo of the Oliver Bath House

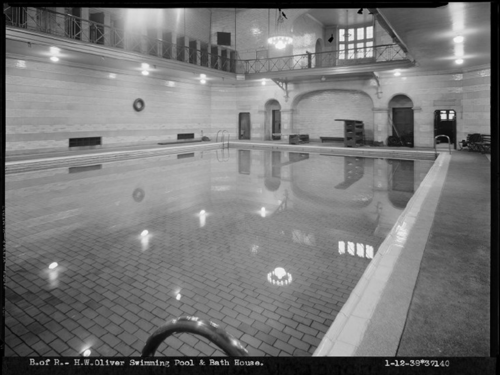
Interior of the Oliver Bath House from 1938

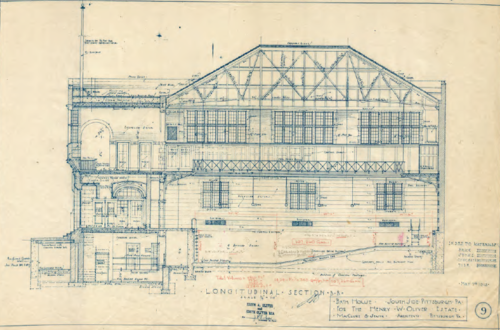
Blueprint sketch of the Oliver Bath House
