= Bristol Paint =

Australian decorating supplies company

- Founded: November 1947
- Founder: S.G. White & J.A. Bate
- Headquarters: Mentone, Victoria, Australia
- Owner: PPG Industries (2007–present)
- Number of employees: >500
- Parent: Barloworld Coatings Australia
- Website: www.bristol.com.au

Bristol Paint is an Australian decorating supplies company. It has 120 stores throughout the country, which employs 500 staff. Bristol Paints was created by S. G. White and J. A. Bate in November 1947.

The company was originally focused on supplying premium paint to trade painters before later expanding into the do-it-yourself market.

Bristol Paint was formerly part of Barloworld Coatings Australia, a subsidiary of South African multinational Barloworld Ltd. In July 2007, PPG Industries Australia Pty. Ltd. announced an agreement to acquire Barloworld Coatings Australia, including the Taubmans, Bristol and White Knight brands of architectural and decorative paint. The acquisition made PPG the largest coatings manufacturer in Australia.

The Australian Competition and Consumer Commission (ACCC) reviewed the transaction and concluded that it was unlikely to substantially lessen competition in the architectural and decorative paint market, given PPG's very limited involvement in that market prior to the merger.

Bristol stores are independently owned and operated by local small business owners under a franchise model, backed by PPG Industries. Products are sold through the Bristol retail network as well as through Bunnings.
