= Pitcairn (surname) =

Pitcairn is a surname of Scottish origin. Notable people with the surname include:

- Alexander Pitcairn (1750–1814), English cricketer
- David Pitcairn (1749–1809), Scottish physician, son of John Pitcairn and brother of the midshipman Robert Pitcairn
- Elizabeth Pitcairn (born 1973), American violinist
- Feodor Pitcairn (1934–2021), American photographer, cinematographer, naturalist and environmentalist, grandson of John Pitcairn and uncle of Elizabeth Pitcairn
- Harold Frederick Pitcairn (1897–1960), American aviation inventor and pioneer
- Hugh Pitcairn (1845–1911), first United States consul general to Hamburg, German Empire, brother of railroad executive Robert Pitcairn and John Pitcairn Jr.
- James Pitcairn (1776–1859), British physician and Director-General of the Medical Department for Ireland
- John Pitcairn (1722–1775), British marine officer during the American Revolutionary War
- John Pitcairn Jr. (1841–1916), Scottish-born American industrialist and philanthropist
- Joseph Pitcairn (1764–1844), American diplomat, landowner and the American consul to the free Hansa city of Hamburg
- Raymond Pitcairn (1885–1966), American lawyer, businessman and politician, son of John Pitcairn Jr.
- Robert Pitcairn (1836–1909), Scottish-American railroad executive
- Robert Pitcairn (antiquary) (1793–1855), British antiquary
- Robert Pitcairn (athlete) (1938–2022), Canadian sport shooter
- Robert Pitcairn (commendator) (1520?–1584), Scottish diplomat and judge
- Robert Pitcairn (Royal Navy officer) (1752–c.1770), Royal Navy midshipman, first European to sight Pitcairn Island, son of marine officer John Pitcairn
- Theodore Pitcairn (1893–1973), American clergyman, theologian, philanthropist and connoisseur of the arts and antiquities, son of the industrialist John Pitcairn
- Thomas Pitcairn (1800–1854), Scottish Presbyterian minister
- William Pitcairn (1712–1791), Scottish physician and botanist, brother of marine officer John Pitcairn
- William Fettes Pitcairn (1804–1891), Scottish theological author
