= Pitcairn (disambiguation) =

The Pitcairn Islands are a British Overseas Territory in the South Pacific.

Pitcairn may also refer to:

== Places ==
- Pitcairn Island, the only inhabited island of the Pitcairn Islands
- Pitcairn, New York, United States, a town
- Pitcairn, Pennsylvania, United States, a borough

== People ==
- Pitcairn (surname), a list of people
- Frank Pitcairn, penname of British journalist Claud Cockburn (1904–1981)

== Other uses ==
- HMS Pitcairn, a British frigate
- Pitcairn (schooner), a schooner launched in 1890 that sailed in the South Pacific
- Pitcairn Aircraft Company, an American mail plane and autogyro manufacturer
  - Pitcairn Aviation
- Pitcairn (horse) (1971–2004), a Thoroughbred racehorse
- Pitcairn (play), a 2014 play by Richard Bean about the Mutiny on the Bounty

== See also ==
- Pitcairn Building, Philadelphia, Pennsylvania, United States, on the National Register of Historic Places
