= HMS Aurora (1766) =

Frigate of the Royal Navy

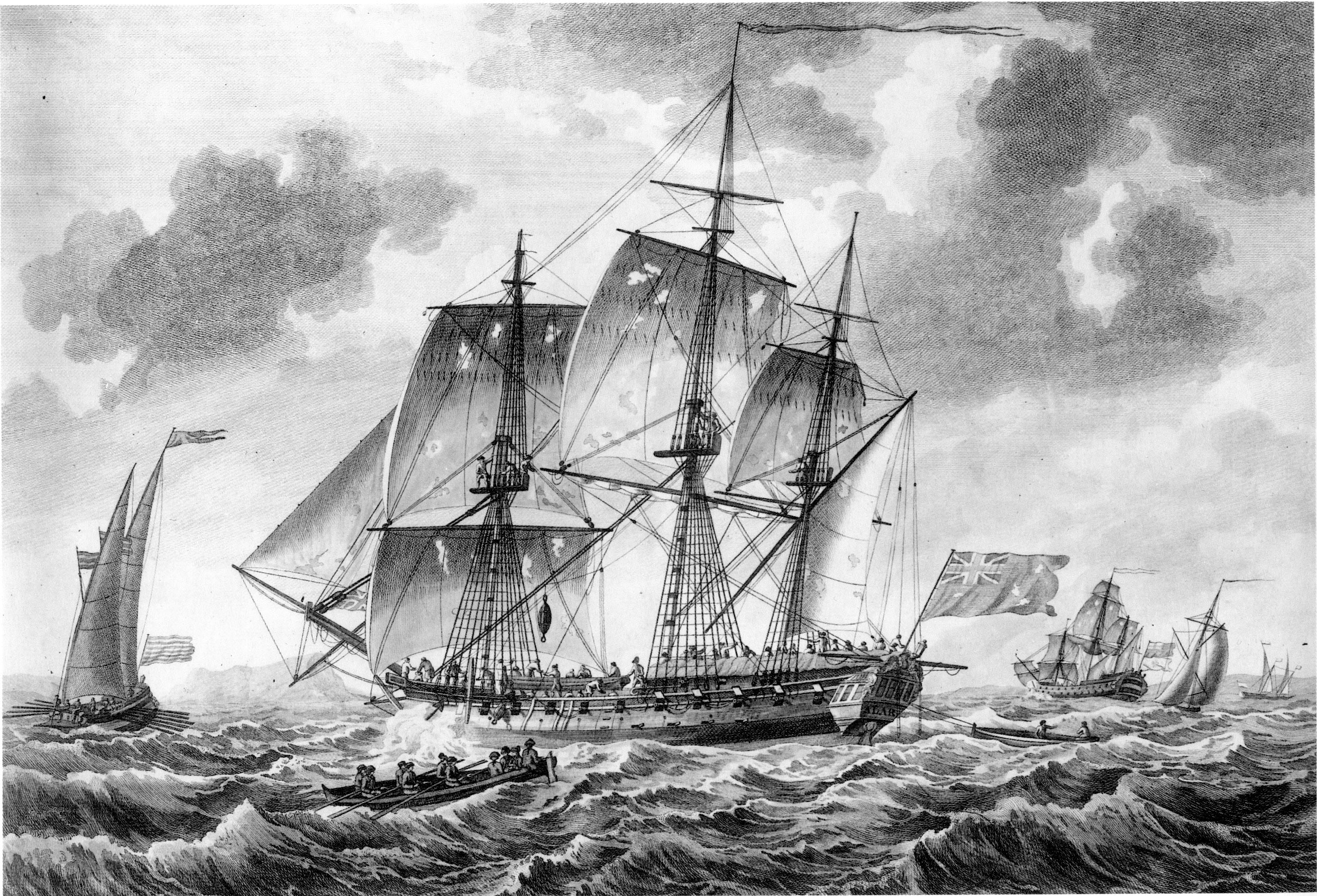
HMS Alarm, a sister ship of HMS Aurora, in 1758

HMS Aurora was a 32-gun fifth-rate frigate of the Royal Navy. The ship was built in Chatham Dockyard and launched on 13 January 1766. She was later purchased and transferred to the East India Company in 1768.

John Monkton was recorded as serving on her prior to September 1769 but was transferred to another ship before her final voyage.

== Disappearance ==
In September 1769, she sailed from England for the East Indies, intending to stop at Anjouan island and Bombay. After calling at the Cape of Good Hope for provisions in December 1769, she disappeared in the Indian Ocean around January 1770, presumably sunk by fire, storm or wrecked off Madagascar. It was later reported that some large anchors and cannons, likely of British manufacture were found close to Star Bank off Madagascar and these may have been from the ship.

Among those notable members of the crew who disappeared with her was Robert Pitcairn from which the Pitcairn Islands take their name. William Falconer, a noted poet and marine dictionary writer, was also among those lost at sea. He was assigned as the ship's purser.
