= Feodor Pitcairn =

American photographer (1934–2021)

- Born: July 13, 1934 (age 92)
- Occupation: Fine Art Landscape Photographer
- Notable work: Exhibits "Iceland Revealed: Primordial Landscapes," "Ocean Odyssey" Books: Cayman: Underwater Paradise, Hidden Seascapes, Dreaming Wild in the Heart of the Pennypack, Primordial Landscapes: Iceland Revealed
- Awards: 2008 Best of Nature - Jules Verne Film Festival; 2008 Best Cinematography - International Wildlife Film Festival; Best of 3D - BLUE Ocean Film Festival

Feodor Pitcairn (July 13, 1934 – May 13, 2021) was an American photographer, cinematographer, naturalist, environmentalist, and ocean conservation advocate.

== Life and work ==
Photographing nature since his teens, Pitcairn was deeply influenced by a trip to Africa in 1951. Pitcairn was a pioneer in the use of digital cameras for underwater cinematography. He was the photographer for a series of five documentaries “Ocean Wilds” (2001) which aired on The Public Broadcasting Service (PBS). Pitcairn is noted for his HD film Ocean Odyssey, commissioned for the Smithsonian Museum of Natural History in Washington, D.C., projected onto eight screens surrounding Sant Ocean Hall from 2008 to 2016. Pitcairn’s photographs from his published work Primordial Landscapes: Iceland Revealed were featured in a major installation at the Smithsonian Museum of Natural History lasting two years. This exhibit focusing on Iceland was in connection with the U.S. taking on the role of chair in the Arctic Council, an international effort addressing issues of the region.

In 2013, Pitcairn established the Landscapes for Life & Healing initiative, which aims to install nature images into medical facilities in order to soothe the patients and employees within the high-stress environment. Landscapes for Life & Healing installations have been completed in Abington Hospital–Jefferson Health, Cancer Treatment Centers of America, Philadelphia, and Asplundh Cancer Pavilion.

== Exhibitions ==
- "Galapagos: Born of the Sea", Smithsonian Institution National Museum of Natural History before touring for four years as a Smithsonian Institution Traveling Exhibit 1981
- Ocean Odyssey, a high definition film projected onto eight screens surrounding Sant Ocean Hall, Smithsonian Institution National Museum of Natural History 2008
- Photographic displays in three locations at the BLUE Ocean Film Festival and Portola Hotel, Monterey, California, 2012
- Fine art prints (140 prints) from Feo Pitcairn Fine Art, commissioned by Abington Memorial Hospital, Abington, Pennsylvania, 2013
- “Polaris: Northern Explorations in Contemporary Art”, James A. Michener Art Museum, Doylestown, Pennsylvania, January 14, 2017 – April 23, 2017
- “Iceland Revealed: Primordial Landscapes” (featuring 43 of Feodor Pitcairn’s images with poetic and geological texts written by Ari Trausti Guðmundsson), Smithsonian Institution National Museum of Natural History, Washington, D.C., July 2, 2015 – April 2017

== Television and film ==
- 2001 Ocean Wilds by Feodor Pitcairn Productions (5-part mini-series on television)
- 2007 Ocean Voyagers, narrated by Meryl Streep
- 2008 Ocean Odyssey, HD film from the installation at the Smithsonian Institution National Museum of Natural History
- 2010 Ocean Voyagers re-released in 3D with PassmoreLab

== Photography books ==
- Cayman: Underwater Paradise (Reef Dwellers Press, 1979, ISBN 0960253009; ISBN 978-0960253005)
- Hidden Seascapes (New York Graphic Society, 1984, ISBN 0316342963; ISBN 978-0316342964)
- Dreaming Wild in the Heart of the Pennypack (Pennypack/Covington, 2001, ISBN 0972638105; ISBN 978-0972638104)
- Primordial Landscapes: Iceland Revealed (powerHouse Books, 2015, ISBN 9781576877807)

== Awards ==
- 2008 – Best of Nature – Ocean Voyagers, Jules Verne Film Festival
- 2013 – Finalist in the Soho Photo Gallery 18th Annual National Photographic Competition
- 2008 – Best Cinematography – Ocean Voyagers, International Wildlife Film Festival
- 2011 – Best of 3D – Ocean Voyagers 3D, New Media Film Festival San Francisco
- 2012 – Finalist for Best 3D Film – "Ocean Voyagers", BLUE Ocean Film Festival

== Environmental work ==
- Member and supporter of Ocean Conservancy
- Director Emeritus, Pennypack Ecological Restoration Trust

== Family ==
Feodor Pitcairn is one of nine children born to Theodore Pitcairn and Maryke Pitcairn. He is the grandson of PPG Industries founder John Pitcairn and his wife Gertrude. Concert violinist Elizabeth Pitcairn is his niece. Feodor Pitcairn married Kirstin Odhner (July 12, 1935 - October 3, 2008) and together they had four children.
