= David Pitcairn =

Scottish physician

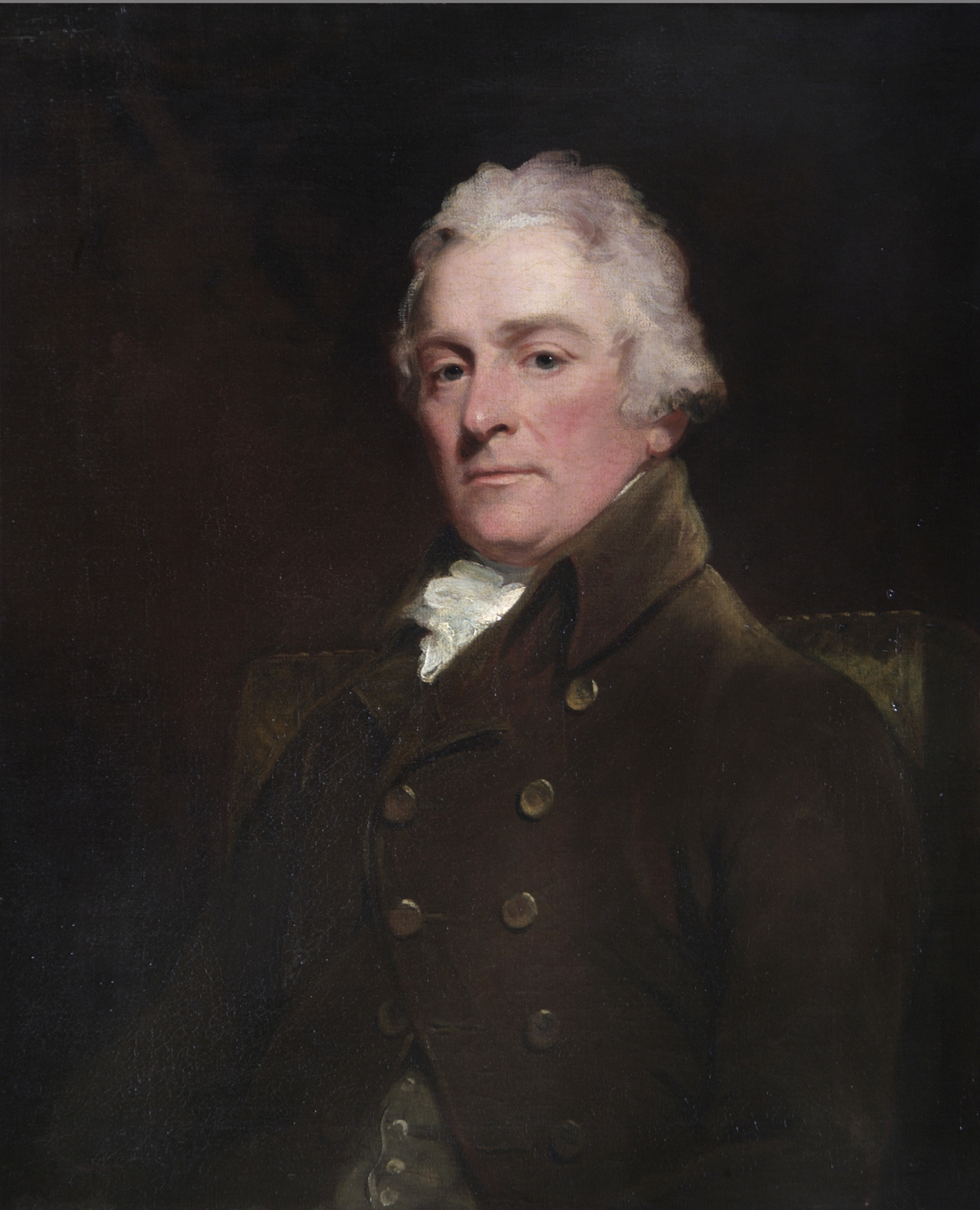
- David Pitcairn, c. 1800
- Born: 1749; Fife, Scotland
- Died: 17 April 1809 (aged 59–60); London, England
- Occupation: Physician

David Pitcairn M.D. (1749–1809) was a Scottish physician.

== Life ==
Born on 1 May 1749 in Fife, he was eldest son of Major John Pitcairn, who was killed at the battle of Bunker's Hill; Robert Pitcairn (1752–c. 1770) was his brother. He was sent to Edinburgh High School, the university of Glasgow, and then to the University of Edinburgh. He went on in 1773 to Corpus Christi College, Cambridge, where he graduated M.B. in 1779 and M.D. in 1784.

In 1779 Pitcairn began practice in London, and was elected a fellow of the Royal College of Physicians on 15 Aug. 1785. He was five times censor, and in 1786 was also Gulstonian lecturer and Harveian orator. On the resignation of his uncle William Pitcairn, he was, on 10 February 1780, elected physician to St Bartholomew's Hospital, and held the post till 1793, when he resigned. He attained a large private practice. John Latham mentioned, in his treatise on gout and rheumatism, that David Pitcairn was the first to discover that valvular disease of the heart was a frequent result of rheumatic fever, and that he made his discovery known in his teaching at St. Bartholomew's Hospital. On 11 April 1782 he was elected a Fellow of the Royal Society.

== Last years and death ==
Pitcairn had frequent attacks of quinsy, and failing health, accompanied by hæmoptysis, in 1798, forced him to give up work and spend eighteen months in Portugal. He returned to England and continued to practise, but on 13 April 1809 had an attack of sore throat, followed by acute inflammation of the larynx, with consequent œdema of the glottis, of which he died on 17 April 1809, at Craig's Court, Charing Cross. Matthew Baillie, a close friend for 30 years, attended him, and described his case, with the similar one of John Macnamara Hayes, who died of the same disease three months later. Pitcairn's body was examined by Benjamin Collins Brodie the elder, in the presence of Baillie, Everard Home, and William Charles Wells.

Pitcairn was buried in the family vault in the church of St Bartholomew the Less, without the walls of St. Bartholomew's Hospital, London. A tablet to his memory was erected in the church of Hadham Magna, Hertfordshire.

== Family ==
Pitcairn married Elizabeth, daughter of William Almack.

== Notes ==
Attribution

This article incorporates text from a publication now in the public domain: Lee, Sidney, ed. (1896). "Pitcairn, David". Dictionary of National Biography. Vol. 45. London: Smith, Elder & Co.
