= William Fettes Pitcairn =

Scottish theological author

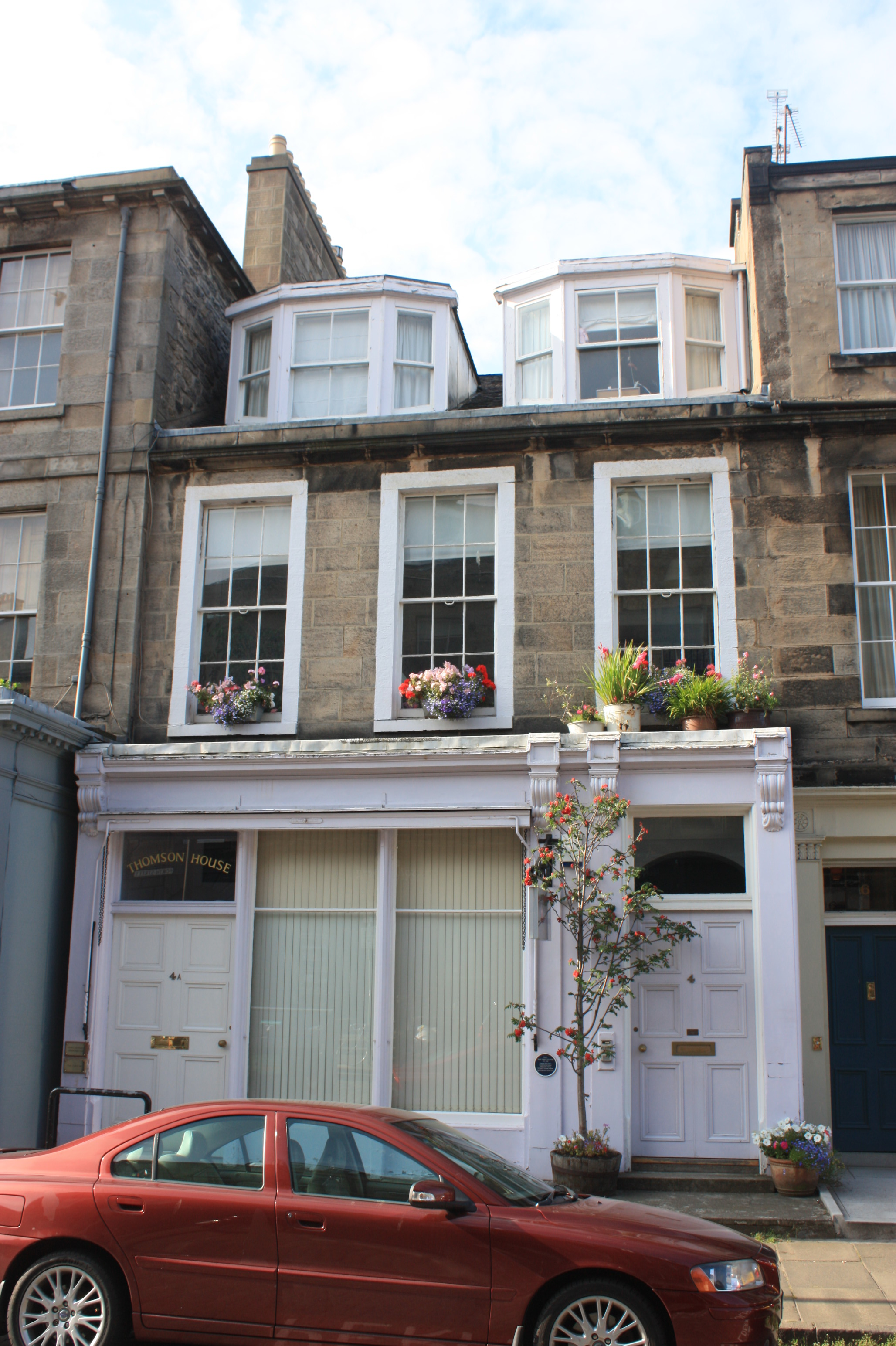
4 Forth Street, Edinburgh

William Fettes Pitcairn (14 October 1803 – 25 September 1891) was a Scottish theological author.

== Life ==
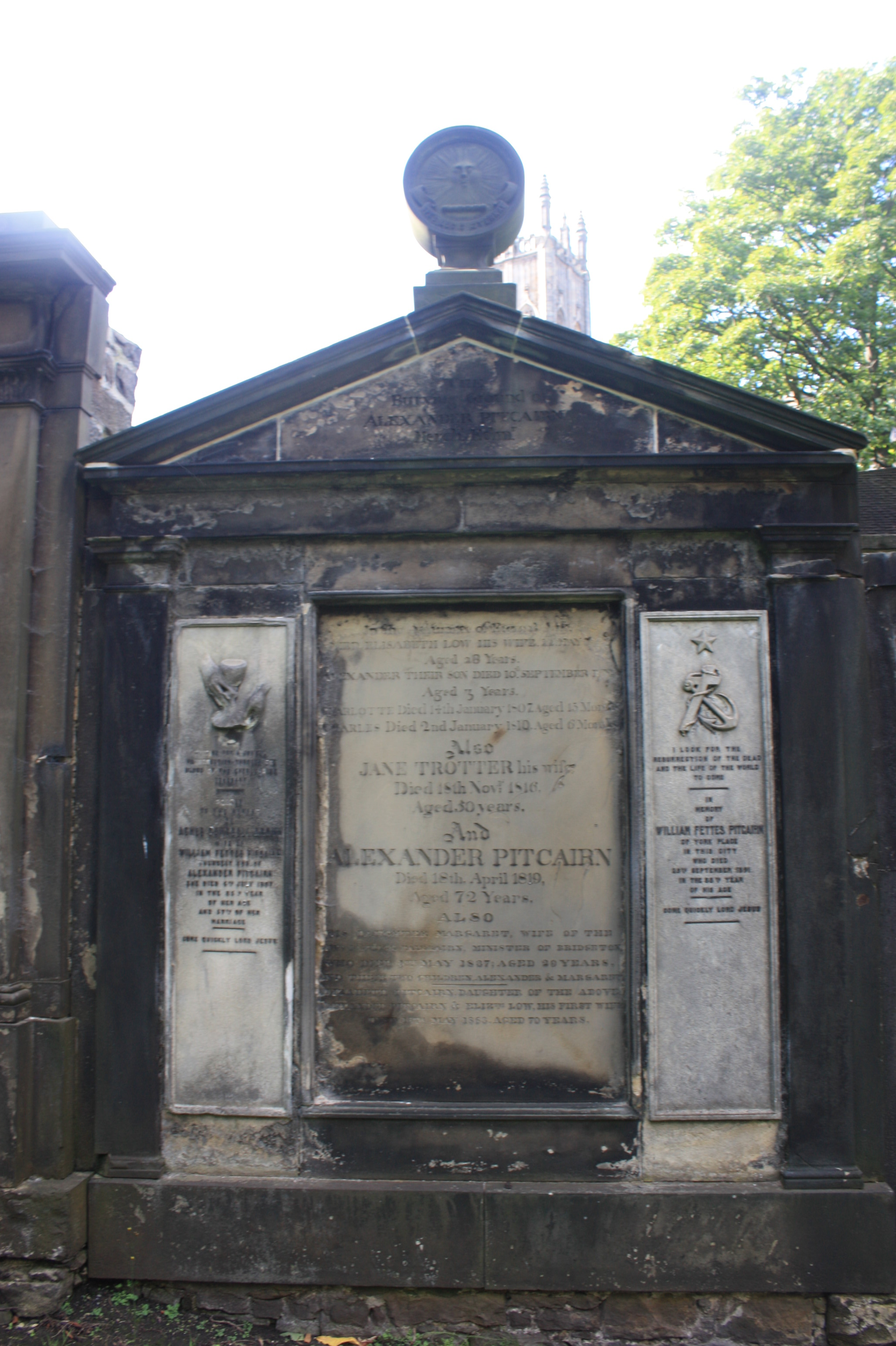
The Pitcairn grave, St Cuthberts Churchyard, Edinburgh

Pitcairn was born in Edinburgh on 14 October 1803, the son of Alexander Pitcairn (1746–1819), a wealthy merchant, by his second wife, Jane Trotter. He was first cousin to Robert Pitcairn. The family lived at 4 Forth Street, then a newly built Georgian townhouse in the eastern part of Edinburgh's New Town (still existing but somewhat altered).

He appears to have trained as a lawyer. He lived much of his life with his parents but by 1860 is living independently at 19 Forth Street, a few doors from his family home.

He died on 25 September 1891 at his home 30 York Place in Edinburgh's New Town

Pitcairn is buried in St Cuthbert's Churchyard at the west end of Princes Street. He lies on a main dividing wall within the churchyard, to the north-west of the church, with his grandfather Alexander Pitcairn.

== Publications ==
- Selection of Homilies (1849)
- Pastoral Letter, Easter (various years)
- The Passion and Resurrection of the Lord (1867)
- The Catholic Apostolic Church (1874)
