= Hugh Pitcairn =

American diplomat (1845–1911)

Hugh Pitcairn (August 16, 1845 – July 19, 1911) served as the first United States consul general to Hamburg, German Empire, from 1903 to 1908. He was the brother of Pennsylvania railroad magnate Robert Pitcairn and industrialist John Pitcairn.

== Early life ==
Pitcairn was born in Johnstone, Renfrewshire, Scotland, to John Pitcairn Sr. (1803–1884) and Agnes McEwan. He was one of six children resulting from the marriage, and also had two older half-siblings from his father's first marriage.

In 1846, he emigrated with his family to Allegheny, Pennsylvania, where his uncle, Alexander Pitcairn, had started a woolens business.

He received a public school education in Allegheny and Altoona, Pennsylvania. He began his career in the railroad service, and held a series of executive positions in the field: first as superintendent of the Susquehanna Division of the Northern Central Railway, in 1866; then as superintendent of the Lehigh and Susquehanna Railroad in 1868, next as superintendent of the Evansville, Henderson and Nashville Railroad in 1870, and finally, as superintendent of the Pittsburg, Cincinnati and St. Louis Railway from 1872 to 1875.

Pitcairn then went back to school to study medicine, and following graduation from Hahnemann Medical College of Philadelphia, Pennsylvania, in 1880, spent two years in post graduate study at the Universities of Berlin and Vienna. He then practiced medicine in Harrisburg from 1880 to 1897.

In 1875, Pitcairn purchased a half interest the Altoona Tribune, a Pennsylvania daily newspaper. He was to retain this share until his death.

== Political career ==
A Republican, Pitcairn was quite active in local and state politics. On July 28, 1897, he was appointed by President William McKinley to the post of consul to Hamburg. He was promoted by President Theodore Roosevelt to the post of consul general on January 5, 1903, and confirmed by the U.S. Senate on February 12, 1903. He was the first person to hold this post for Hamburg. He retired from the consulate in November 1908 to the reported regret of the citizens of Hamburg, in order to devote his full attention to the practice of medicine and his duties as partial owner of the Altoona Tribune.

== Later life and death ==
Pitcairn died in Hamburg, on July 19, 1911. He was survived by his wife and five children.
