= Robert Pitcairn (Royal Navy officer) =

Scottish midshipman in the Royal Navy, Pitcairn Island namesake (1752 – c. 1770)

- Born: 6 May 1752; Burntisland, Fife, Scotland, Great Britain
- Died: 1770 (aged c.18); Indian Ocean
- Occupation: Midshipman
- Parent(s): John Pitcairn; Elizabeth Dalrymple

Robert Pitcairn (6 May 1752 – c. 1770) was a Scottish midshipman in the Royal Navy. Pitcairn Island was named after him; he was the first person to spot the island, on 2 July 1767 (ship's time), while serving in a voyage in the South Pacific on HMS Swallow, captained by Philip Carteret.

== Early life and family ==
Robert's father, John Pitcairn

Pitcairn was born in Burntisland, Fife, in 1752. His father, John Pitcairn (1722–1775), was a major in the Royal Marines who commanded the British advance party at the Battle of Lexington where the "shot heard round the world" was fired, and who died from wounds after the Battle of Bunker Hill in 1775. His paternal grandfather, David Pitcairn, was a clergyman at Dysart, Fife, and his paternal grandmother Katherine was the daughter of William Hamilton. His mother Elizabeth (1724–1809) was the daughter of Robert Dalrymple. His uncle William Pitcairn (1712–91) was a doctor at St Bartholomew's Hospital in London.

Among his eight siblings (four other sons and four daughters) were:

- His brother David Pitcairn (1749–1809) became a doctor at St Bartholomew's Hospital in London.
- His sister Catherine Pitcairn married Charles Cochrane, a British Army officer. Cochrane died in 1781 shortly after arriving as aide-de-camp to Cornwallis at Yorktown. He was the son of Thomas Cochrane, 8th Earl of Dundonald, and first cousin of Admiral Thomas Cochrane, 10th Earl of Dundonald.
- His sister Anne was the mother of Sir John Campbell (1780–1863).

== Naval career ==
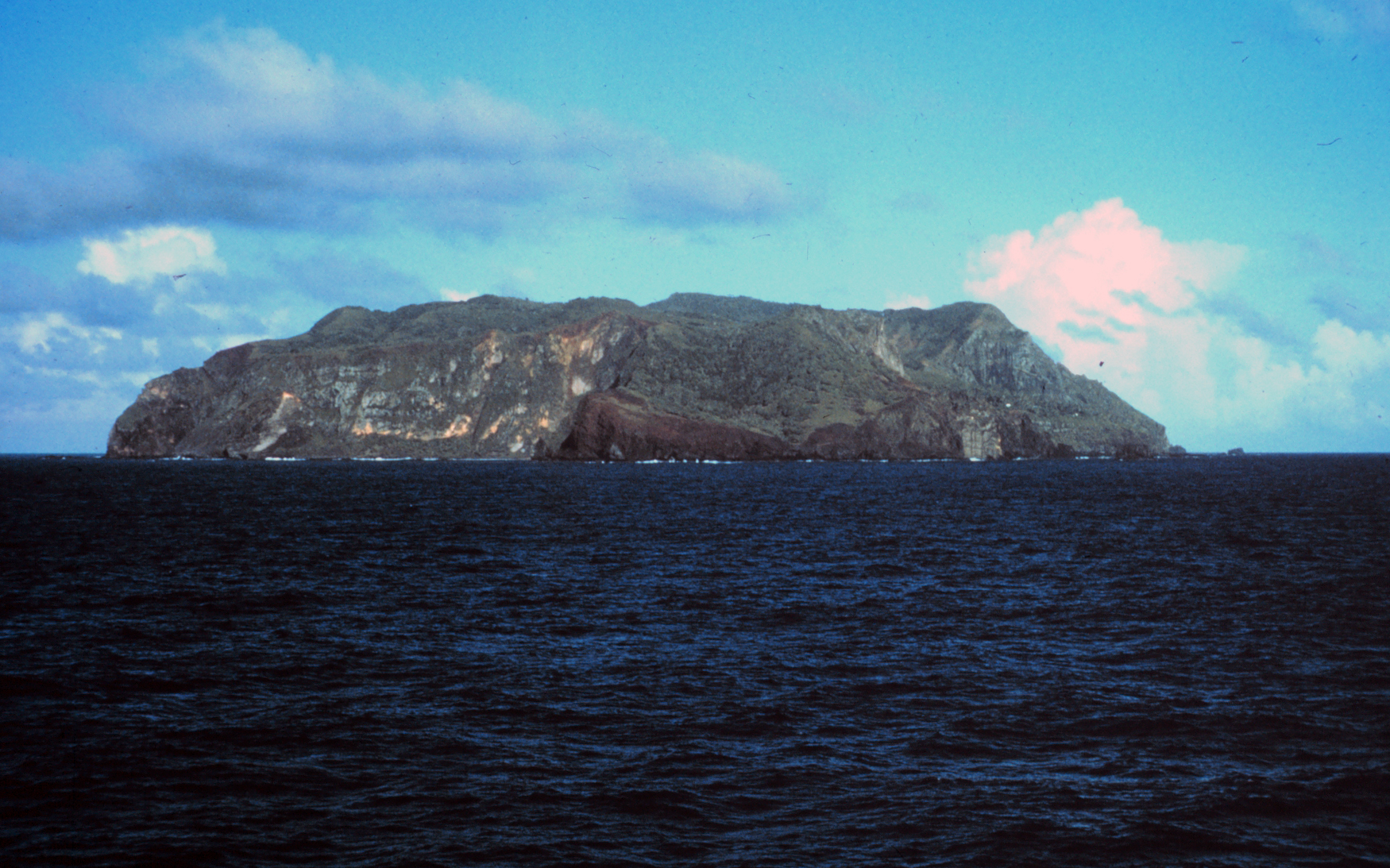
Pitcairn Island in the South Pacific

Pitcairn served on HMS Emerald, a 32-gun fifth-rate ship, and then joined HMS Swallow in July 1766 as a midshipman (the ship's pay-book listed him as aged 19, but baptismal records show he was only 14). The ship, a 14-gun sixth-rate sloop, sailed under Philip Carteret on a voyage of exploration in the South Pacific, accompanying HMS Dolphin commanded by Samuel Wallis. The two ships were parted shortly after sailing through the Strait of Magellan. Carteret took a more southerly route through the Pacific Ocean, and so failed to find much new land, while Wallis took a more northerly route and became the first clearly documented European vessel to land at Tahiti in June 1767.

On Thursday, 2 July 1767 (according to the ship's records; 1 July according to the civil calendar), Pitcairn was the first person on the Swallow to spot an island in the Pacific. He was just fifteen at this time. The island was described by Carteret as "small high uninhabited island, not above 4 or 5 miles round ... scarce better than a large rock in the Ocean" and was named "Pitcairn's Island" after the midshipman. High volcanic cliffs prevented the voyagers landing on the island. Recorded (erroneously) at a 25°02′S 133°21′W, the incorrect coordinates meant that the island could not be found again by later voyages, but from its description and general location it is considered to be Pitcairn Island, which actually lies 327.4 kilometres (203.4 mi) further east, at 25°04′S 130°06′W. The 3° longitude error may be explained by Carteret sailing without the benefit of the new marine chronometer.

Pitcairn arrived back in England on the Swallow in March 1769. He left the Swallow in May 1769, and joined the East India Company ship HMS Aurora, a 32-gun fifth-rate frigate, commanded by Captain Thomas Lee.

== Disappearance ==
He sailed from England on Aurora in September, and called at the Cape of Good Hope in December 1769. The ship made for the Comoros Islands, but disappeared without trace. It may have been sunk in a tropical storm, or wrecked on the Star Bank off the south coast of Madagascar in early 1770.

== See also ==
- List of people who disappeared mysteriously at sea
