= Robert Pitcairn =

American businessman (1836–1909)

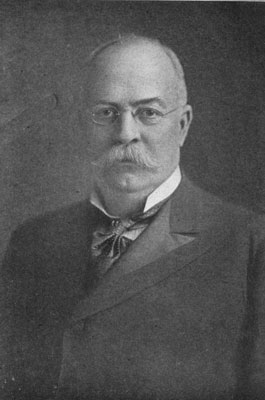
Robert Pitcairn

Robert Pitcairn (May 6, 1836 – July 25, 1909) was a Scottish-American railroad executive who headed the Pittsburgh Division of the Pennsylvania Railroad in the late 19th century. He was the brother of the Pittsburgh Plate Glass Company (now PPG Industries, Inc.) co-founder, John Pitcairn, Jr.

== Early life ==
Pitcairn was born in Johnstone, Renfrewshire, Scotland on May 6, 1836. Ten years later he accompanied his parents and five siblings to the United States aboard the ship Venice, landing at Philadelphia on October 1, 1846. The family continued their journey west, almost certainly via the Pennsylvania Main Line of Public Works (Pennsylvania Main Line Canal) which had been opened in 1834. Upon reaching Pittsburgh they settled across the Allegheny River in Allegheny City.

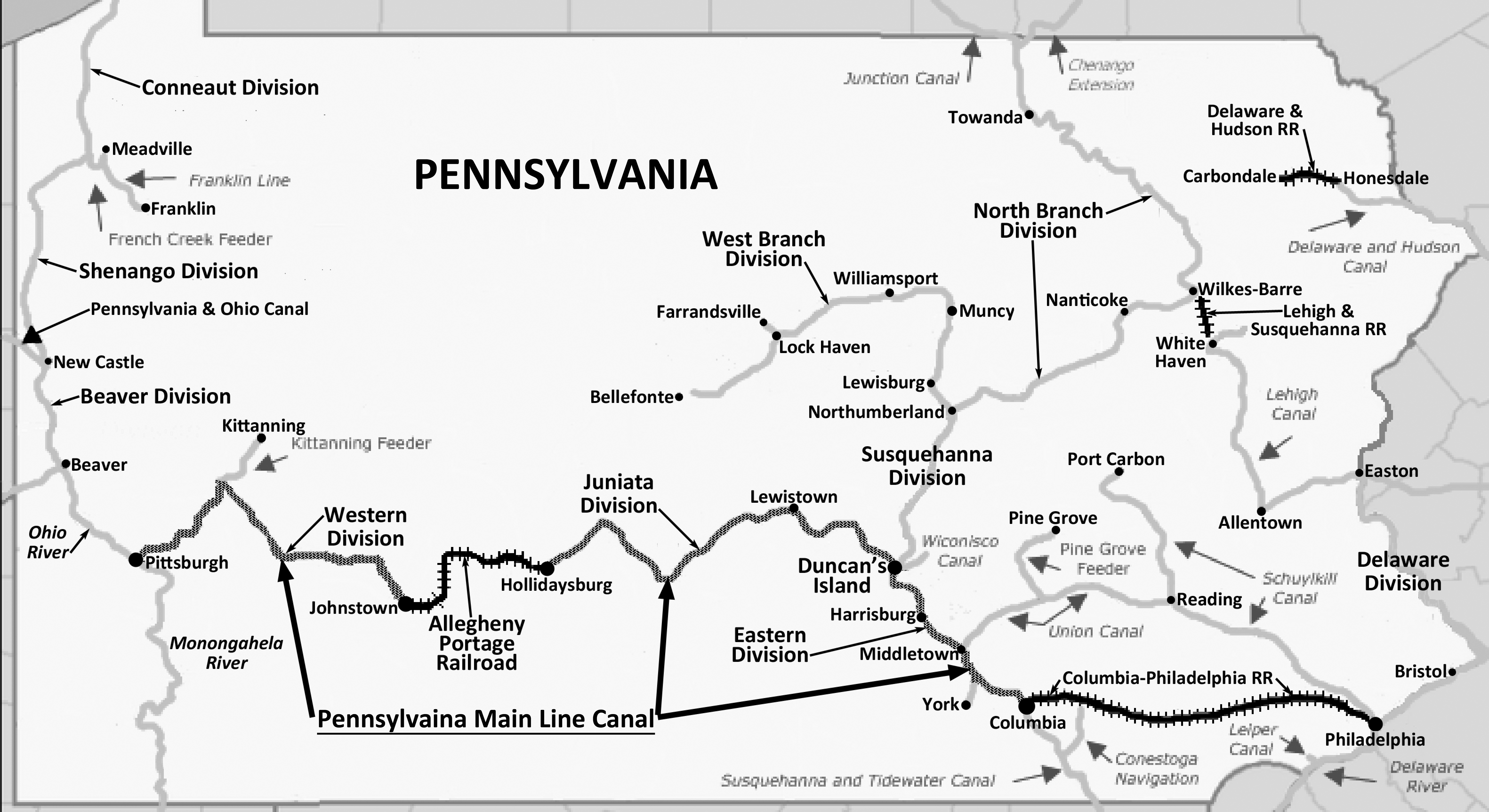
Historic canals of Pennsylvania in the 19th Century, with the Pennsylvania Main Line Canal highlighted. Not all canals existed simultaneously.

Two years later, in September 1848, another Scottish family joined the Pitcairns in Allegheny City. Will and Margaret Carnegie and their sons, Andrew and Thomas, arrived after landing in New York City and traveling via the Hudson River, Erie Canal and a series of other water routes to Pittsburgh. The Pitcairn boys, Robert (12), John (7), and Hugh (3), became close friends with Andrew (12) and Thomas (4) Carnegie.

== Personal life ==
While Robert Pitcairn was working for the Pennsylvania Railroad in Altoona, he met Elizabeth Erb Rigg. On July 26, 1856, the couple married. Robert was 20 years old, and Elizabeth was just 15. Their first child, Agnes Laurene, was born on June 21, 1857, and another daughter, Lillian, followed on December 19, 1858. Two more children followed after the Civil War—Susan Blanche Pitcairn on March 19, 1868, and Robert Pitcairn Jr. on October 2, 1874.

A community Sunday School had been meeting in members’ homes since 1860, but grew too large for that arrangement. On August 10, 1866, 12 men, including Robert Pitcairn, met to plan a dedicated church building. By the end of the meeting, they had pledged $4,550 to purchase land and erect a building for Presbyterian worship, including a “Sabbath School and a select weekday school.” By the end of August, pledges had doubled, a charter and constitution had been drafted, and a 1.5-acre lot had been purchased from Thomas Aiken for $3,000. On September 1, the nascent church applied to the Allegheny County Court of Common Pleas for a charter, and on September 12, a petition for the organization of a church was sent to the Presbytery of Ohio.

Without waiting for formal approvals, construction of the building that would be the first Shadyside Presbyterian Church began on August 27, 1866. The Court granted the requested charter on September 29, 1866.

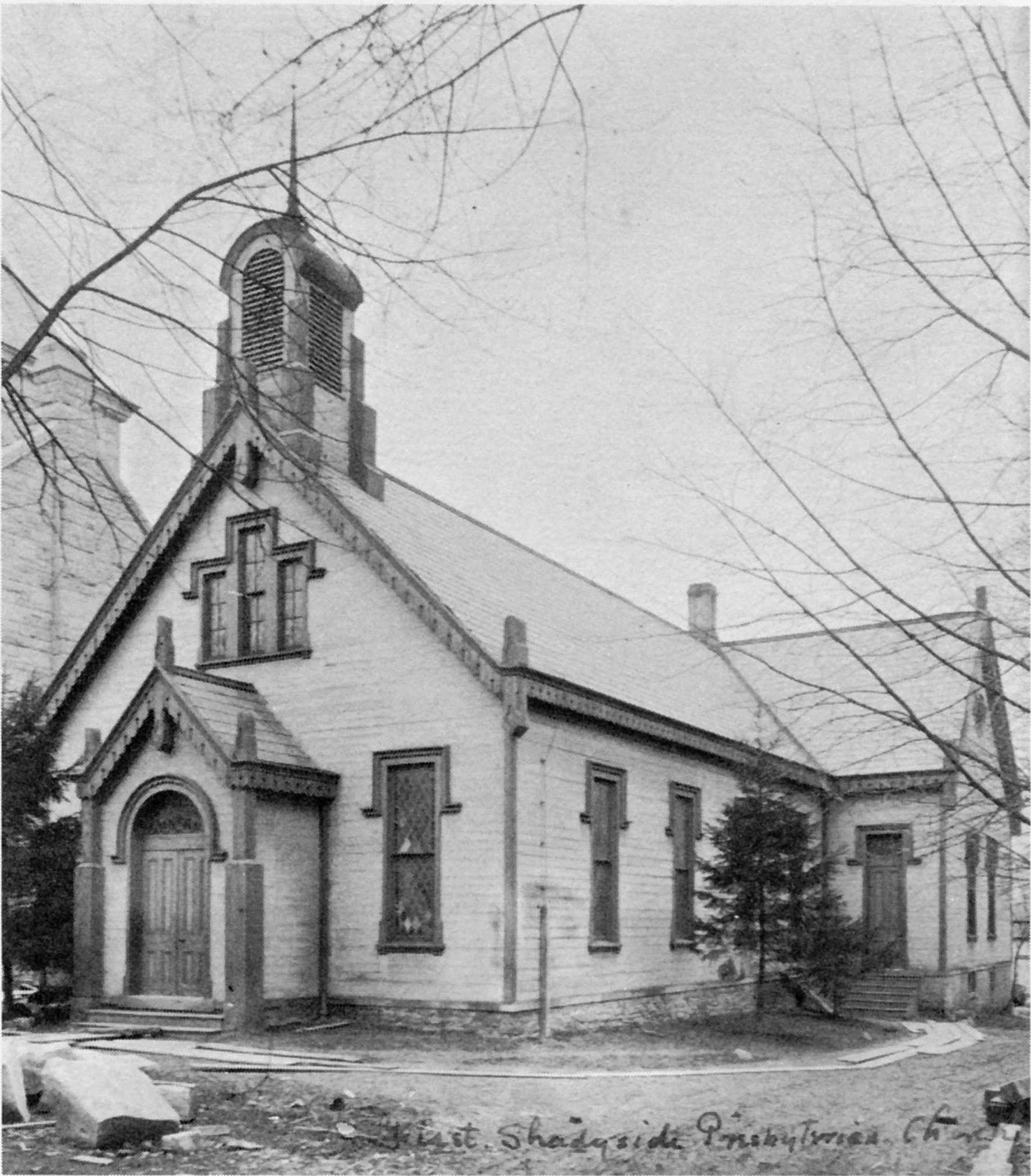
First Shadyside Presbyterian Church, circa 1890--Permission Shadyside Presbyterian Church

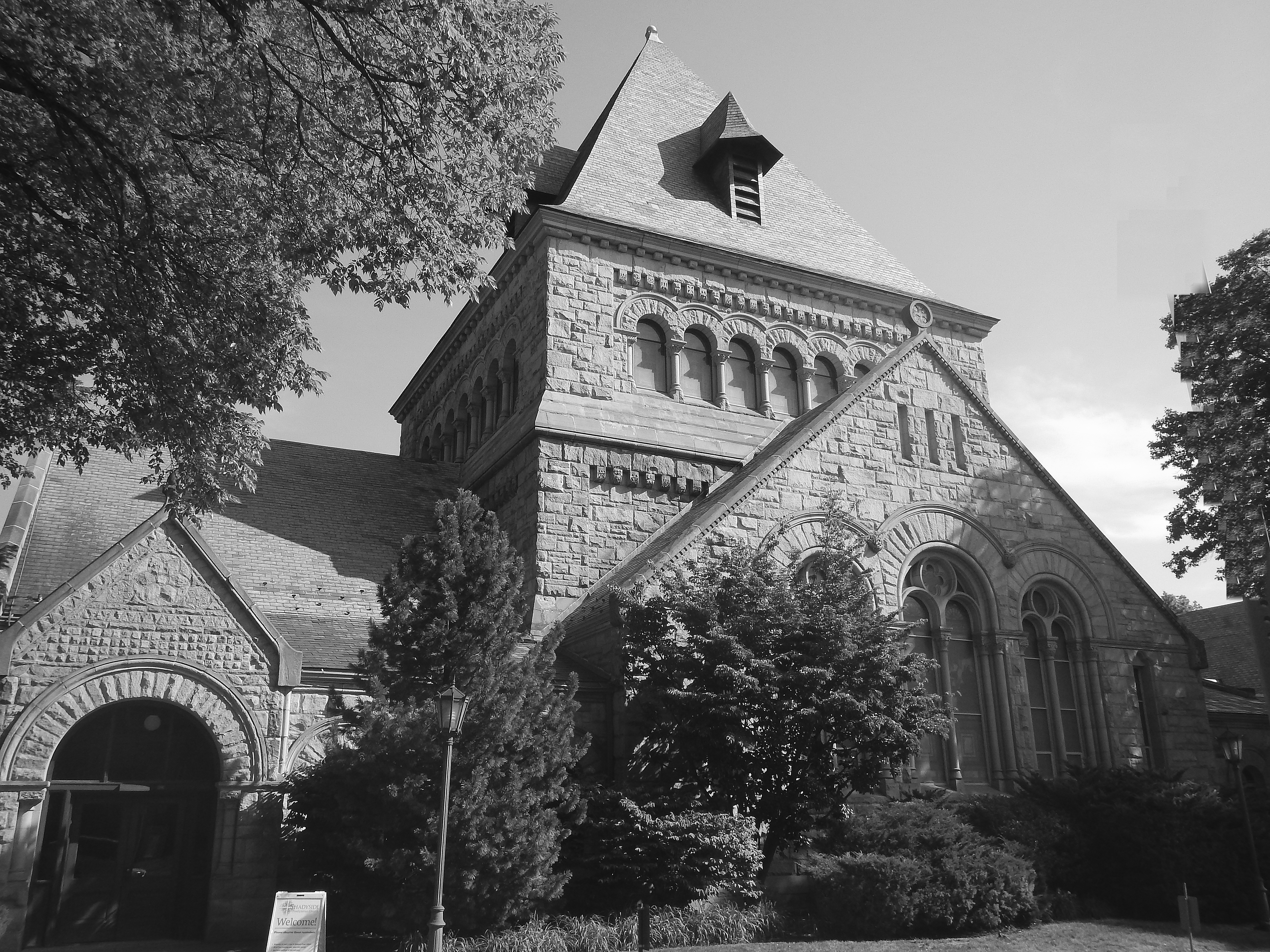
Shadyside Presbyterian Church as it appears today

The first church building was at the corner of Amberson Avenue and Westminster Streets in Shadyside. While waiting for the church building to be completed, Robert Pitcairn arranged for the congregation to use the Pennsylvania Railroad station in Shadyside for their Sunday evening worship services. The railroad station served as a church meeting hall from September 9, 1866, until July 7, 1867. The meetings there were described as “regularly sustained, largely attended and productive of much good.” Music was an integral part of services, even at the railroad station. Robert was appointed choir leader. Finally, on July 8, 1867, the church building was completed, and a large group of supporters met to consecrate the facility, which had pews to accommodate 375 people.

Continued growth in the congregation led to the construction of a second church building, which was completed in 1875.

Robert became a fixture in the church’s leadership. Following is a tabulation of Robert’s official roles at the church:

== Position Dates ==
Sunday School Superintendent Intermittently for 12 years total, starting Sept 1868; ending March 1903

Deacon April 27, 1873, to his death in 1909; 36 years total

President of Board of Trustees 1881 to 1882

Ruling Elder April 2, 1882, to his death in 1909; 27 years total

Robert said in July 1891, “I feel that I can with truth say … to the promoters of this great enterprise, which has so blessed this neighborhood—those conservative men and women who gave up their beloved and cherished [church] homes, denominational preferences, and saw that their duty was at home and with their neighbors … and now I expect to live and die in my adopted church home, and can say with truth, that everything I am and have I owe to the Shadyside Presbyterian Church.”

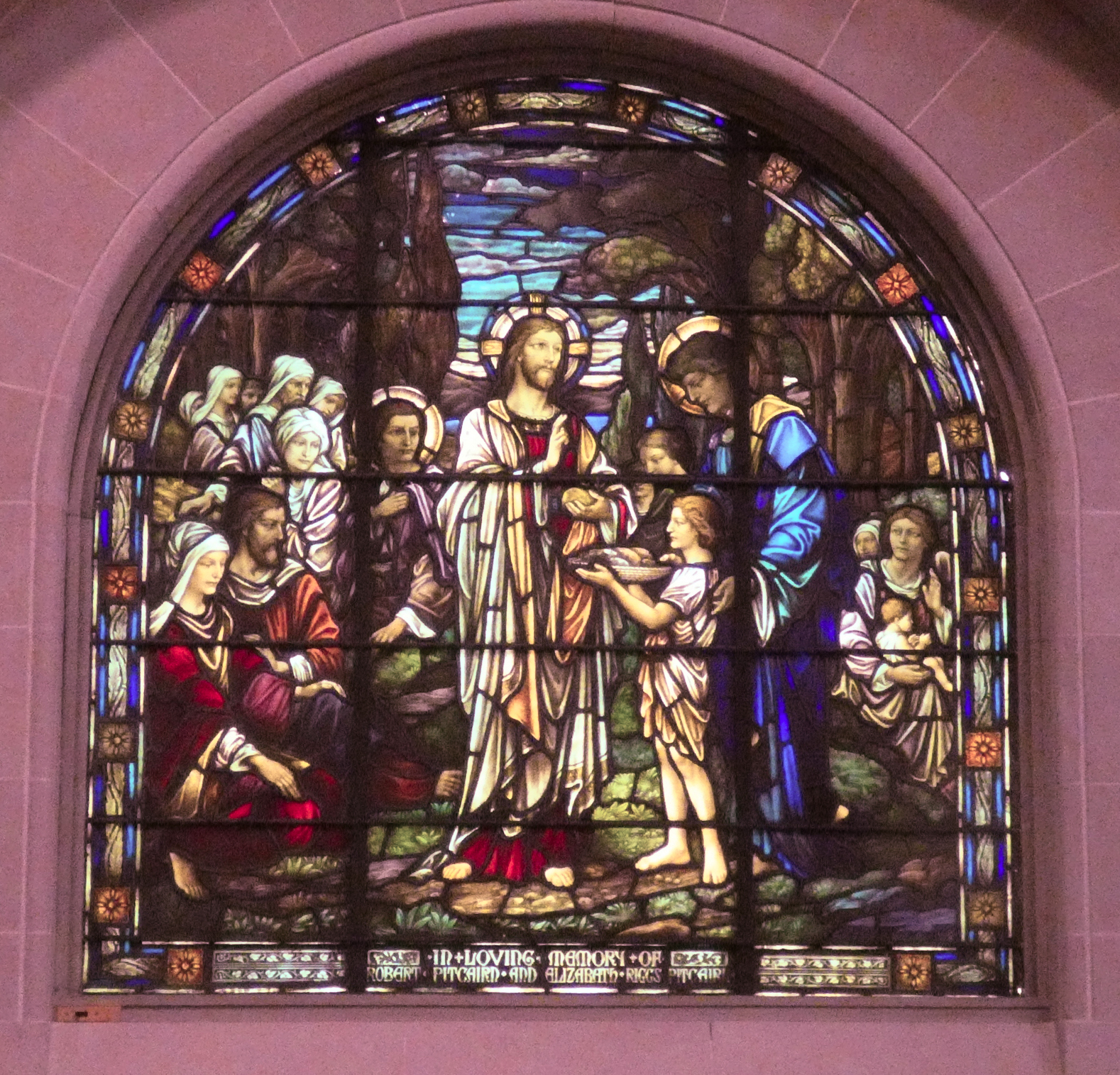
"The Feeding of the Five Thousand" stained-glass window at Shadyside Presbyterian Church—Photograph courtesy of Tim Engleman, Shadyside Presbyterian Church

In 1920, well after the deaths of both Robert and Elizabeth, new stained glass was installed in the windows of the Shadyside Presbyterian Church. Among those windows was one titled The Feeding of the Five Thousand, which was dedicated “In Loving Memory of Robert Pitcairn and Elizabeth Rigg Pitcairn.”

The Pitcairn family home, named Cairncarque, was just two blocks away from the church at the corner of Ellsworth and Amberson Avenues in the Shadyside section of Pittsburgh. Cairn is a Scottish word meaning a mound of rough stones, and carque in Scottish means conversation or gossip.

== Telegraph and Railroad ==
In 1850, 14-year-old Andrew Carnegie took a job delivering telegrams for the nascent O’Reilly Telegraph Company in Pittsburgh. The volume of telegrams grew rapidly, stimulating the need for more delivery boys. Carnegie recommended his buddy, Robert Pitcairn. Along with another Scotsman, David McCargo, the three boys delivered telegrams for the renamed Eastern Telegraph Company.

On February 1, 1853, Andrew Carnegie left the telegraph company to work for Thomas Scott at the Pennsylvania Railroad. Once Carnegie found his footing with the PRR, he saw where his friend from the telegraph office, Robert Pitcairn, could fit in and obtained an interview for him. In July 1853, 17-year-old Robert was hired and began as a telegraph operator and assistant ticket agent at Mountain House near Hollidaysburg at the east end of the Allegheny Portage Railroad. Robert and his family had first traveled past this point on their way to Allegheny City just seven years earlier.

When the PRR completed its rail line over the mountains in 1854, there was no more need for the ingenious but unreliable Allegheny Portage Railroad. So, Robert Pitcairn transferred to the Altoona office of the PRR, where he worked as a telegraph operator for General Superintendent Herman Lombaert.

The Altoona office was a university of railroading where Pitcairn learned all aspects of operating the complex organization. At the beginning of 1855, when Robert was just 18, he was promoted to chief clerk of the general superintendent’s office.

Robert remained as chief clerk until 1858, when he was transferred to Fort Wayne, Indiana, to supervise the construction of the Pittsburgh, Fort Wayne, and Chicago Railroad (PFW&CRR).

On August 1, 1860, Robert Pitcairn, age 24, left Fort Wayne to become superintendent of the PRR Middle Division. The Middle Division extended from Mifflin, 40 miles northwest of Harrisburg, to Conemaugh, east of Johnstown, and included the Horseshoe Curve and Gallitzin Tunnels.

== Civil War ==
During the Civil War, Robert and John Pitcairn were assigned to Chambersburg to manage the trains on the Cumberland Valley Railroad (CVRR), which the Union government had taken over. Robert dispatched trains during the day and John at night. Tens of thousands of Union soldiers traveled from Harrisburg to Hagerstown via the CVRR. The Pitcairn brothers remained at their critical posts for several months. After the CVRR assignment, the Pitcairns returned to their regular PRR posts, John as assistant to the superintendent of the Philadelphia Division of the PRR and Robert as superintendent of the PRR Middle Division.

== Superintendent of the Pittsburgh Division of the PRR ==
On April 1, 1865, eight days before the end of the Civil War, Andrew Carnegie resigned as superintendent of the Pittsburgh Division of the Pennsylvania Railroad. On that same day, Robert Pitcairn was named successor to his friend in that prestigious and challenging position.

The superintendent of the Pittsburgh Division was the most critical operating position in the company. Pittsburgh was the gateway for all traffic to and from the west. The area’s rivers and hilly terrain, coupled with a multitude of competing customers, including Carnegie’s steel plants, added challenges unmatched anywhere on the line.

William Bender Wilson, the noted historian who wrote History of the Pennsylvania Railroad Company, said of Robert Pitcairn,

“He was a man above the ordinary and was able to solve (the challenges) and make of the division a powerful agency in the development of the commonwealth. He started out on the principle that while the executive officer should hold a firm grasp on the reins of power he should administer the affairs of the division in the spirit of co-operation and co-ordination. One of his earliest moves was permanently instituting a meeting with his staff for conference, to be held weekly. In these meetings he listened to reports and suggestions, heard criticisms and advised, instructed and directed. This conference was practically a school of the railroad that advised the superintendent, broadened the staff and established a standard of excellence.”

A clear view of Robert Pitcairn emerges in a letter he wrote to his brother, Hugh Pitcairn, on February 1, 1866. Hugh, age 20, had just been appointed superintendent of the Susquehanna Division of the Northern Central Railroad.

Dear Hugh,

I rejoice very much at your appointment and trust in my heart that you will succeed.

“There is a tide in the affairs of men which if taken at the flood leads on to fortune and fame…” How can you take advantage of the flood? By bearing your honor meekly. Not appearing to feel your position, but still show you have confidence in your ability. Putting on no airs, but still being decided and dignified, always remembering that your youth is against you. By keeping a close mouth and not showing your ignorance. A Pitcairn can’t blow, can’t talk well and his only chance is in keeping quiet. By having no confidants unless it is your brother, John. By putting nothing on paper that you can’t say verbally unless it is a train order. Always be careful what you write, remembering that it may appear against you when least expected. Be careful, weighing all your actions, doing nothing rash, being sure to get all the facts before you decide a question. Having no temper. You will always make a fool of yourself unless you control your temper. Having no feelings, but calmly and dispassionately weighing everything and acting earnestly and for the best interest of the company without regard to yourself.... Talking very little with the employees, but still being pleasant to them.

Always examine your messages, reading them often and seeing if a misconstruction can be taken therefrom, trying every message to make it more pointed, more clear, and more safe. An accident would kill you. A mistake that the men or operators would discover would make them lose confidence in you, which would hurt you much.... Take no risks. In case of doubt take the safe course. The above is the amount of my fifteen years of railroad experience; it might be of benefit to you to read them morning, noon and night.

With much love I am your affectionate brother,

Robert

== Westinghouse Air Brake ==
Robert Pitcairn had grown up in the railroad business and he recognized a technical advancement when he saw one, so when he heard about a new way of stopping trains called an air brake, Pitcairn visited the inventor, George Westinghouse.

In April 1869, Westinghouse successfully demonstrated his air brake in Pittsburgh on a four-car train of the Panhandle Railroad. Three months after this initial success, 22-year-old George Westinghouse filed a charter under Pennsylvania law for the Westinghouse Air Brake Company. The initial capitalization was set at $500,000. In addition to Westinghouse, the board of directors included Robert Pitcairn. Pitcairn and Westinghouse became close friends and business partners.

== Expanded Responsibilities ==
PRR management recognized Robert Pitcairn’s capabilities and, on February 14, 1874, added “General Agent” to his “Superintendent” title. As general agent, he interacted with the company’s commercial interests (customers) and all transportation lines connecting with the railroad.

== Railroad Riot and Strike of 1877 ==
The Great Railroad Strike of 1877 caused six times as many deaths in Pittsburgh than the far more infamous 1892 Homestead Strike, but it is much less widely known. Robert Pitcairn was superintendent of the Pittsburgh Division of the Pennsylvania Railroad at the time of the strike and played a prominent role in every aspect.

Several unrelated factors in the 1870s combined to depress wages in the railroad industry and led to the 1877 strikes.

First, four midwestern states (Minnesota, Iowa, Wisconsin, and Illinois) passed so-called Granger Laws. Promoted by a group of farmers known as the National Grange, the Granger Laws aimed to regulate rapidly rising railroad fare prices and fees for grain elevator crop storage. Railroads and grain elevator operators opposed the state laws, and the dispute ended in the U.S. Supreme Court with the Munn v. Illinois case that was decided in March 1877. The Court upheld the Illinois law and state efforts to regulate railroad rates.

Facing declining revenues because of state regulation of rates, the major eastern railroads agreed to stop their rate wars. The heads of the railroads—John W. Garrett of the B&O, William H. Vanderbilt of the New York Central, Hugh J. Jewett of the Erie, and Tom Scott of the PRR—met to adjust shipping rates for their mutual benefit. They also discussed the need for wage reductions and how to combat ensuing strikes.

Second, the Panic of 1873 started with a stock market crash in Europe. Soon, the Panic spread to the U.S., exacerbated by massive speculative investments in railroads, property losses in the Great Chicago Fire (1871) and Great Boston Fire (1872), and the Coinage Act of 1873, which demonetized silver in the U.S.

By the end of the year, 89 of the country’s 364 railroads had failed. New railroad construction fell dramatically, from 7,500 miles of track in 1872 to just 1,600 miles in 1875. Between 1873 and 1875, 18,000 businesses declared bankruptcy. In a vicious downward spiral, lower demand for products and services led to employers reducing output and cutting wages and jobs. By 1876, the overall unemployment rate shot up to 14 percent.

Finally, another factor specifically affected employment in the railroad industry. In one of the first instances of technology adversely impacting jobs, George Westinghouse’s invention and installation of the railroad air brake meant that far fewer brakemen were required to operate trains. Instead of several brakemen per train manually applying brakes to each railroad car sequentially, the train engineer controlled the application of all brakes simultaneously from the locomotive cab.

All these factors—the Granger Laws, the lasting effects of the Panic of 1873, and air brake technology displacing workers—combined to reduce the demand for railroad workers and cut their wages.

In May 1877, the Pennsylvania Railroad cut wages of all employees by 10 percent. They made another 10 percent cut in June. On July 13, the Baltimore & Ohio Railroad cut the wages of all employees earning more than $1 a day by 10 percent. This reduction followed a similar cut in the fall of 1876. The B&O also cut the workweek to just two or three days. At about the same time, B&O announced a 10 percent dividend for its investors.

After work stoppages in Martinsburg, West Virginia and Cumberland, Maryland, a full-scale strike erupted at Robert Pitcairn’s Pennsylvania Railroad in Pittsburgh on July 21, 1877.

Police and a local militia force were ineffective, largely because their members sympathized with the strikers. So, at Pitcairn’s urging, Pennsylvania Governor John Hartranft ordered the First Division of the Pennsylvania National Guard from Philadelphia to intervene. They arrived to face a hostile crowd of 2,000 strikers and 10,000 onlookers and were pelted with projectiles of all kinds. Warning shots served only to energize the crowd, so the soldiers aimed lower, resulting in 20 fatalities.

Pitcairn, who was an eyewitness to the violence, later testified to the Pennsylvania Legislative Committee appointed to investigate the riots.

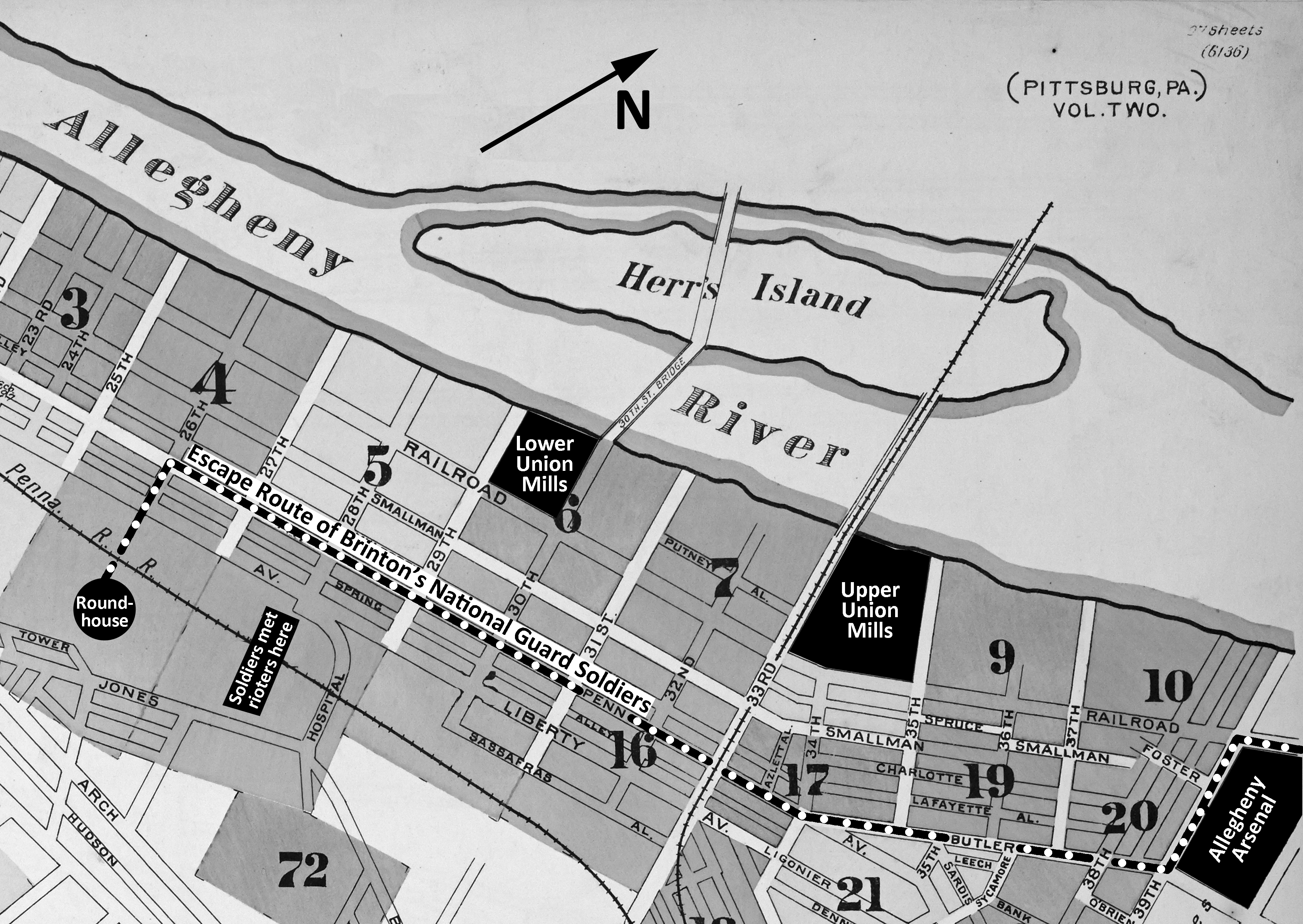
Annotated Sanborn Fire Insurance Map of Pittsburgh from 1893, showing locations of the 1877 Railroad Strike. This area of Pittsburgh is referred to as the Strip District, because it is composed of a narrow strip of buildable land between the Allegheny River and a nearby steep hillside.

Enraged by the violence, the crowd forced the soldiers to retreat to the PRR’s 26th Street roundhouse where they found temporary safety. But the strikers devised another plan, igniting freight cars carrying oil, coal, and high-proof whiskey. Then, starting at midnight, they sent the flaming cars careening down the tracks to the roundhouse below. By 5:00 AM, the soldiers were forced to vacate the roundhouse and make a run for safety across the nearby Allegheny River.

Harper’s Weekly reported on the riots in the August 11, 1877 issue: “The news of the slaughter of the mob spread through the city like wild-fire, and produced the most intense excitement. The streets were rapidly crowded, and the wildest rumors prevailed. When the news reached the large number of rolling-mill hands and workmen in the various shops of the city, they were excited to frenzy, and by eight o’clock the streets of the central portion of the city were alive with them. A large crowd broke into the manufactory of the Great Western Gun-Works, and captured 200 rifles and a quantity of small-arms, and various other crowds sacked all the other places in the city where arms were exposed for sale, getting about 300 more.”

Railroad strikes spread across the country, eventually impacting 100,000 workers and stopping traffic on half of the nation’s 75,000 miles of track.

Back in Pittsburgh, which had seen the most destruction in the country, city leaders and businessmen totaled up the damage. The human cost was enormous. An estimated 53 rioters were killed, 109 injured, and 139 arrested. Eight soldiers lost their lives, and another 15 were wounded.

About 1,600 freight cars, 55 passenger cars, and 104 locomotives were destroyed, along with machine shops and railroad offices. In addition, almost two square miles of the city were devastated by fire. Various sources estimated the total damage to be between $4 and $10 million.

== Town of Pitcairn, Pennsylvania ==
Twelve years later, the economy had recovered, and Robert Pitcairn saw the need to build a rail yard in a less crowded area outside of the congestion in Pittsburgh. In January 1889, he announced the construction of a new rail yard on 215 acres of land in the Turtle Creek Valley near Wall Station, Pennsylvania, 12 miles east of Pittsburgh. Building the facility required changing the course of Turtle Creek, separating the passenger and freight mainlines by moving the passenger tracks to the north, and situating the yard on reclaimed bottom land.

In addition to the switching yards, there were two engine roundhouses, machine shops, a lumber yard, power plant, and cabinet, upholstery, and paint shops so the facility could build, service, and repair all types of rolling stock.

Building lots were laid out to accommodate homes for railroad workers. By 1890, the village grew and became known as Walurba, denoting a suburb of Wall. The rail yard also grew, eventually becoming the most extensive rail yard in the world, at one time employing nearly 10,000 people. The Wall Yard, with 20 miles of track, opened on April 22, 1892.

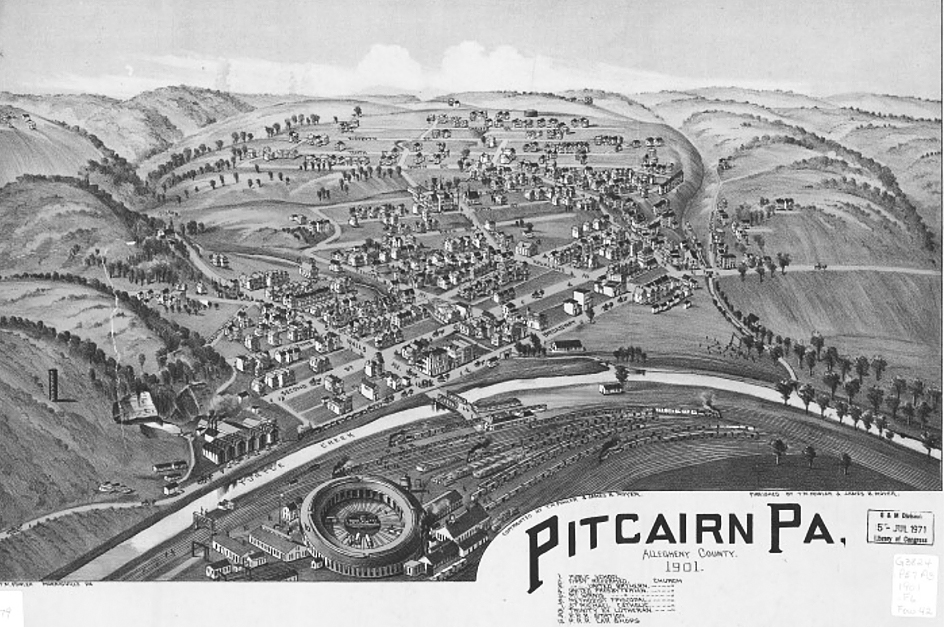
Pitcairn, PA 1901--Turtle Creek separates Pitcairn Borough from the railroad yards

In 1894, the residents decided to form their own community. The village was incorporated as a borough and adopted Pitcairn as its name. On December 6, 1897, at the request of the Borough Council, the PRR changed the name of its depot from Walurba to Pitcairn.

== Johnstown Flood ==
In the second half of the nineteenth century, industry in Pittsburgh boomed, creating enormous wealth and associated environmental pollution. When promoter Benjamin Franklin Ruff offered pristine lakefront property high in the mountains 70 miles east of the city, he found willing customers among the rich Pittsburghers anxious to escape the smoke and soot, if only for a week in the summer.

Ruff based his sanctuary on the South Fork Dam, built to supply water to the west end of the Pennsylvania Main Line Canal and abandoned when the Pennsylvania Railroad eliminated the need for the canal. Among those who paid the $100 membership fee to join Ruff’s South Fork Fishing and Hunting Club were Andrew and Thomas Carnegie, Henry Clay Frick, and Robert Pitcairn.

Opening for guests in July 1881, the club offered relaxed elegance in a 47-bedroom clubhouse with a 150-seat dining room, property for privately owned “cottages”, boating and fishing on 400-acre Lake Conemaugh, and freedom from the cares and dirt of the city. But the lake lacked any means to drain excess water, as Ruff had removed the crucial drainage pipes and lowered the center of the dam to within a few feet of the spillway. Disaster was inevitable but ignored.

That disaster came at the end of May 1889, when torrential rains, estimated at six to ten inches in a 24-hour period, fell over the Johnstown area and Lake Conemaugh. With no way to systematically drain excess water from the lake, and with debris blocking the spillway, workers labored furiously to add trees, rocks and dirt to raise the lowered center of the dam.

About Noon on May 31, the telegraph agent at South Fork, just below the dam, received an excited visitor. The agent, Emma Ehrenfeld, could hardly believe his story. He said a man came from the lake and told him, “It’s rising very fast and there’s danger of the reservoir breaking.” Because the rains had disrupted the telegraph line between South Fork and Johnstown, the warning of imminent catastrophe had to be hand-carried around the break before it could be transmitted to the telegraph agent in Johnstown and forwarded to Pittsburgh. The actual telegram is lost to posterity, but the message said something like, “SOUTH FORK DAM LIABLE TO BREAK: NOTIFY THE PEOPLE OF JOHNSTOWN TO PREPARE FOR THE WORST.” It arrived at the desk of Robert Pitcairn about 1:00 PM, and he immediately boarded his private railroad car and departed for Johnstown.

Two more increasingly urgent telegrams arrived in Johnstown at about 2:00 PM and 2:44 PM. Residents, having heard “The sky is falling” warnings many times previously, moved to upper stories of their homes and some evacuated to the nearby hills surrounding the city. But nothing humans did either at the dam site or in Johnstown could prevent the coming devastation.

At about 2:55 PM, the center of the dam disintegrated, releasing a 60-foot wall of water that thundered down the narrow valley. At 4:07 PM, after decimating the eastern suburbs of East Conemaugh and Woodvale, the torrent hit Johnstown.

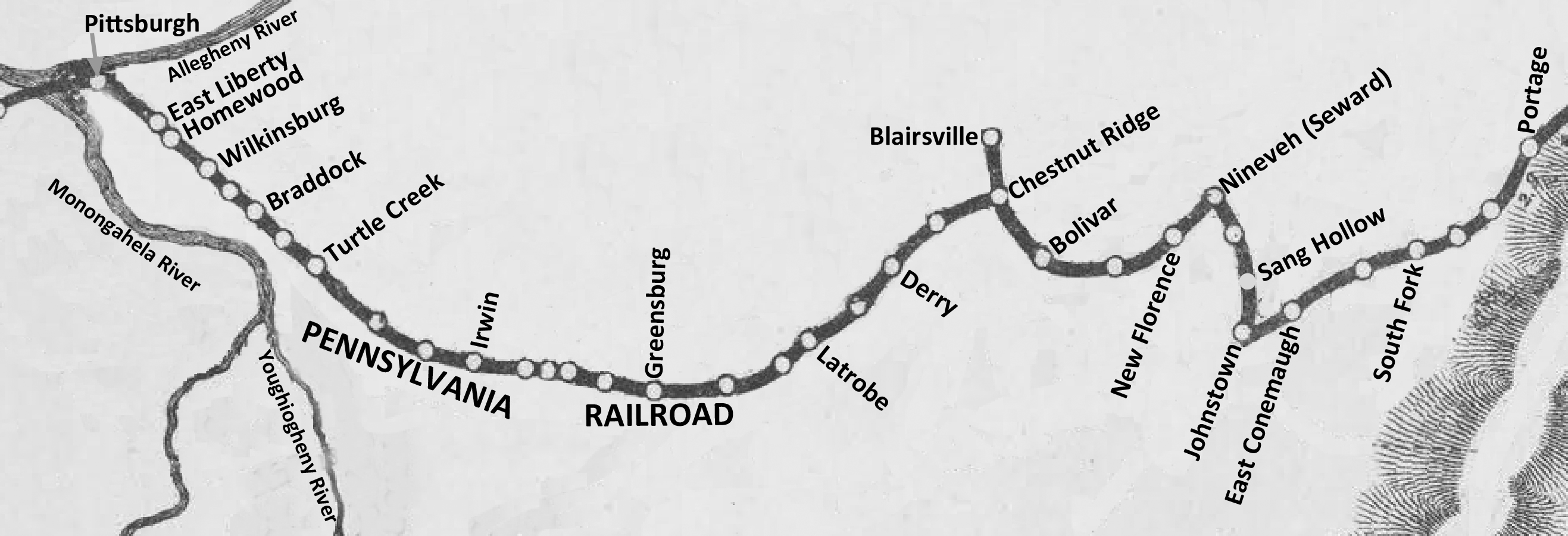
PRR Mainline from Pittsburgh to Portage. Robert Pitcairn followed this route in response to warnings that the South Fork Dam was in jeopardy of failing. His journey ended at Sang Hollow because the tracks were impassable beyond that point.

Meanwhile, the train carrying Robert Pitcairn proceeded east along the Monongahela River valley, with each railroad station revealing more severe flooding from the recent rains. When the train entered the Conemaugh Gap, a 1,500-foot-deep gorge carved by the Conemaugh River on its path from Johnstown, progress stopped at a tower named Sang Hollow, about four miles west of Johnstown. The time was 4:05 p.m., two minutes before the wall of water arrived at Johnstown.

Pitcairn climbed the Sang Hollow tower to determine the reason for the stoppage. The operator said the telegraph lines to Johnstown were down, and he could not allow them to proceed without clearance. Pitcairn was about to overrule him and proceed when debris in the river caught his eye. Initially, he saw pieces of broken wood, but that was soon followed by a man riding the trash pile. Then there were more people, some clinging to telegraph poles, some to damaged buildings, some trying to swim. Pitcairn and the other men on the train tried to help. By dark, they had counted 119 people rushing by, dead and alive. They had managed to rescue seven.

A flood survivor, W.N. Hayes, walked the four miles from Johnstown to Sang Hollow and reported that Johnstown was “literally wiped out” and that the debris at the stone arch bridge was 40 feet high and burning. Accordingly, Pitcairn sent an order to “collect all the men from the western lines, and material to repair the damage.”

Pitcairn also sent a detailed report to the Pittsburgh Commercial Gazette, calling for immediate help for the survivors:

In going to the trouble, with water west of Lilly’s, I could get no further than Sang Hollow. Our tracks west of this point are also obstructed. While at Sang Hollow, over 100 men, women and children passed there on debris; seven were recovered at Sang Hollow, two at Conemaugh Furnace and two here.... From my supervisor who was at Johnstown, I learn that Johnstown is literally wiped out. Our track between Johnstown and Conemaugh is filled with buildings and drift forty feet high or more, which is on fire. All our tracks as I have said are badly blocked between Sang Hollow and Johnstown. I fear there will be terrible suffering among those saved, which should be relieved as soon as possible. In the interest of humanity, I think a public meeting should be called early tomorrow to send food, clothing, etc., to those poor people, which we will be glad to forward to Johnstown and neighborhood as soon as we can get a clear track there. Robert Pitcairn

On the next day, Saturday, June 1, a mass meeting was held at Pittsburgh’s Old City Hall. Robert Pitcairn reported what he had seen and then urged the crowd to help, saying, “Gentlemen, it is not tomorrow you want to act, but today; thousands of lives were lost in a moment, and the living need immediate help.” The response was overwhelming:

Then there was a call for contributions, and the storm of checks and bank notes began. Fives, tens, fifties and thousands flooded the chairman’s table. Treasurer Thompson’s hands were filled and Mayor McCallin held out both of his. In a minute more, H.I. Gourley was called to his assistance. The three men stood there for half an hour and the crowd kept both hands busy. It was almost impossible to keep track of the contributions. “Whose $25 is this?” cried Mr. Thompson. And a moment later—“Somebody laid this one hundred-dollar bill down here—who was it?” Business men and their employees, distillers and doctors of divinity, saloon keepers and prohibitionists, vied with each other. Differences of creed and condition disappeared in the generous rivalry of charity. There was no speech making, no oratory but the golden eloquence of cash. Big and little contributions got applause, so long as they were in proportion to the means of the giver. For almost an hour, at the rate of a thousand dollars a minute, the storm of money poured down upon the table, until $48,116.70 had been received.

People and organizations from every state in the U.S. provided over $3.6 million for the relief effort. Contributions from 12 foreign countries added another $141,301. In addition to the money, people and organizations sent goods—food, clothes, furniture, and tools. The Pennsylvania Flood Relief Commission estimated that 1,408 railroad carloads of goods, weighing 17 million pounds, had been sent to Johnstown.

The first of those goods came from Pittsburgh, where wagons went through the city collecting food and clothing, which were then loaded aboard train cars. PRR crews had been at work rebuilding the track from Sang Hollow to the now-infamous stone arch bridge. The first train out from Pittsburgh had 20 full cars along with 75 volunteers of the “Pittsburgh Relief Committee,” 12 reporters, and 18 police. The relief train left Pittsburgh at 4:30 p.m. on Saturday, June 1. Stalled freight trains along the line and a 400-foot washout east of Sang Hollow delayed the train. It crept through the ruins of Coopersdale, Morrellville, and Cambria City and arrived at the stone arch bridge in Johnstown on the morning of Sunday, June 2.

Damage to Robert Pitcairn’s Pennsylvania Railroad facilities was beyond belief. Thirty-three engines that had been at home in the roundhouse were strewn in a haphazard line stretching for a mile. Eighteen passenger cars and 315 freight cars floated by the flood stood dumbly in the streets with no rails in sight. Parts of railroad cars would be excavated as late as 1900.

Robert Pitcairn put his PRR crews to work as soon as the floodwaters receded. Washouts had occurred along the banks of the Little Conemaugh and Conemaugh Rivers from South Fork in the east to Sang Hollow west of Johnstown. Three miles of track and their supporting embankments were gone. Bridge #6 and the massive viaduct had to be replaced by wooden trestles. In five days, the PRR crews reopened the line from Pittsburgh to Johnstown, and by June 14, the workers had accomplished what looked impossible and restored rail service from Pittsburgh, through Johnstown, to Altoona.

== Fateful Trip ==
George Westinghouse and Robert Pitcairn both lived within walking distance of the Pennsylvania Railroad mainline on the east side of Pittsburgh. At 6:30 p.m. on June 24, 1892, they left New York City together, bound for home aboard Westinghouse’s private railcar, Glen Eyre. The ten-hour trip was usually uneventful but turned tragic soon after midnight.

In heavy rain, the two sections of the Western Express No. 9 approached Harrisburg, Pennsylvania at about 12:30 a.m. The first section, composed of a baggage car, an express car, three day coaches, and Glen Eyre in the rear, stopped for a few minutes to permit some shifting in the train yards.

As the first section of the train started forward, the second section, with two baggage cars and five Pullman sleeper cars, failed to stop as it should have and plowed into Glen Eyre at 40 miles per hour, telescoping it into the rest of the train. Pitcairn and Westinghouse escaped with only minor injuries, but 12 passengers in the day coaches were killed and 23 injured. The accident destroyed Glen Eyre. The coroner’s jury determined that negligence by the 22-year-old novice operator working the Steelton tower caused the accident. Failures by the flagman on the first section and the engineer of the second section also contributed to the disaster.

== Retirement and Life After the PRR ==
While serving as superintendent of the Pennsylvania Railroad, Pitcairn was instrumental in implementing a policy that every worker who had been with the company at least 25 years should be pensioned upon reaching the age of 70. Ironically, Pitcairn was to become the first recipient of this policy. When he reached 70, President A.J. Cassatt required that Pitcairn, then serving as Resident Assistant to the President, retire on May 31, 1906.

Andrew Carnegie wrote to Pitcairn on the occasion of his retirement:

Two East Ninety-first Street, New York

Sunday Morning, May 13, 1906

My dear Bob,

So sorry that I sail before the evening of retirement arrives.

Well, my fellow “seventy year old,” those who lay down the armor, not who put it on, are the people who can boast. They have fought the fight and won.

You have done this and now comes the final triumph of all—a dignified, calm, old age, for at seventy we enter upon a new stage.

All that of active business must be dismissed.

To become an old man gracefully is our only true aim. You do not need to grab for more dollars—they would add nothing worth while. The benefit of your experience on committees for public good will be valuable. All you do should have reference to others, individuals, or the community as a whole.

“We have climbed the hill the gither.”

I welcome you to begin the last ascent and then, no more. We shall have lived our lives on earth, let us allure ourselves as with enchantments hoping there’s another where old age comes not.

With every good wish, my dear, dear friend of boyhood.

Always yours,

Andy

Robert Pitcairn had interests outside of the Pennsylvania Railroad. He was a director of 11 corporations, a presidential elector for three presidents, a member of city commissions, a Past Master of Hailman Lodge of Free and Accepted Masons, and Past Grand Commander of the Knights Templar of Pennsylvania. He was a Director of Western Theological Seminary and Vice Moderator of the (Presbyterian) Assembly in 1901.” In addition, Pitcairn was vice president of Westinghouse Air Brake and Union Switch & Signal Companies. He was also a director and second vice president of Fidelity Title & Trust Company.

But, as Andy Carnegie wrote after Pitcairn’s death:

No man was more devoted to his duties on the Pennsylvania Railroad than Robert Pitcairn. His whole life was given to it. I was one who tried hard to have an exception made in his case regarding the rule that compelled retirement at a certain age. I felt sure that he would never be happy after retirement. He came to visit us at Skibo, and I found such was the case; nothing appeared to interest him; his life’s work was done. Fortunately he was made a trustee of the Hero Fund and I believe that his work there prolonged his life.

== Death ==
On June 20, 1907, just over a year after his forced retirement from the PRR, Robert Pitcairn suffered a severe accident. He was preparing to board a streetcar to return home from the Carnegie Institute when a bicyclist collided with Pitcairn, knocking him down and landing with his cycle on top of him. Robert managed to board the next streetcar to return home but was in great pain when he arrived. By morning, Pitcairn’s right arm and shoulder were so swollen that further diagnosis was hindered. Robert recovered from his injuries, but his family continued to worry about his physical and emotional health.

Robert Pitcairn died at age 73 at his Pittsburgh home, Cairncarque, on July 25, 1909, three years after his retirement. His funeral service, led by the Rev. Doctor J. Kinsey Smith of Shadyside Presbyterian Church, was held at the family home. Pallbearers included George Westinghouse and Richard B. Mellon.

After her husband’s death, Elizabeth Pitcairn became quite active in suffragette causes around Pittsburgh and hosted related events at Cairncarque. With a dozen other women who owned automobiles, she drove around Pittsburgh with placards supporting women’s right to vote. In June 1915, more than 3,000 people gathered on the lawn at Cairncarque to party and dance for women’s suffrage.

Elizabeth died at her son’s Pasadena, California, home on April 13, 1917. Robert and Elizabeth are interred in a mausoleum at Pittsburgh’s Homewood Cemetery near their Shadyside home.
