= Robert Pitcairn (antiquary) =

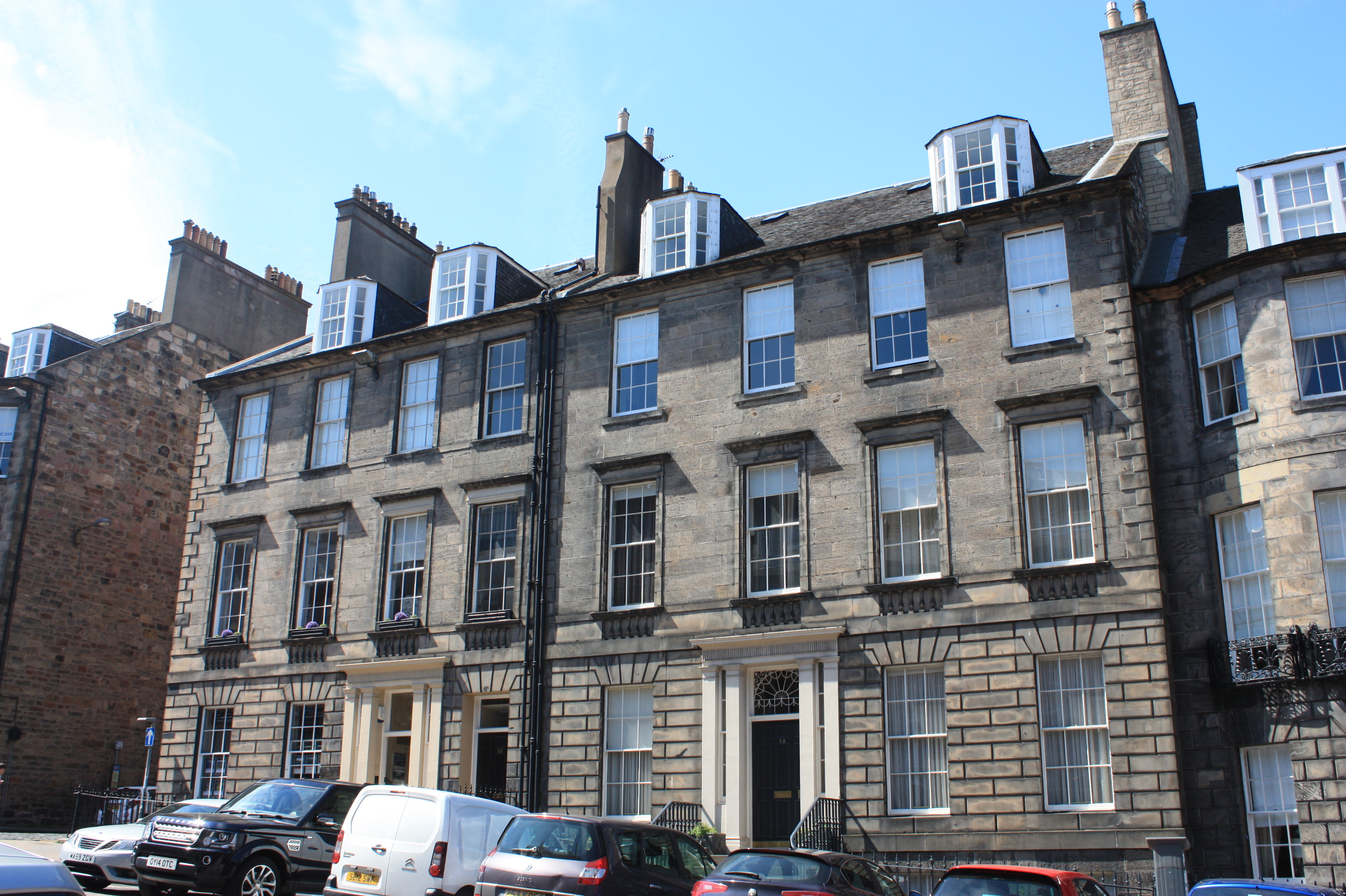
Robert Pitcairn lived in an attractive flat at 50 North Castle Street, Edinburgh

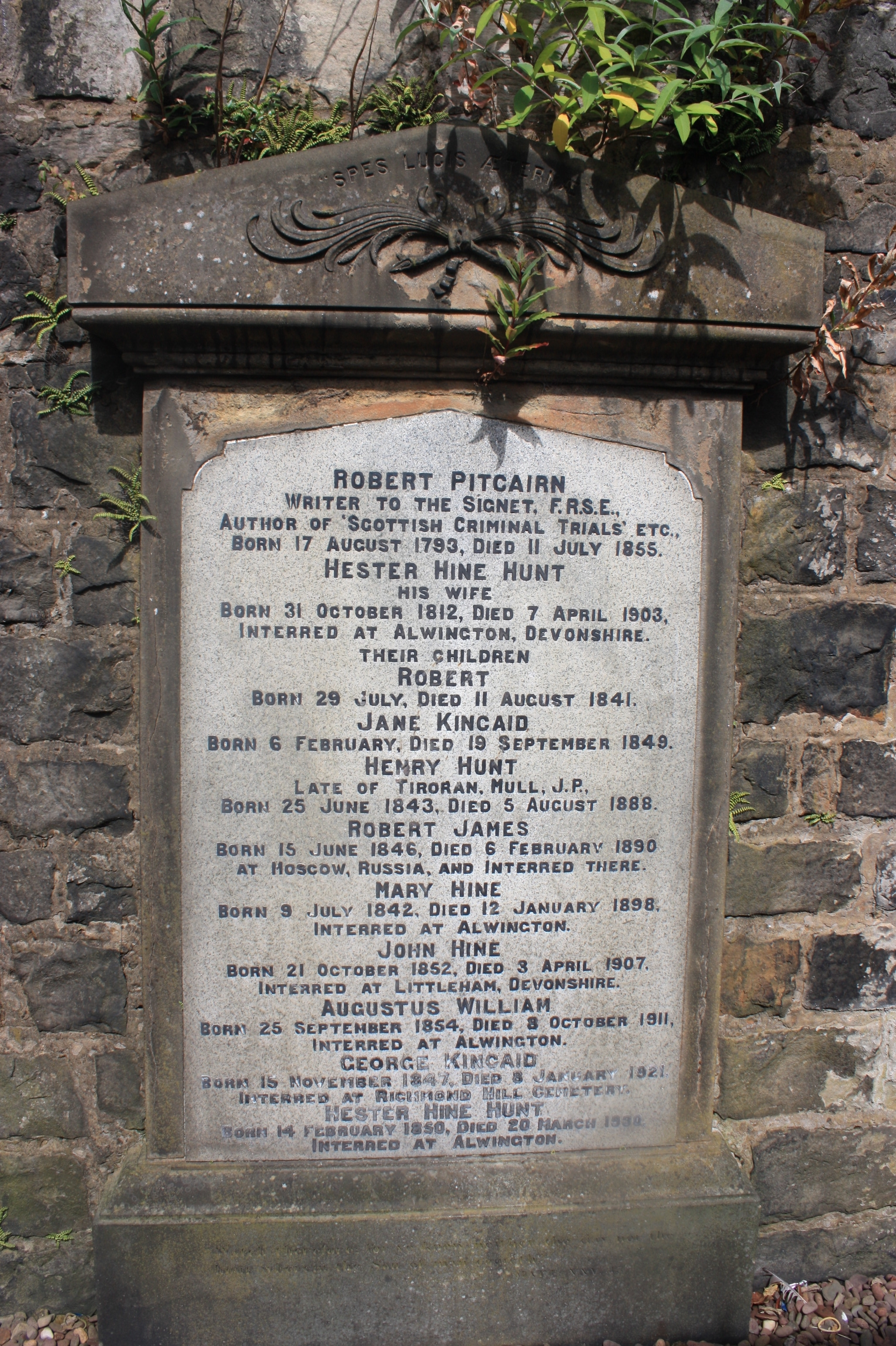
Robert Pitcairn's grave, New Calton Cemetery

Robert Pitcairn FSA Scot FRSE (14 August 1793 – 11 July 1855) was a Scottish antiquary and scholar who contributed to works published by Walter Scott and the Bannatyne Club. He was the author of Criminal Trials and other Proceedings before the High Court of Justiciary in Scotland (1829-1833). He was head of the Edinburgh Printing and Publishing Company and secretary of the Calvin Translating Society Pitcairn was a fellow of the Society of Antiquaries of Scotland, and a Writer to His Majesty’s Signet, and a member of the Maitland Club.

== Life ==
He was born in Edinburgh in 1793, second son of Jean Kincaid and Robert Pitcairn (1749-1828), Principal Keeper at Register House. He was first cousin to William Fettes Pitcairn.

He trained as a lawyer and was admitted to the Society of Writers to HM Signet on 21 November 1815. He was a friend and collaborator of Sir Walter Scott, often obtaining historical information for his use. He lived more or less opposite Scott, at 50 Castle Street in Edinburgh's New Town (now known as North Castle Street).

He married Hester Hine Hunt, daughter of Henry Hunt, on 4 September 1839.

He died of heart disease in Edinburgh in 1855. He is buried in New Calton Cemetery with his wife and children in a vault adjacent to the Stevenson vault.

== Publications ==
- Ancient Criminal Trials in Scotland (1833)
- Collections Relative to the Funeral of Mary Queen of Scots (1822)
- Historical and Genealogical Account of the Principal Families of the surname of Kennedy (1830)
