= Altoona Tribune =

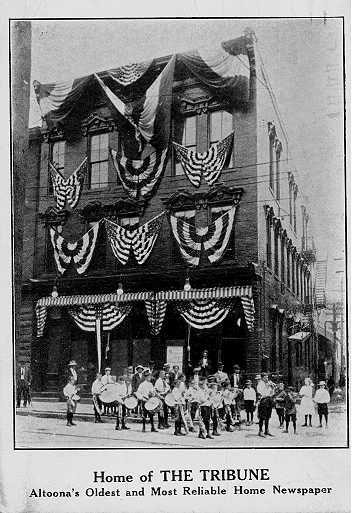
Offices of the Altoona Tribune at 11th St. and 12th Ave., Altoona, c. 1914

The Altoona Tribune was a daily newspaper in Blair County, Pennsylvania. It was in operation from 1856 to 1957.

== History ==
It was launched on January 1, 1856, by Ephraim B. McCrum and William M. Allison, with equipment purchased from the defunct Altoona Register. Two years later, H. C. Dern acquired Allison's share of the company, and in 1875, Hugh Pitcairn replaced McCrum. Dern and Pitcairn started publishing daily issues in 1873. These were discontinued after two years, but resumed in 1878.

The Tribune occupied its own three-story building at 1110 12th Street, with the press room in the basement, circulation and advertising on the first floor, the editorial department on the second floor and the composing room on the third floor.

Adam J. Greer was one of the first editors, and was followed by William H. Schwartz. Schwartz had been associated with local newspaper work for more than thirty years, and achieved widespread recognition for his editorials.

Mr. Dern died in 1905, but his family retained his interest in the paper. Hugh Pitcairn became the president, and the Tribune remained in control of Pitcairn and the Dern family until 1912, when Col. Henry W. Shoemaker assumed ownership and merged it with two other papers, the Altoona Gazette and the Altoona Times.

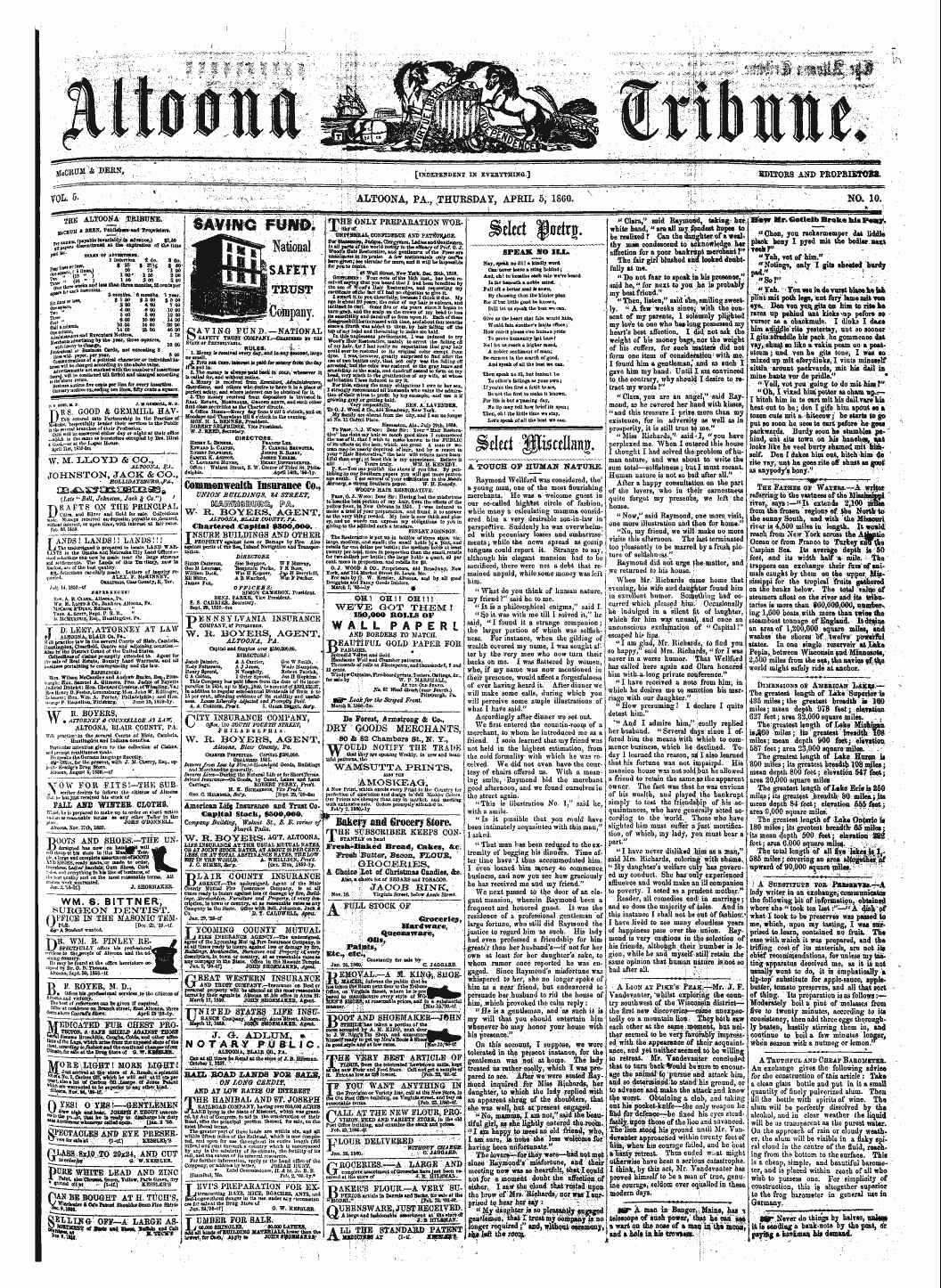
Front page of the Altoona Tribune, April 5, 1860

Under the Pitcairn-Dern ownership, the Tribune maintained a wide circulation (42,000 in 1899), and appeared each morning. Its political stance was "independent Republican", and it described itself as "progressive".

The new owner, Shoemaker, wrote a weekly column in which he covered regional folklore and history and called for conservation and neighborhood beautification efforts.

The Tribune ended publication with the issue of December 31, 1957, citing rising labor and material costs.

The Tribune was inducted into the Blair County Chamber of Commerce Business Hall of Fame on October 15, 2012.

There was also a newspaper called The Altoona Tribune, which served Altoona, Wisconsin, and which closed in 1947.
