= William Pitcairn =

Scottish physician and botanist (1712–1791)

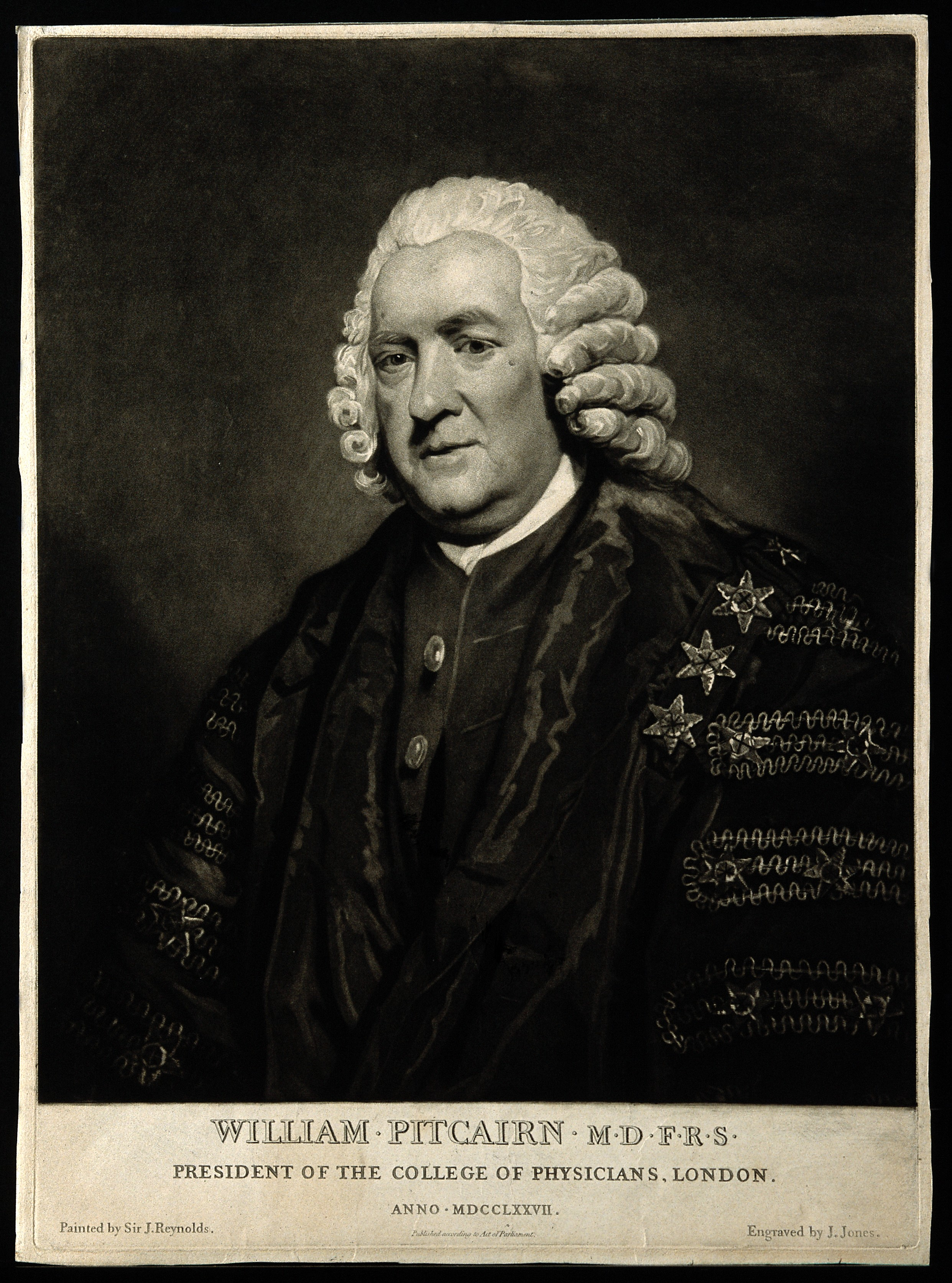

William Pitcairn (9 May 1712 – 25 November 1791) was a Scottish physician and botanist.

He was born in Dysart, Fife, the second son of the Revd David Pitcairn. A younger brother was John Pitcairn, who became a British Marine officer and was killed at the Battle of Bunker Hill; John's son and William's nephew was midshipman Robert Pitcairn, for whom Pitcairn Island is named.

William Pitcairn studied first at the University of Leiden and then at the University of Rheims, where he was awarded his MD. He then sent to England and obtained a second degree in medicine from Oxford University in 1749.

He moved to London and became physician to St Bartholomew's Hospital. He became a Fellow of the Royal College of Physicians and gave their Goulstonian lectures in 1752. He became their President from 1775 to 1784.

He was elected a Fellow of the Royal Society in 1770 as someone "distinguished by his application to Botany and success in rearing scarce and foreign plants". The bromeliad genus Pitcairnia is named for him.

He died in Islington, London on 25 November 1791 and was buried in a vault in the church of St Bartholomew the Less, London within the hospital walls.
