= John Pitcairn =

British military officer (1722–1775)

Major John Pitcairn
- Born: 28 December 1722; Dysart, Fife
- Died: 17 June 1775 (aged 52); Boston, Massachusetts
- Burial place: Old North Church, Boston
- Spouse: Elizabeth Dalrymple (m. 1745)
- Children: 9
- Military career
- Allegiance: Great Britain
- Branch: British Army; His Majesty's Marine Forces
- Service years: 1745–1775
- Rank: Major
- Units: Henry Cornewall's Regiment of Marines; Chatham Division
- Conflicts: War of the Austrian Succession; French and Indian War; American War of Independence; Boston campaign; Battles of Lexington and Concord; Siege of Boston; Battle of Bunker Hill (DOW)

Major John Pitcairn (28 December 1722 – 17 June 1775) was a British military officer. Born in Dysart, Fife, he enlisted in a marine regiment of the British Army in 1745 during the War of the Austrian Succession and joined His Majesty's Marine Forces when it was raised in 1755. Pitcairn served in North America during the French and Indian War before being sent to Boston in 1774 at the rank of major. He fought in the 1775 Battles of Lexington and Concord which sparked the American War of Independence. Two months later in June, Pitcairn was killed in action during the Battle of Bunker Hill. Respected by both his men and his American opponents, he was buried at Boston's Old North Church. At the time of his death Pitcairn was serving alongside his son Thomas, also a marine officer in the same division, who helped to carry his mortally wounded father from the battlefield.

== Early life and military service ==
Pitcairn was born in 1722 in Dysart, a port town in Fife, Scotland. His parents were the clergyman David Pitcairn and his wife Katherine. One of Pitcairn's older brothers William later became a famed botanist and served as president of the Royal College of Physicians. During the War of the Austrian Succession Pitcairn decided to join the British Army and was commissioned into Henry Cornewall's Regiment of Marines at the rank of ensign in 1745.

Promoted to lieutenant in 1746, his regiment was disbanded on 3 November 1748, temporarily putting an end to Pitcairn's active service. However, he joined His Majesty's Marine Forces when it was created in April 1755 and as a member of the Chatham Division served in North America during the French and Indian War at the rank of captain. In 1771 Pitcairn was promoted to major and three years later was sent to Boston, Massachusetts in command of 600 marines assigned to support the royal governor, General Thomas Gage, in the increasingly resistive colony.

== American Revolution and death ==
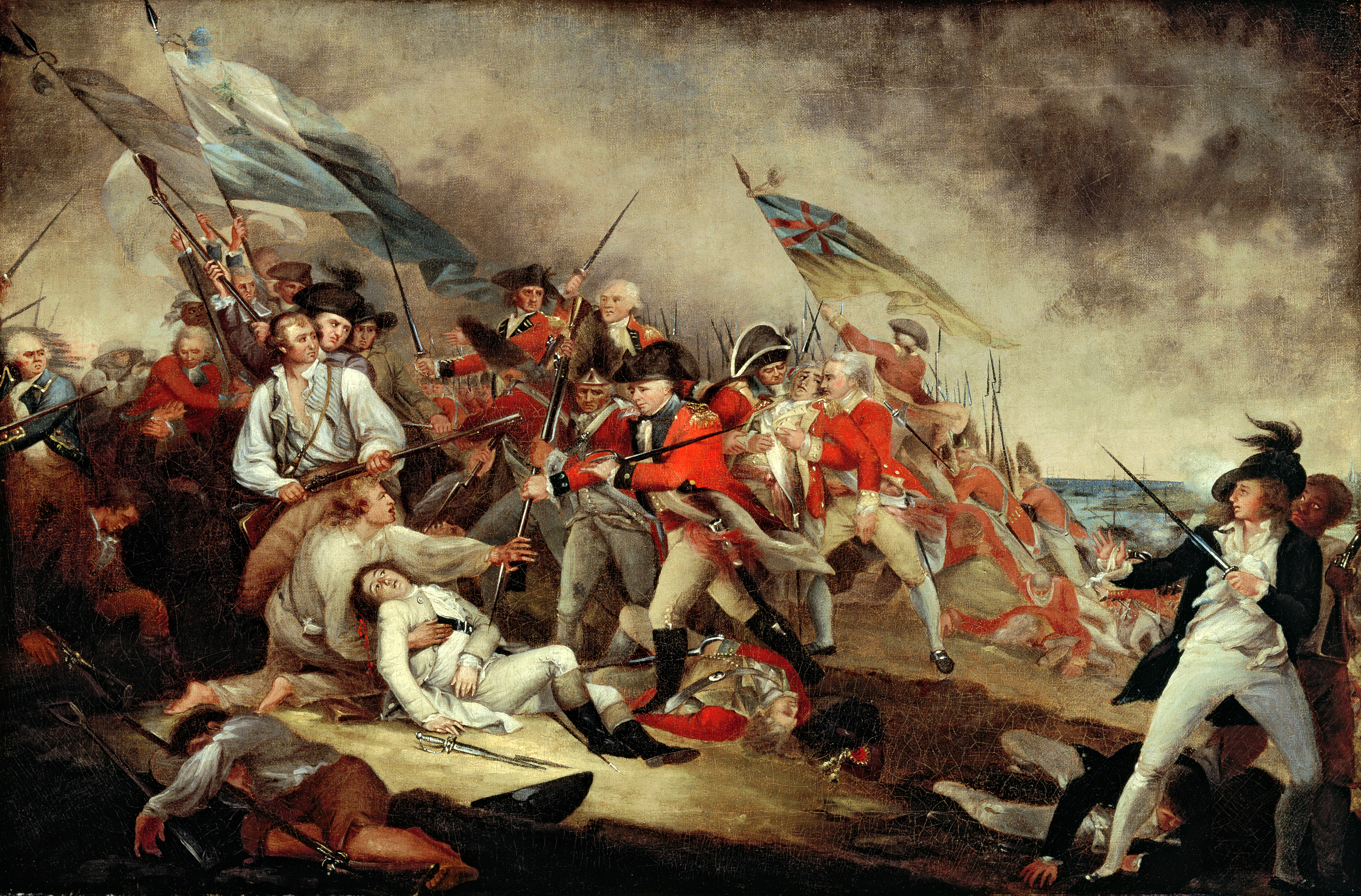
John Trumbull's The Death of General Warren at the Battle of Bunker Hill. At right center, Pitcairn falls into the arms of his son

Pitcairn was respected by the citizens in Boston as one of the most reasonable officers in the British occupational force. He was in command of the advance party that marched on Lexington and Concord on 19 April 1775, which began the American War of Independence. His horse was shot from under him, and Pitcairn lost a pair of pistols he owned when the column's baggage train was abandoned and fell into rebel hands. The American Major General Israel Putnam would carry them through the rest of the war.

At the Battle of Bunker Hill two months later, Pitcairn commanded a reserve force of about 300 marines. They landed at the south end of the Charlestown peninsula. When the first assaults failed, Pitcairn led his men up the hill toward the American position. Although already being wounded by two gunshots, he led his men through the rebel trenches. When he entered the trenches, he was shot four times. He toppled into the arms of his son, Thomas, also a Marine officer, who cried out, "I have lost my father!" Some marines tried to console the son, while others, overcome with emotion, openly wept. Pitcairn was carried back to Boston, where he died of his wound, at a home on Prince Street, within hours. He is buried at the Old North Church in Boston. After the battle, several marines said they "had all lost a father".

John Trumbull's painting of the Battle of Bunker Hill depicts Pitcairn's death, though with several errors and anachronisms. Since no portrait of him is known to exist, Pitcairn's son David was used as a model by Trumbull. The uniform Pitcairn is dressed in was not actually adopted by British marines until the 1780s. Pitcairn is shown falling at the crest during its capture from the American force, while he was actually shot starting to climb the hill. Major Pitcairn is also depicted in Trumbull's painting of the Battle of Lexington in the U.S. Capitol rotunda.

== Family ==
John Pitcairn married Elizabeth Dalrymple. Together they had five sons and four daughters. One son, Robert, was a midshipman in the Royal Navy, who on 3 July 1767 was aboard the sloop HMS Swallow. He was the first person to sight an unknown island in the south Pacific, and the captain named the island Pitcairn's Island in the boy's honour. Later, in 1770, Robert Pitcairn was aboard an East India Company ship that vanished without trace en route to the Comoro Islands. Another daughter, Catherine Pitcairn, married Charles Cochrane, son of the 8th Earl of Dundonald and a first cousin of Admiral Thomas Cochrane, 10th Earl of Dundonald.

== In popular culture ==
- Pitcairn appears in April Morning, a 1961 novel by Howard Fast depicting the Battles of Lexington and Concord. Pitcairn is also a character in the novel Johnny Tremain.
- Pitcairn is a supporting antagonist in the video game Assassin's Creed III. As a young Marine officer, Pitcairn is recruited by Grand Master Haytham Kenway to support the Templars' aims of controlling a fledgling America's future in the name of the Templar Order. In the game, he can either be assassinated on his horse from high in the trees during the Battle of Bunker Hill or fought as a boss, by the protagonist Kanienʼkehá꞉ka Assassin Ratonhnhaké:ton.
- Pitcairn is a supporting character in the History Channel's three-part miniseries Sons of Liberty which aired in 2015. He is portrayed by Irish actor Kevin Ryan.
