= Bryn Athyn Historic District =

Historic district in Pennsylvania, United States

- U.S. National Register of Historic Places
- U.S. National Historic Landmark District
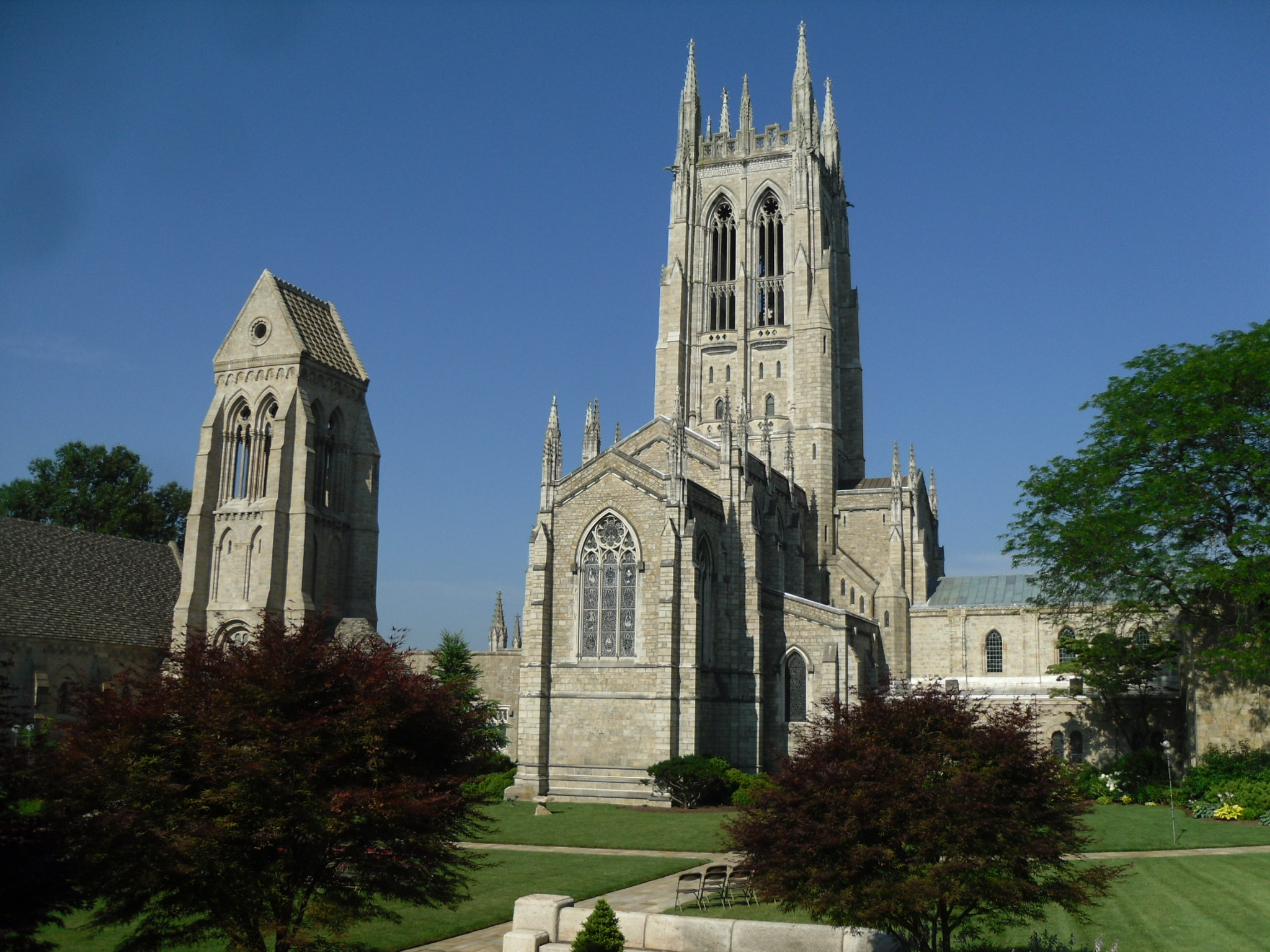
- Bryn Athyn Cathedral

- Location within Pennsylvania Location within the United States
- Location: Huntington Pike and Cathedral Road, Bryn Athyn, Pennsylvania
- Coordinates: 40°8′4″N 75°3′48″W
- Area: 37.7 acres (15.3 ha)
- Architect: Carrere and Hastings, Cram, Trout; Price, Pitcairn
- Architectural style: Late Gothic Revival, Beaux Arts
- NRHP reference No.: 08001087

Significant dates
- Added to NRHP: October 6, 2008
- Designated NHLD: October 6, 2008

The Bryn Athyn Historic District is a National Historic Landmark District encompassing an important collection of Arts and Crafts movement architecture in Bryn Athyn, Montgomery County, Pennsylvania. Designated in 2008, it includes three residential properties associated with the Pitcairn family who supported the movement, as well as Bryn Athyn Cathedral, all built by craftsmen employed by the Pitcairns.

The district properties are located in the center of Bryn Athyn, on the west side of Huntington Pike (Pennsylvania Route 232), and is roughly bisected by Cathedral Road. On its north side stand Cairnwood and the Glencairn Museum, both built as homes of the Pitcairns, and on its south are the Bryn Athyn Cathedral, the mother church of the General Church of the New Jerusalem, and Cairncrest, another Pitcairn home that now houses church offices.

== History ==
John Pitcairn Jr. (1841–1916) was a Scottish-born businessman who built a large fortune through the Pittsburgh Plate Glass Company (now PPG Industries), the first major manufacturer of plate glass. Pitcairn was of the Swedenborgian faith and in the late 1880s sought to establish a major educational and religious center for The New Church. To that end he purchased 500 acres (200 ha) in then-rural Montgomery County, Pennsylvania, north of Philadelphia. He retained the renowned New York City firm of Carrère and Hastings to design his estate, called Cairnwood. Completed in 1895, it is a major residential work in the Beaux Arts style, some of whose principles would inform later work of the Pitcairns. Pitcairn also retained Charles Eliot to landscape and plan the acreage for the family and the adjacent religious institutions.

Beginning in 1897, Pitcairn was at the forefront of a schism in The New Church, the outcome of which was the founding of the General Church of the New Jerusalem, a more conservative institution still based on Swedenborgian teachings that continues to be headquartered in Bryn Athyn. The Bryn Athyn Cathedral, its centerpiece, was built through the work of Pitcairn's son Raymond and Ralph Adams Cram. The creative workshops established by the Pitcairns for this effort also produced Raymond's house, Glencairn, next to Cairnwood, and Cairncrest, the home of Raymond's brother Harold. The design methods used in these workshops typified the Arts and Crafts movement, emphasizing a collaborative approach between architects and craftsmen, allowing the latter a more inspirational contribution to the final products. Ralph Adams Cram, who was eventually sidelined in the oversight of the cathedral's construction, wrote that "in its inception and its working out, it has been unique, not only in my own experience, but I believe in the architectural history of the last 400 years."

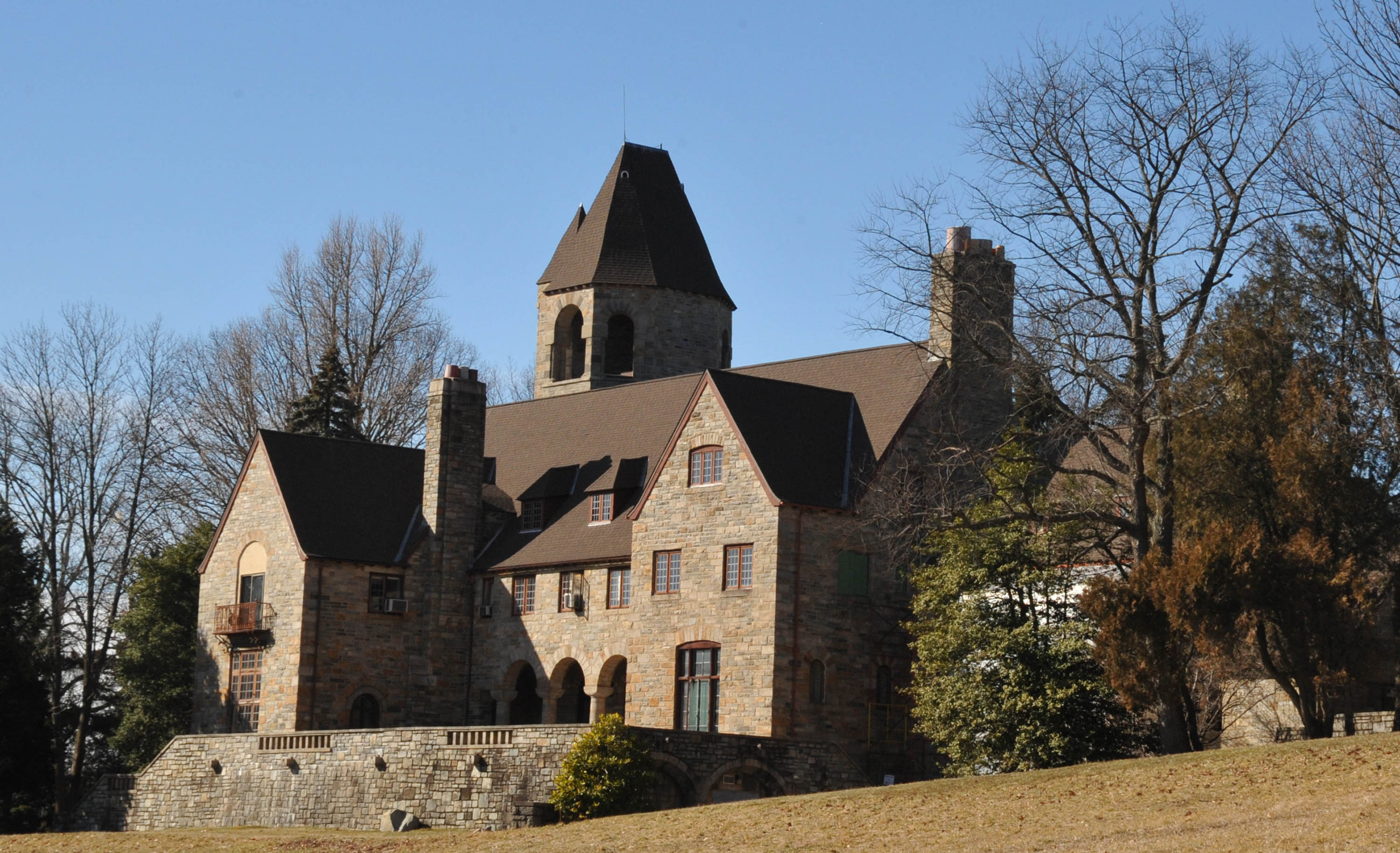
Cairncrest

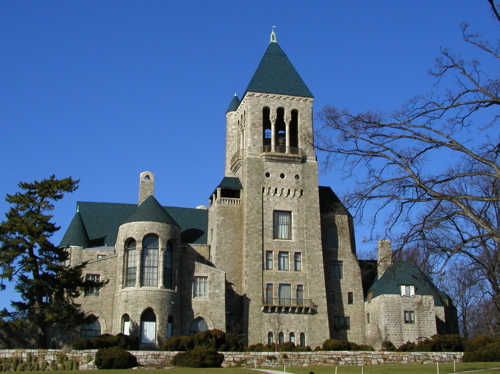
Glencairn Museum

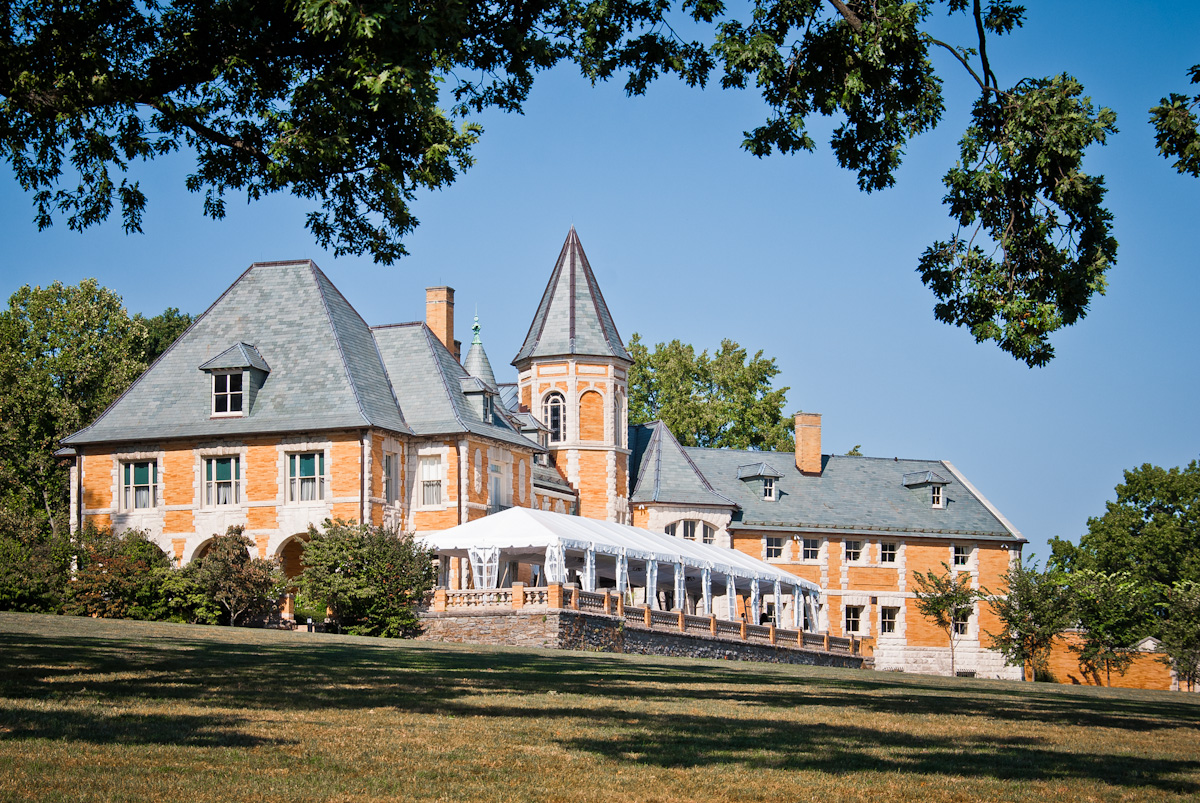
Cairnwood Mansion

== See also ==
- List of National Historic Landmarks in Pennsylvania
- National Register of Historic Places listings in Montgomery County, Pennsylvania
