= Shepherd Barrett =

American artist

Shepherd M. Barrett (c. December 6, 1889 - 1967) was an African-American folk artist sculptor from Huntingdon Valley, Pennsylvania.

== Art ==
Barrett made 225 sculptures over the course of 50 years. His medium of choice was carved wood, more particularly peach stone carvings. These sculptures were created using a variety of instruments such as knives, picks and needle sized manually operated drills and with such practiced skill that a work might be created in as little as two hours. Despite their diminutive size, his works were detailed, such as monkeys with facial expressions, fingers and toes.

== Personal life ==
Barrett also a general artist, and was a player of the violin, cello and viola. His hobbies included being a magician and ventriloquist. He worked as a fireman in Bryn Athyn, Pennsylvania from approximately 1953 to 1962. He died in Montgomery County, Pennsylvania in 1967.
