= Glencairn Museum =

Historic house in Pennsylvania, United States

- Glencairn
- U.S. National Register of Historic Places
- U.S. National Historic Landmark District – Contributing property
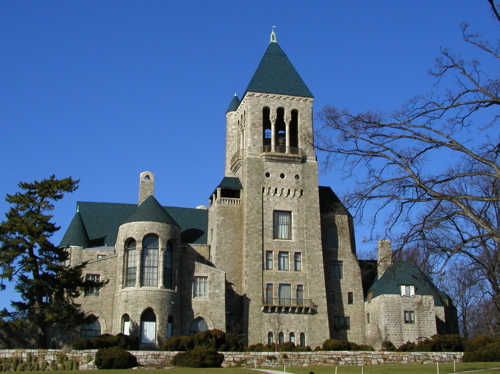
- Glencairn Museum, February 2007

- Location within Pennsylvania Location within the United States
- Location: 1001 Cathedral Rd., Bryn Athyn, Pennsylvania
- Coordinates: 40°08′11.88″N 75°03′51.43″W
- Area: 6.2 acres (2.5 ha)
- Built: 1928–39
- Built by: Raymond Pitcairn
- Architectural style: Late 19th And 20th Century Revivals, Late Romanesque
- Part of: Bryn Athyn Historic District (ID08001087)
- NRHP reference No.: 78002434

Significant dates
- Added to NRHP: August 31, 1978
- Designated NHLDCP: October 6, 2008

Glencairn is a castle-like mansion in Bryn Athyn, Pennsylvania, that was home to the Pitcairn family for more than 40 years. Now the Glencairn Museum, it contains a collection of about 8,000 artworks, mostly religious in nature, from cultures such as ancient Egypt, ancient Greece, the Roman Empire and medieval Europe, as well as Islamic, Asian, and Native American works. The museum is affiliated with The New Church, and the building is on the National Register of Historic Places.

== Mansion ==
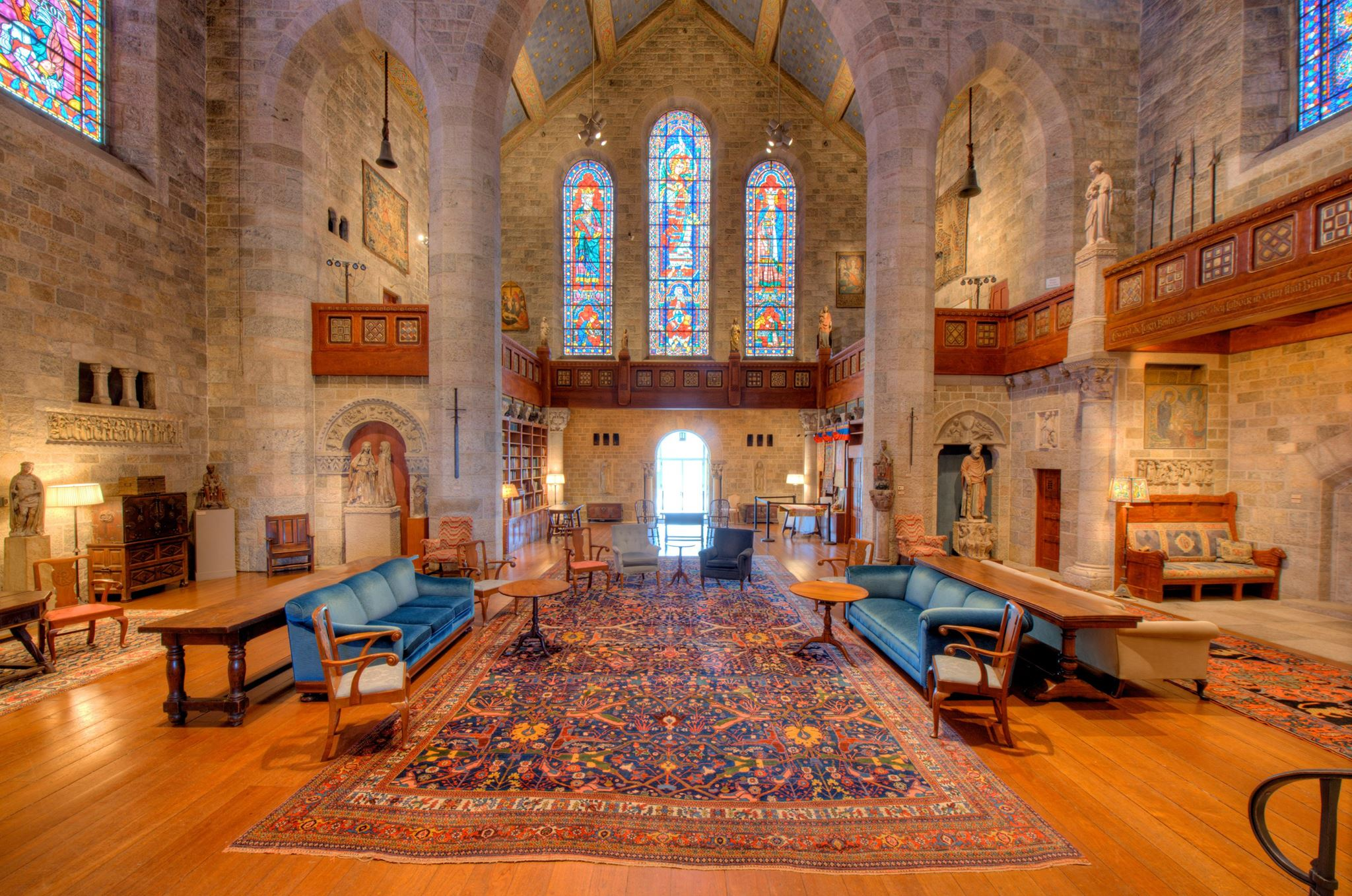
Great Hall, May 2017

Multi-millionaire businessman Raymond Pitcairn (1885–1966) and his wife, Mildred Glenn (died 1979) built "Glencairn" between 1928 and 1939. Its name was a combination of their surnames. Pitcairn, a member of the New Church himself, had no formal training in architecture and designed the Romanesque-style building using a series of models. The nine-story, granite-and-ruddy-colored-stone mansion features more than 90 rooms on 10 floors. It has three main sections – a central rectangle, and two large rectangular wings – that together measure approximately 175 feet by 135 feet. The exterior features a nine-story tower, carved doorways, pillars, and wall insets. The building also contains elaborate interior mosaics, monel metalwork, Early Medieval stained glass windows, and a replica of the Biblical tabernacle.

The Pitcairn fortune derived from control of Pittsburgh Plate Glass Company, of which his father John Pitcairn, Jr. (1841-1916), was director, 1896–1906. Adjacent to "Glencairn" is Raymond Pitcairn's first architectural success, the Gothic Revival Bryn Athyn Cathedral (1913–19), and his father's house "Cairnwood". The Pitcairns were funders of the American Liberty League. Following Mildred's death in 1979 (Raymond died in 1966), the mansion, with its collections and Pitcairn archives, was given to the Academy of the New Church.

"Glencairn" was added to the National Register of Historic Places in 1978 and is a contributing property of the Bryn Athyn Historic District.

== Glencairn Museum ==
Guided tours of the building and collection are available year-round. Tours are offered Tuesday through Friday at 2:30pm or by appointment, and weekends at 1:00, 2:30 and 3pm. The Museum's first floor, including the Great Hall, Upper Hall, Bird Room, and current temporary exhibition, is open for self-guided viewing on weekends from 1:00 to 4:30 pm.

Glencairn Museum also offers a variety of events and exhibitions throughout the year.

== See also ==
- National Register of Historic Places listings in Montgomery County, Pennsylvania
- Bryn Athyn College
