= Bryn Athyn Cathedral =

Historic church in Pennsylvania, United States

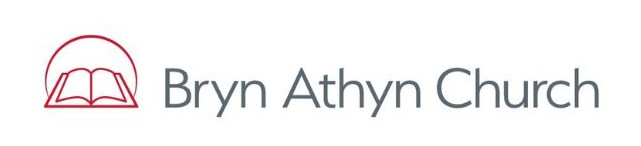
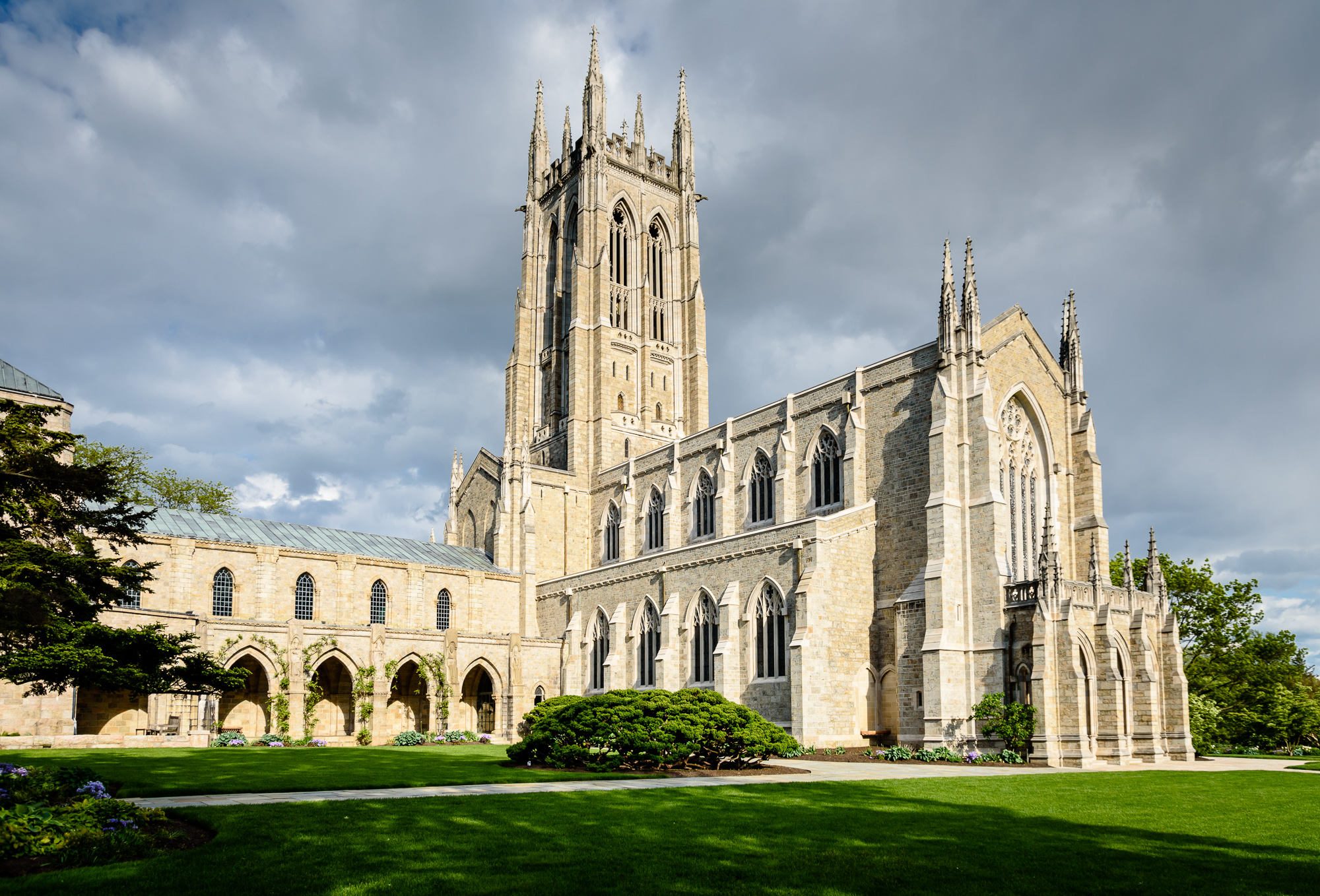

- Location within Pennsylvania Location within the United States

Religion
- Affiliation: General Church of the New Jerusalem (New Church)

Location
- Interactive map of Bryn Athyn Cathedral
- Coordinates: 40°08′04.02″N 75°03′48.58″W

Architecture
- Type: Cathedral
- Style: Gothic
- Funded by: John Pitcairn Jr.
- Groundbreaking: 1913
- Completed: 1928
- Pennsylvania Historical Marker
- Official name: Bryn Athyn Cathedral
- Type: Roadside
- Criteria: Religion
- Designated: September 10, 1947
- Parent listing: Bryn Athyn Historic District
- Location: Huntingdon Pike (PA 232) in Bryn Athyn at Cathedral
- Marker Text: This Swedenborgian center is noted architecturally. Buildings in 14th-century Gothic and 12th-century Romanesque styles. Built by cooperative craft guilds in medieval way. Endowed by John Pitcairn.

Website
- Bryn Athyn Cathedral

Bryn Athyn Cathedral is the episcopal seat of the General Church of the New Jerusalem, a denomination of Swedenborgianism. The main building is of the Early Gothic style, while the adjoining structures are of a transitional period reflective of a combination of both Gothic and Norman styles. The exterior appearance of the cathedral itself is reminiscent of Gloucester Cathedral in England.

The cathedral is located in Bryn Athyn, Montgomery County, Pennsylvania, just outside the city of Philadelphia. Bryn Athyn is also the site of the General Church affiliated Academy of the New Church, which publishes Swedenborgian literature, and is the parent organization of a high school, a four-year college (Bryn Athyn College of the New Church), a theological school, and the Emanuel Swedenborg Library.

== History ==
The cathedral was constructed from 1913 to 1919. The cathedral's initial design was by the Boston architecture firm of Ralph Adams Cram. The planning of the cathedral began under the direction of William Fredrick Pendleton, the bishop of the church, and John Pitcairn Jr., president of the Pittsburgh Plate Glass Company (now PPG Industries), who was the major benefactor donating the property and much of the funds to construct the cathedral. George E. Prindible furnished much of the lumber, hollow tiles, pipes and other materials used in its construction.

Raymond Pitcairn, John Pitcairn's son, became involved with the project and worked with the firm of Ralph Adams Cram. As time passed, the architecture firm became less involved with the work, leaving Raymond Pitcairn in charge. Pitcairn realized that the workers and artisans working on the cathedral should be directly employed by the church and that creative changes by artists and builders working together which happen during the design process should be nurtured rather than thwarted. This led to some very unorthodox construction practices. For example, rather than relying on blueprints and plans, almost every aspect of the design was made into scale models where Pitcairn and the workers could study, review and embellish their ideas before actually constructing them.

Another aspect of the cathedral which is unusual is that asymmetries and irregularities were planned into the building as it was built. This is largely the result of Raymond Pitcairn's attendance at a 1915 lecture by William Henry Goodyear who stated that irregularities and asymmetries in medieval buildings were not errors but were carefully planned in the structures.

=== Stained glass windows ===
The stained glass windows of Bryn Athyn Cathedral are worthy of note. The medieval method of creating stained glass, namely of melting various pigment and metallic oxides into the glass itself and then having a glass blower create a disk of glass with varying degrees of thickness and brightness, was revived. The first glass was blown in 1922 and the last was created in the 1940s, however all the windows themselves were not completed until the 1960s. The windows are essentially of three designs:

- Biblical figures represented in monumental scale;
- Medallions depicting events either in the life of Christ or the Old Testament prophets; and
- grisaille windows of geometric design and pearl-like translucency which fill the cathedral with light.

Most of the metal in the cathedral is Monel Metal.

== Location ==
The Ezekiel Tower, located south of the main 150 ft tower, was built between the years 1920–1926. The Choir Hall and Michael Tower lie to the north of the main cathedral. This addition was completed in 1929 and even though this is the last completed portion of the complex, its architecture is from the earliest period.

Right next to the college, the library and the cathedral is the academy-affiliated Glencairn Museum. Originally the private residence of Raymond Pitcairn, this castle-like building now houses a collection of mostly religious artwork from around the world and is open to the public.

The cathedral is part of the Bryn Athyn Historic District, which was listed as a National Historic Landmark on October 7, 2008.

== Gallery ==
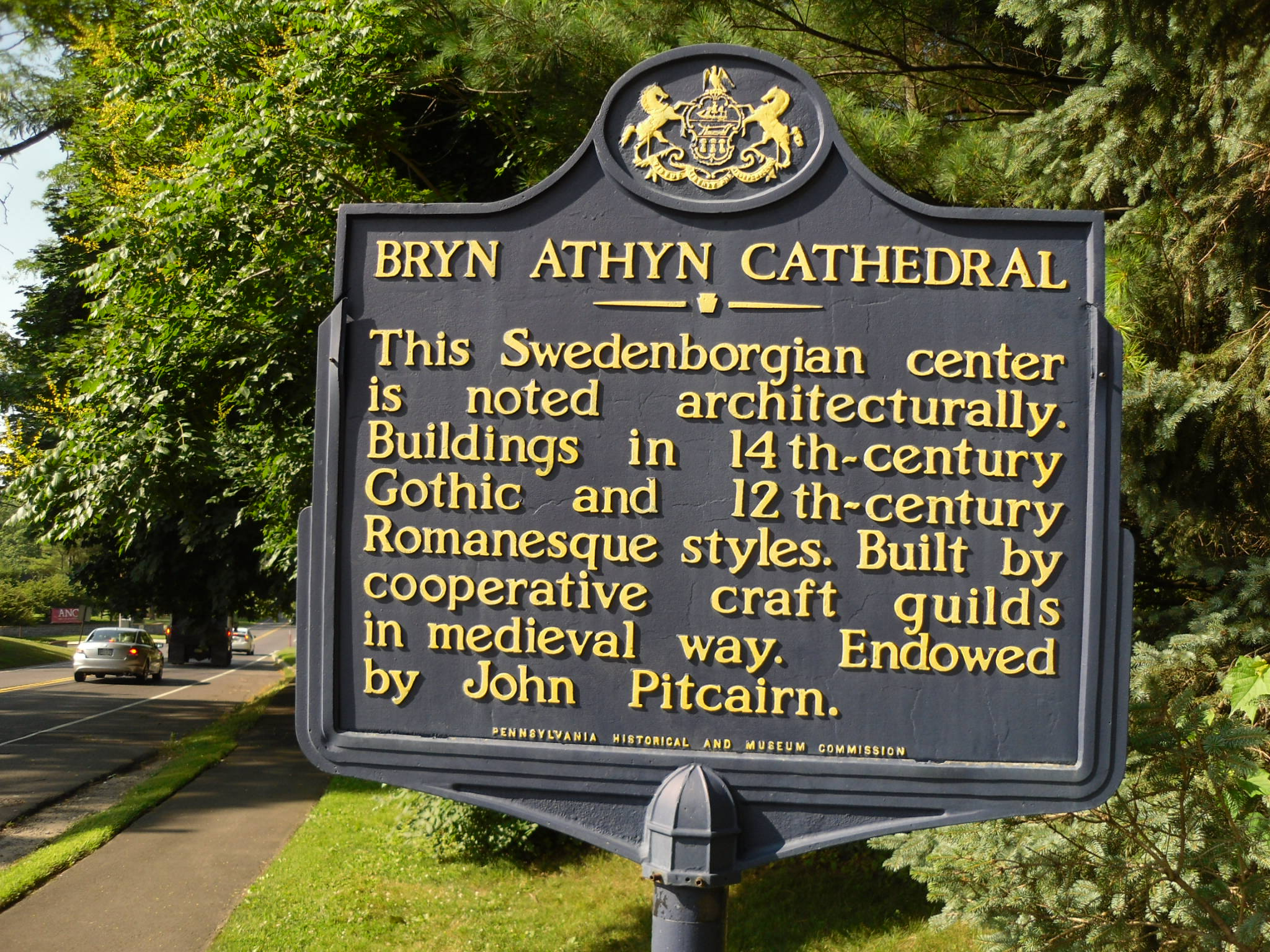
Pennsylvania State Historical Marker

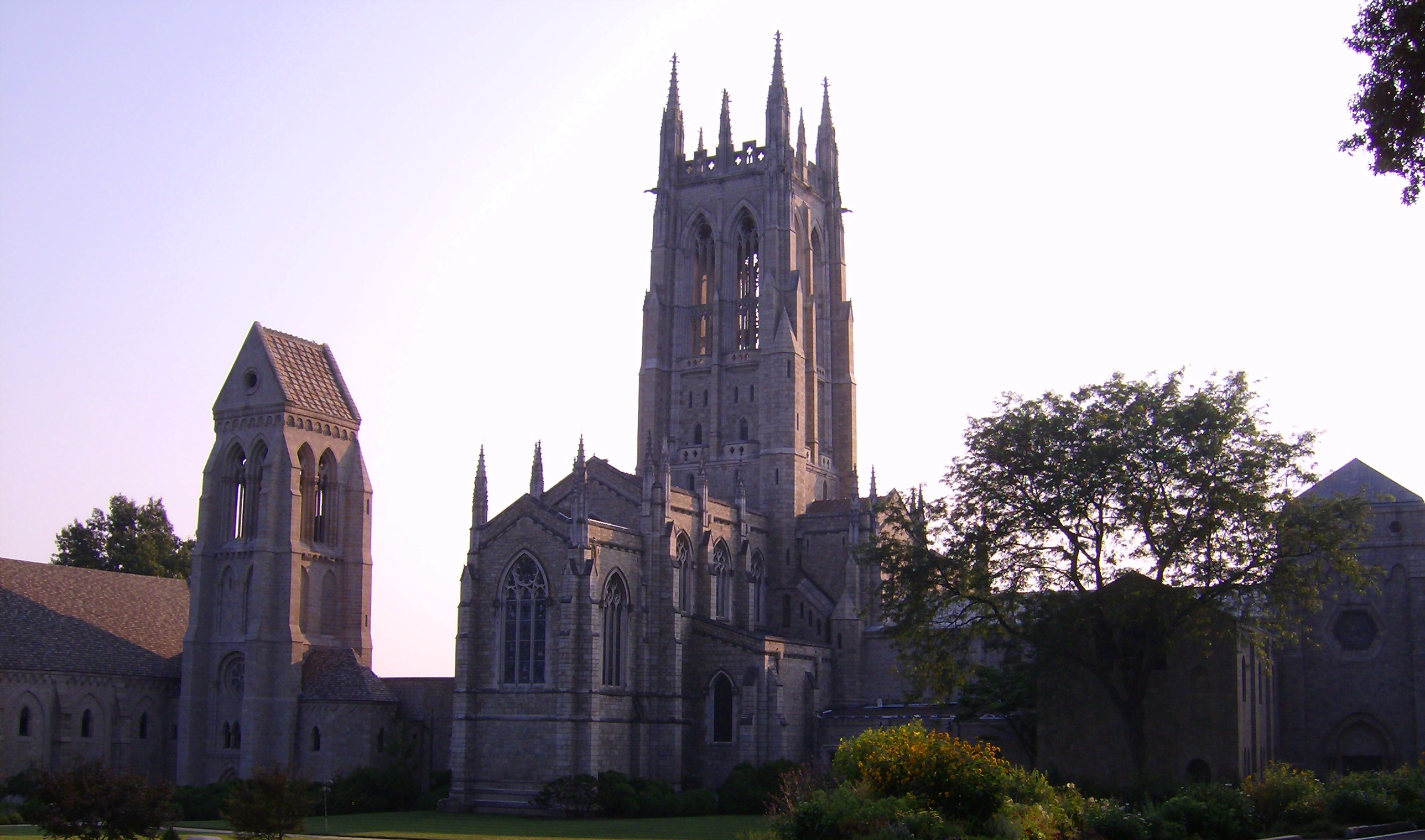
Bryn Athyn Cathedral

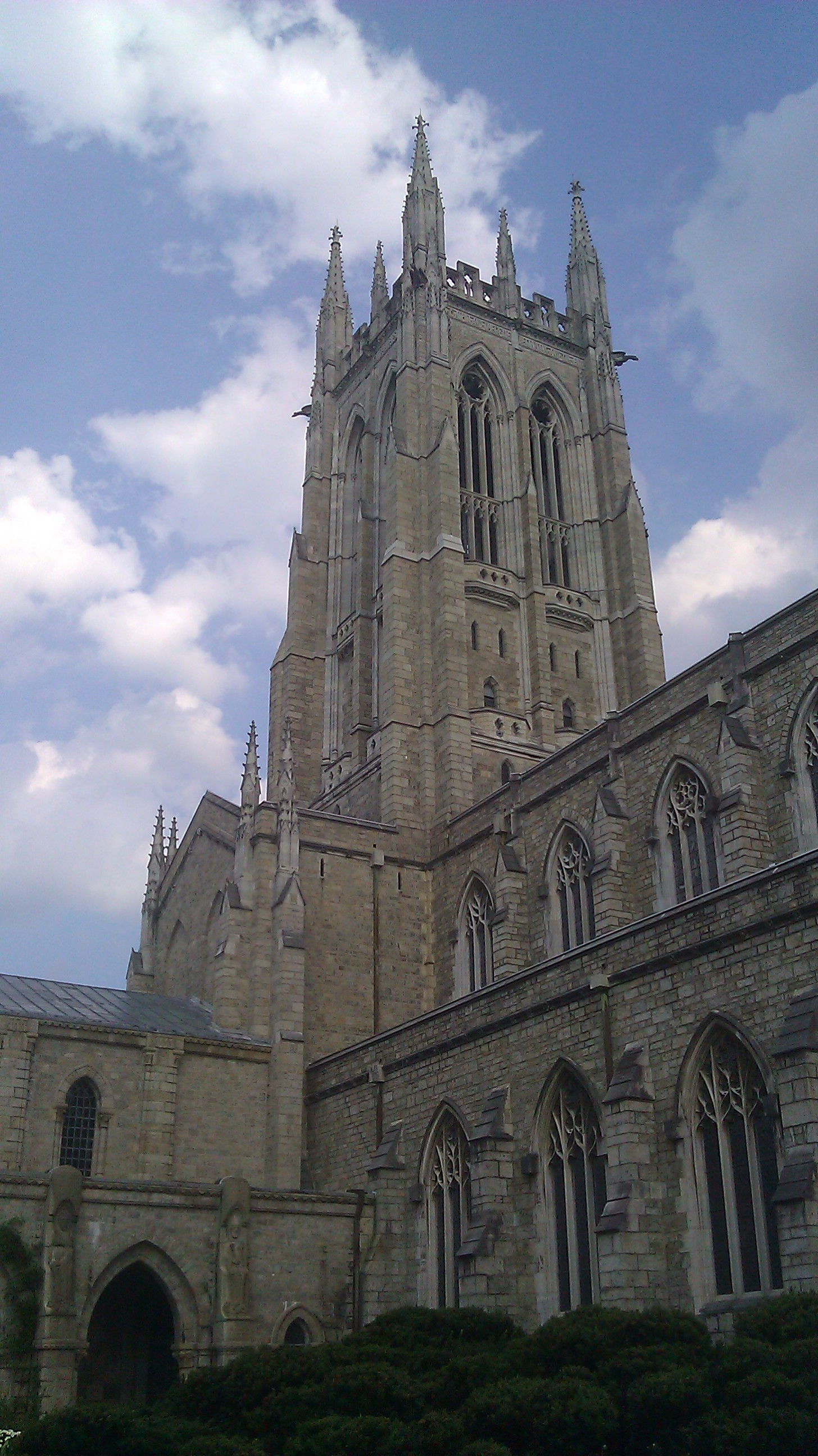
Bryn Athyn Cathedral

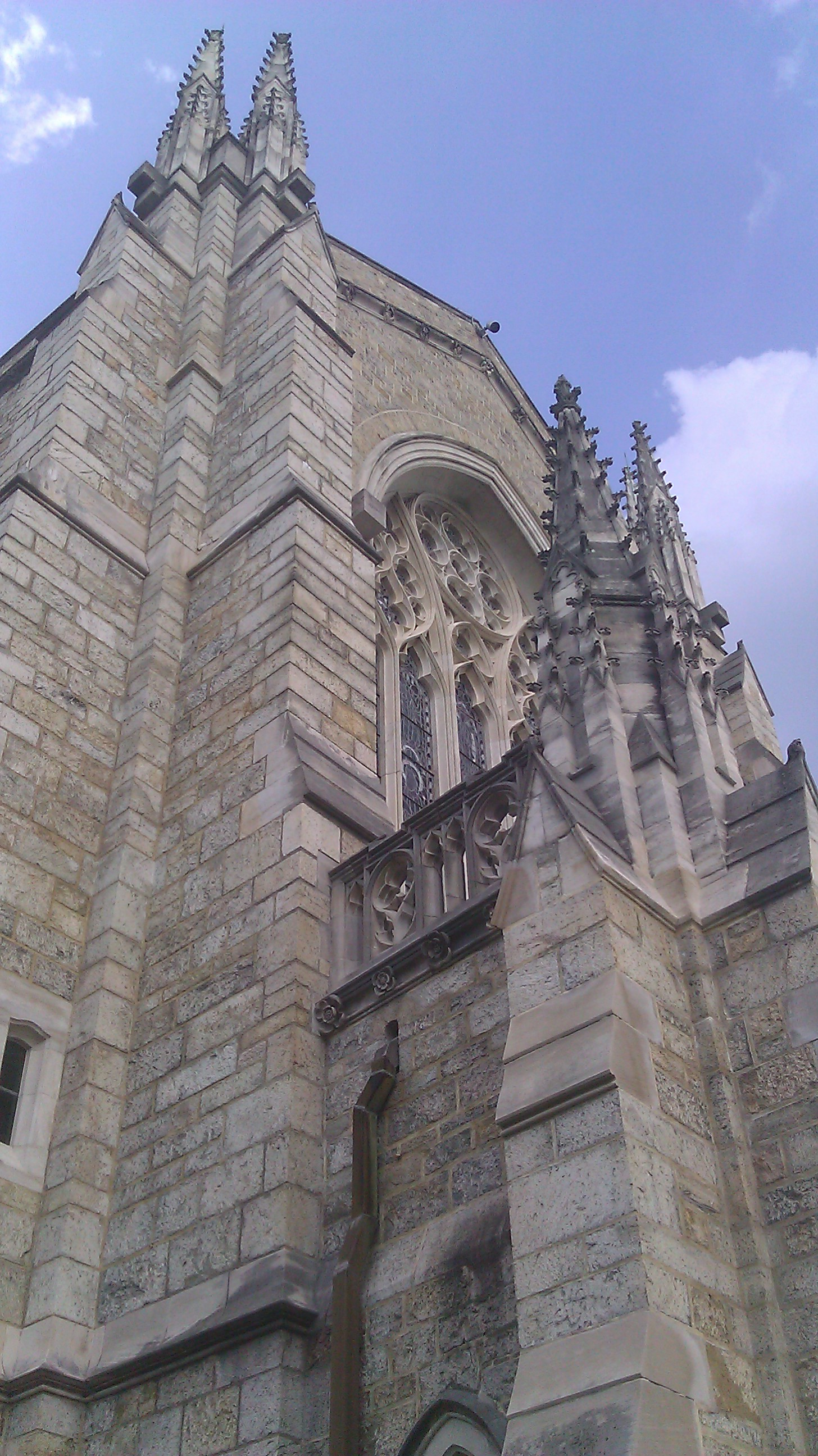
Bryn Athyn Cathedral

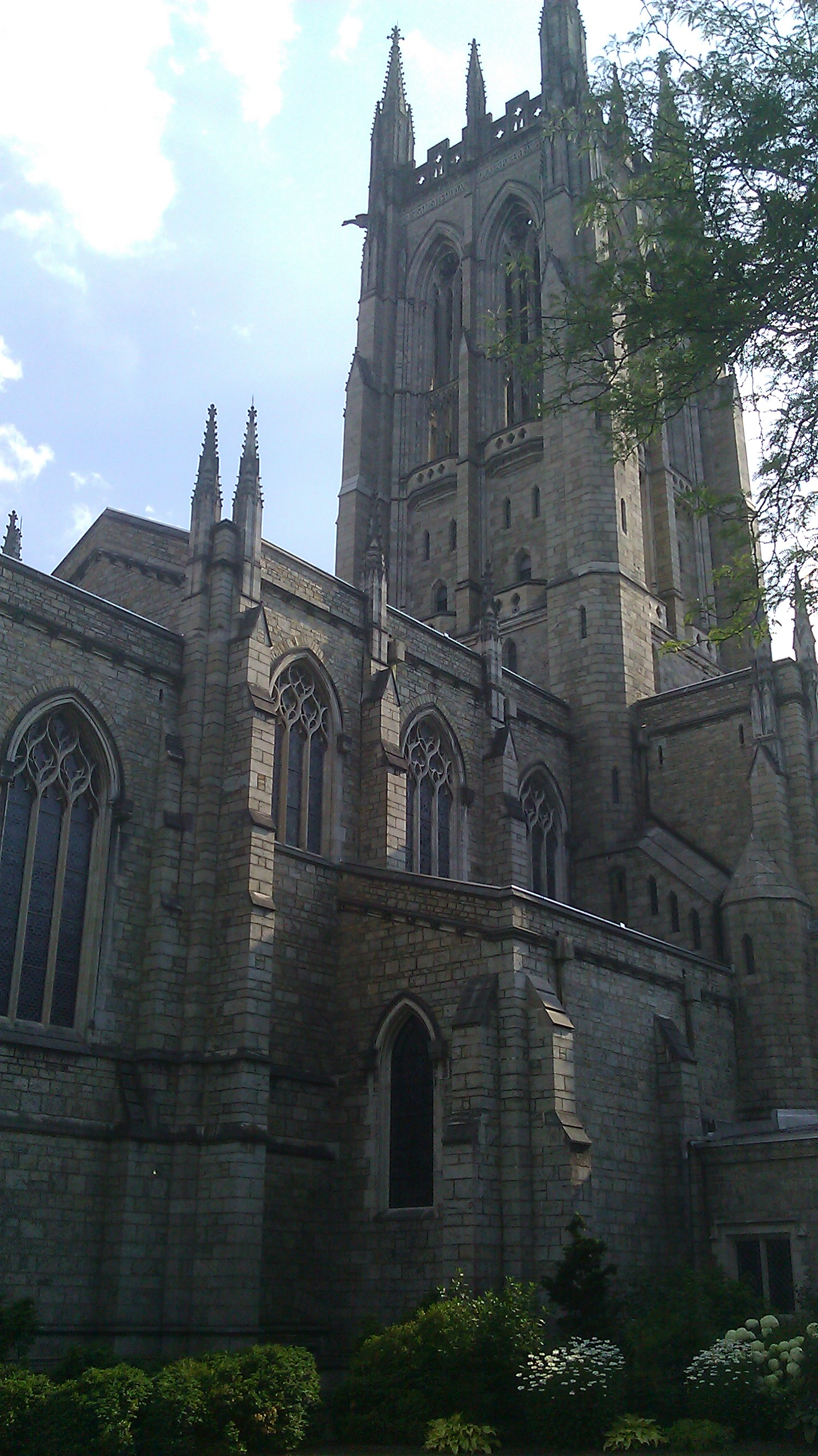
Bryn Athyn Cathedral

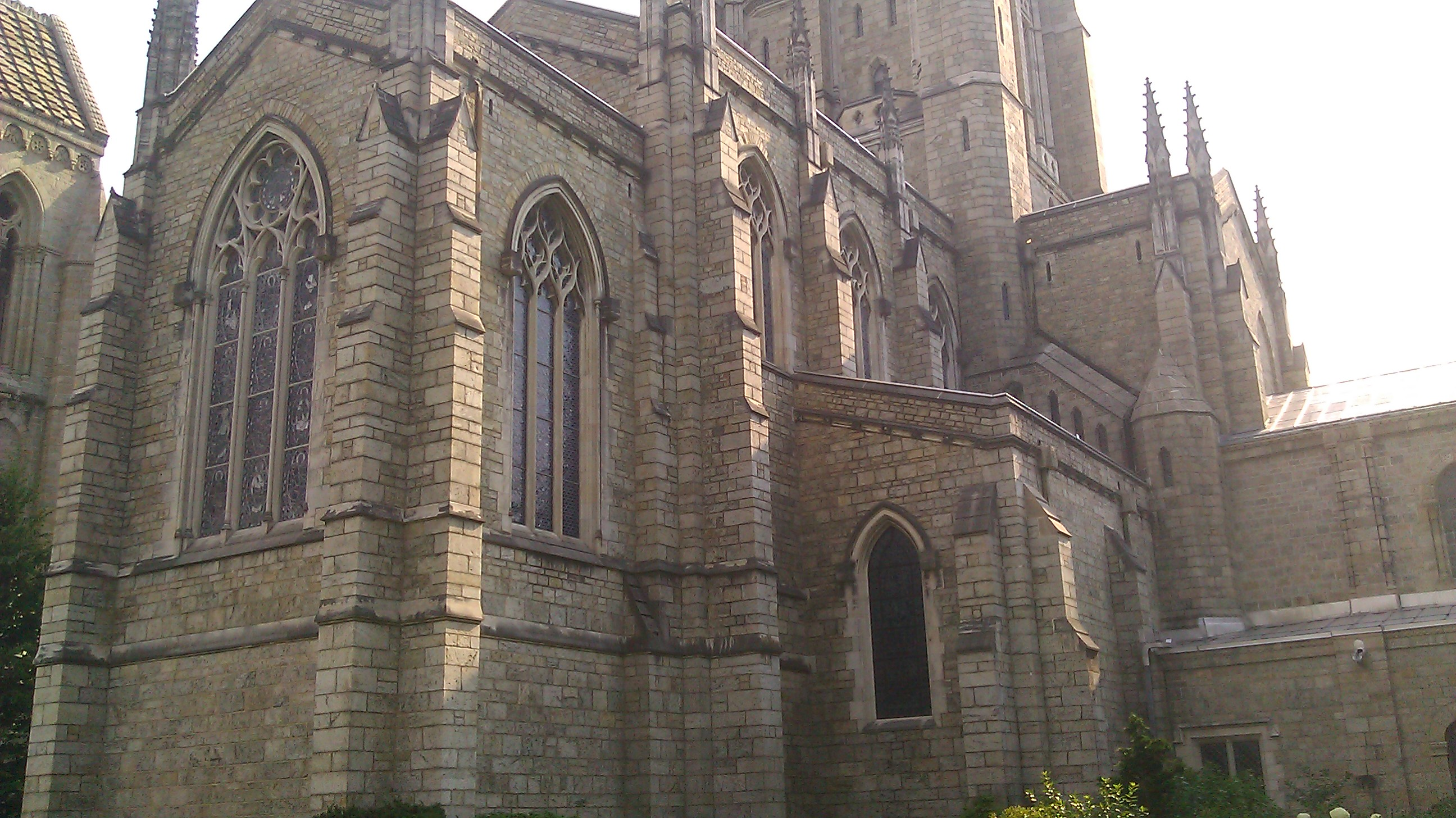
Bryn Athyn Cathedral

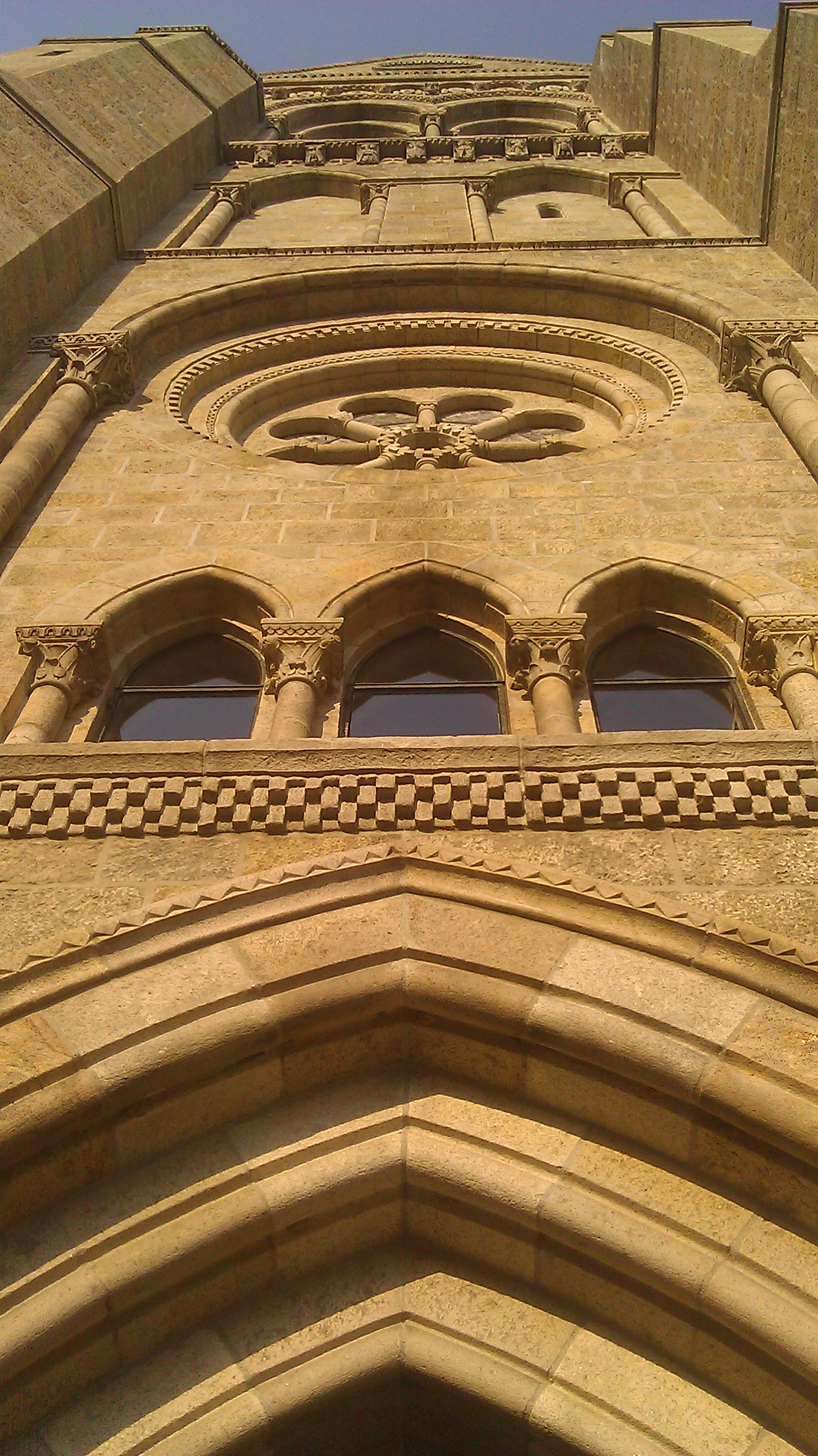
Bryn Athyn Cathedral

== See also ==
- Swedenborgianism
- The New Church
- Bryn Athyn College
