= Cairnwood =

Historic house in Pennsylvania, United States

- U.S. National Register of Historic Places
- U.S. National Historic Landmark District – Contributing property
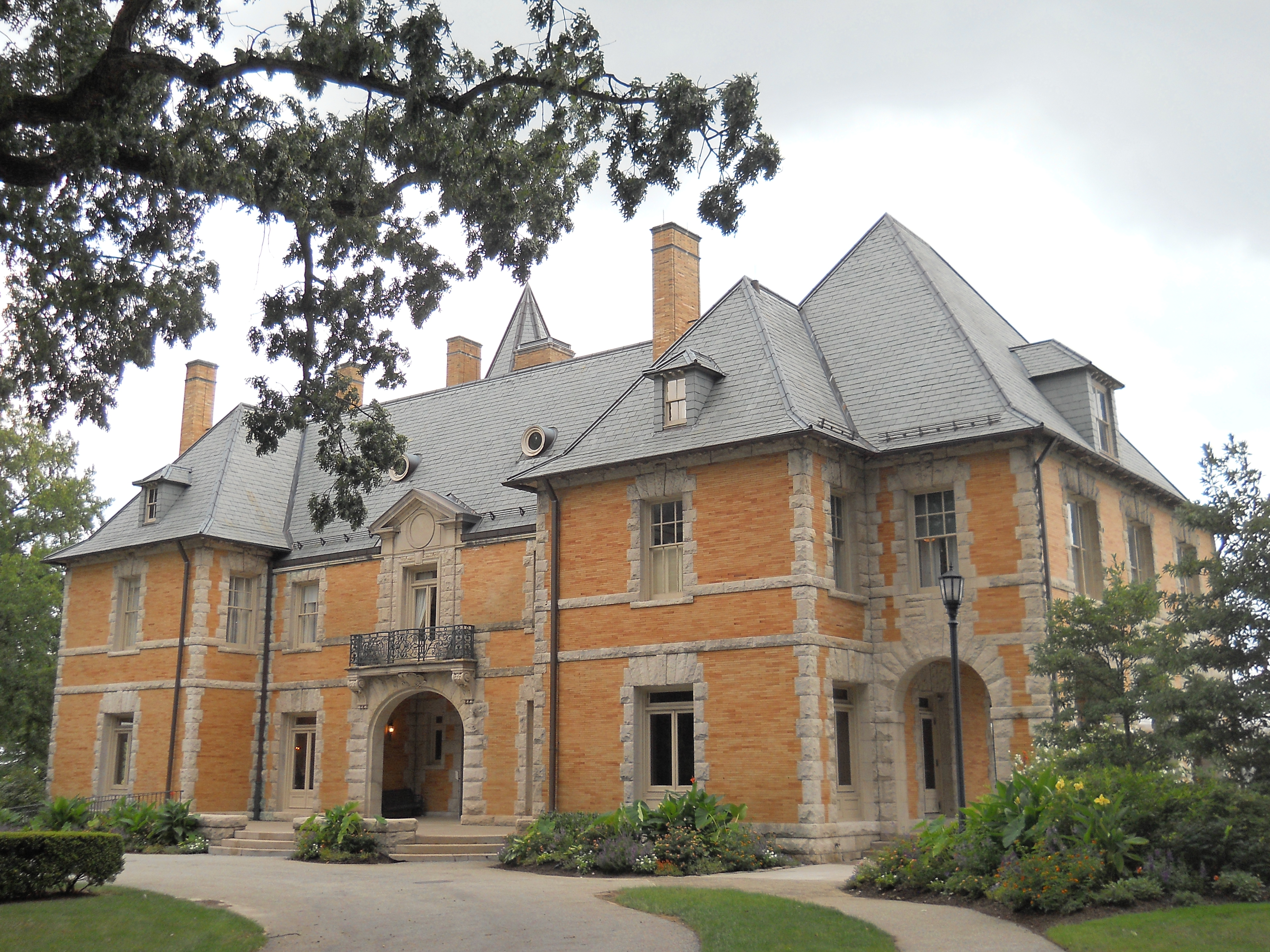
- Cairnwood, September 2012

- Location within Pennsylvania Location within the United States
- Location: 3028 Huntington Pike, Bryn Athyn, Pennsylvania
- Coordinates: 40°8′21″N 75°3′46″W
- Area: 6.8 acres (2.8 ha)
- Built: 1895; 131 years ago
- Architect: Carrere, John; Hastings, Thomas
- Architectural style: Beaux Arts
- Part of: Bryn Athyn Historic District (ID08001087)
- NRHP reference No.: 02000223

Significant dates
- Added to NRHP: March 21, 2002
- Designated NHLDCP: October 6, 2008

Cairnwood is a 26,000-square-foot (2,400 m^{2}) historic home next to the Glencairn Museum in the borough of Bryn Athyn in Montgomery County, Pennsylvania, U.S. It was designed by the architectural firm of Carrère and Hastings and built in 1895. The surrounding grounds were designed by Olmsted, Olmsted and Eliot. It was built for John Pitcairn, Jr. (1841–1916), President of Pittsburgh Plate Glass Company. It is a 2½-story, Roman brick and limestone French country estate home in the Beaux Arts style. The L-plan house has 28 rooms, plus a chapel in the third story turret. Also on the property are a contributing stable and garden house built contemporary to the main house, and garage complex (1911). A contributing structure is the estate wall. The property is now owned by the Academy of the New Church and serves as a special events facility, specifically hosting weddings, corporate functions, fundraising and social events of all kinds.

It was added to the National Register of Historic Places in 2002. It is a contributing property to the Bryn Athyn Historic District.

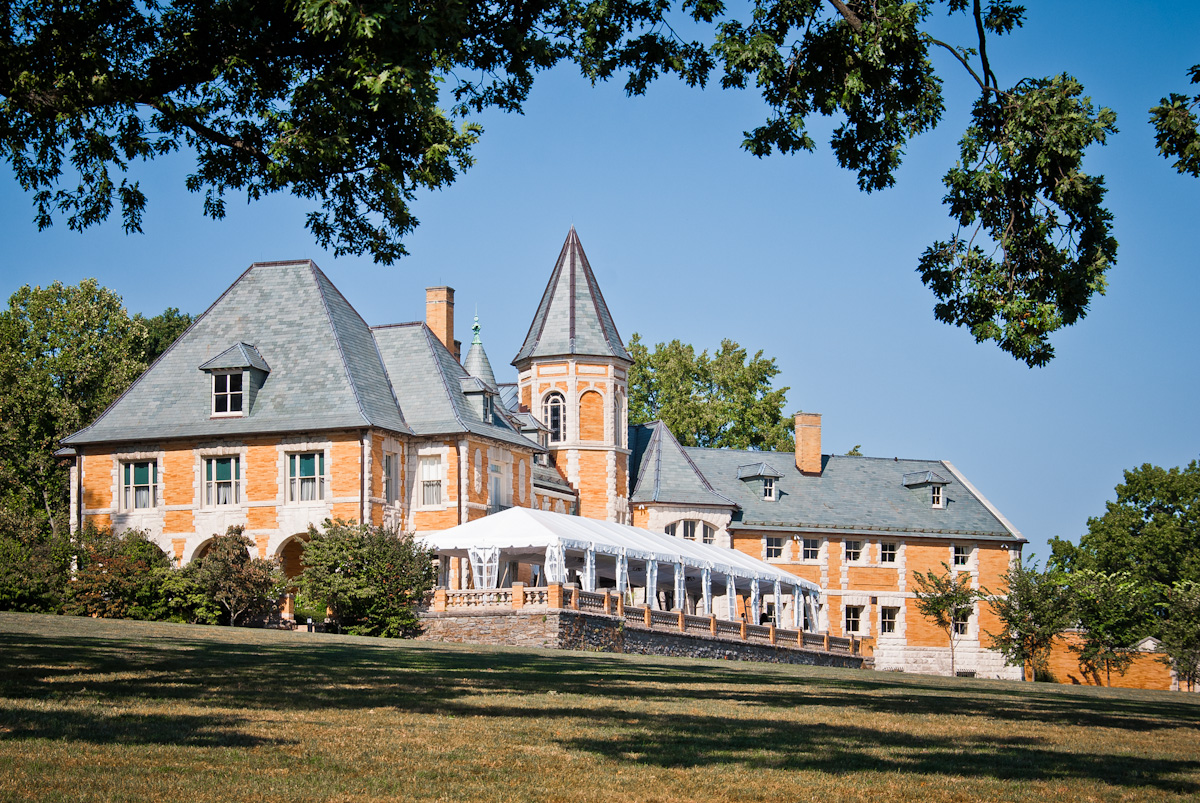
Cairnwood Mansion, east side

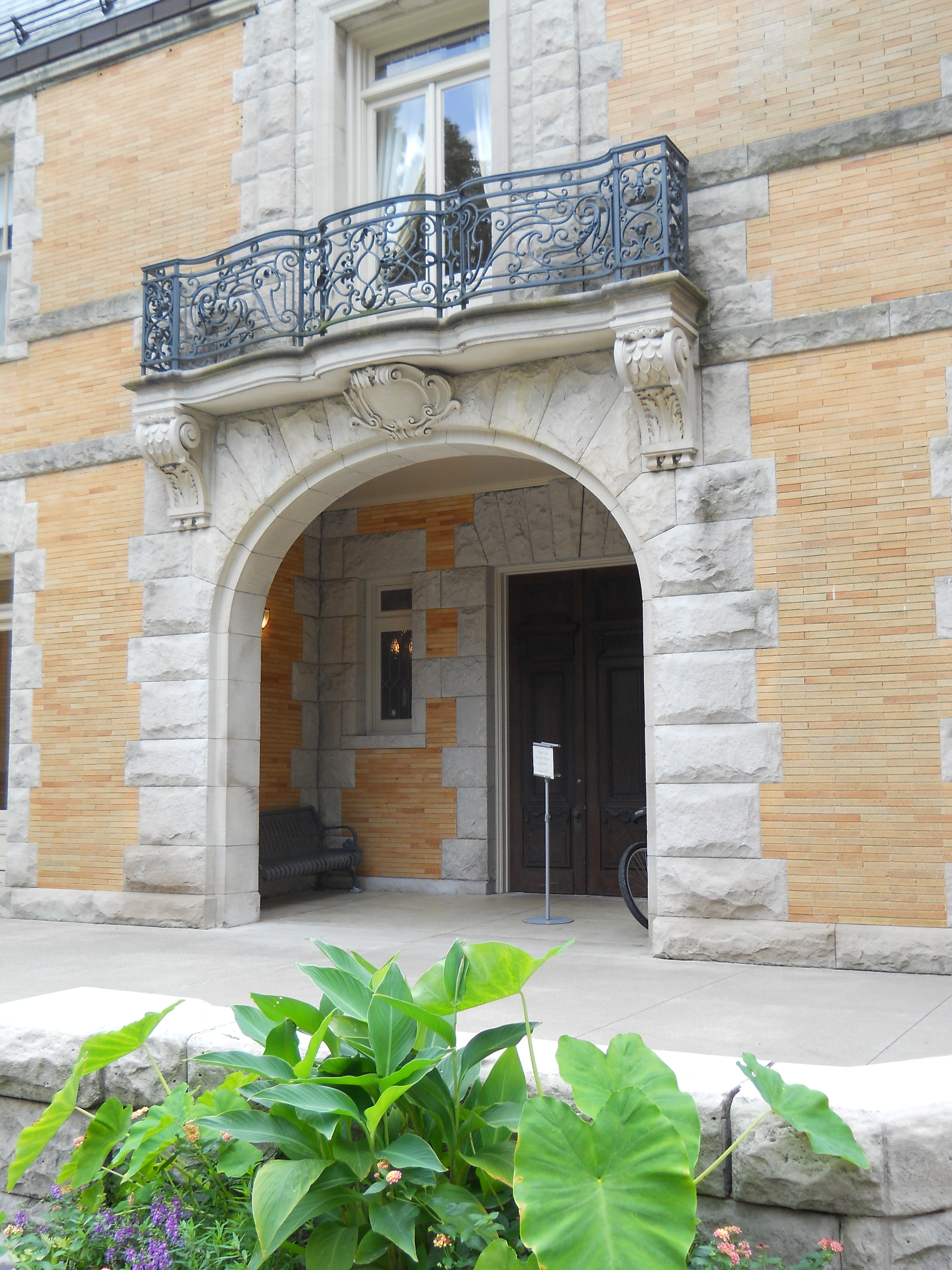
Central entrance

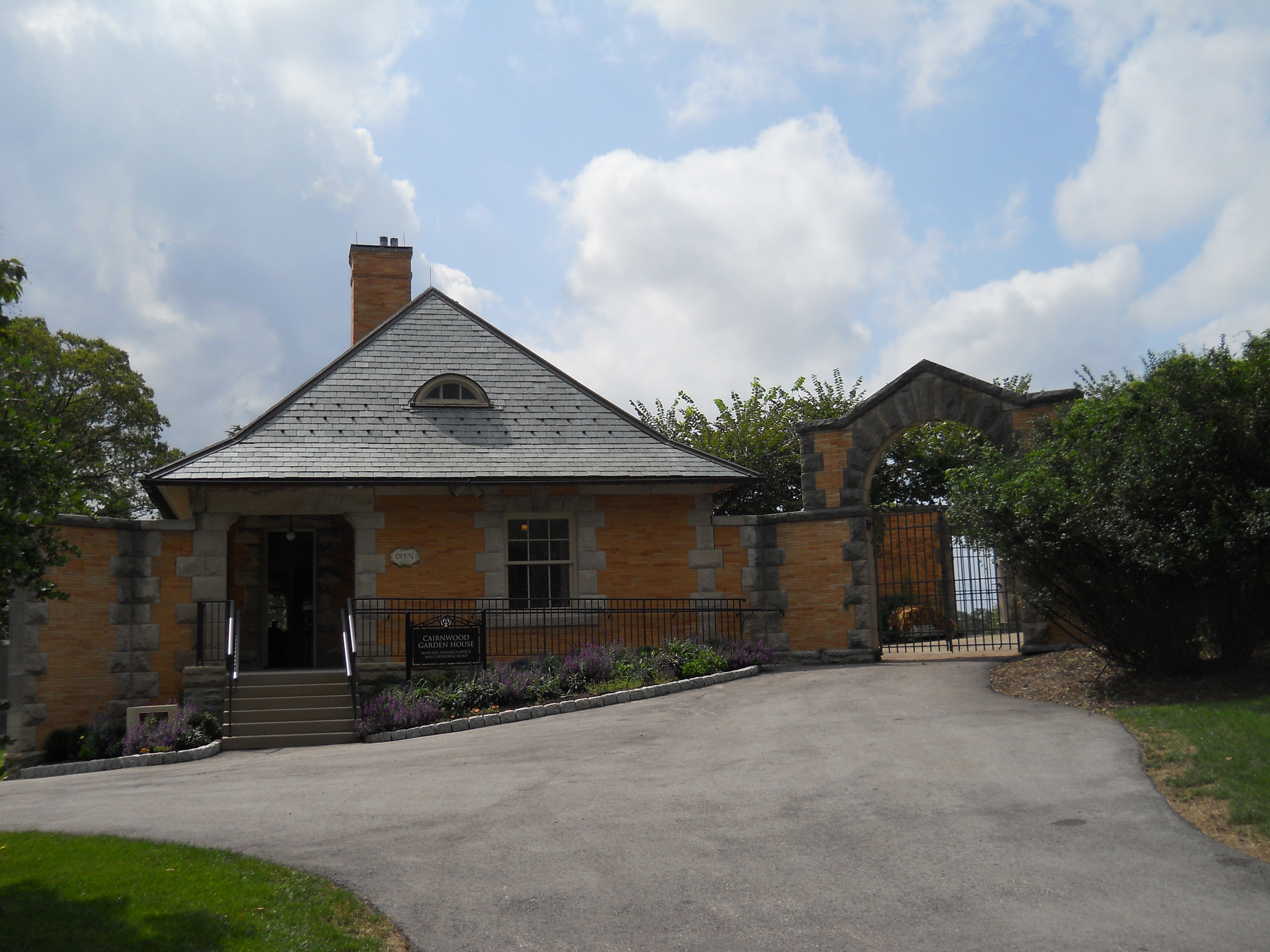
Garden House

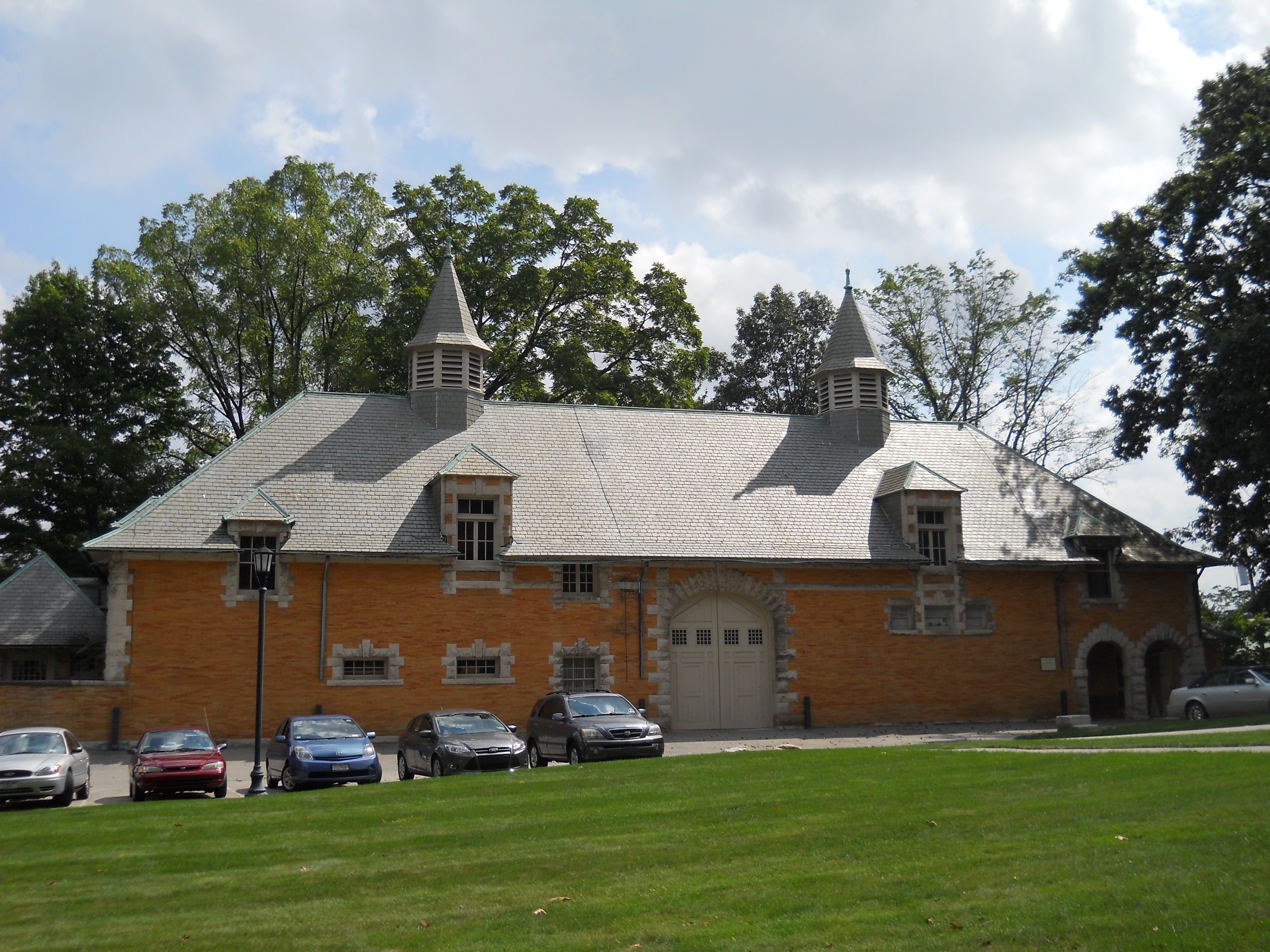
Stables & Carriage House

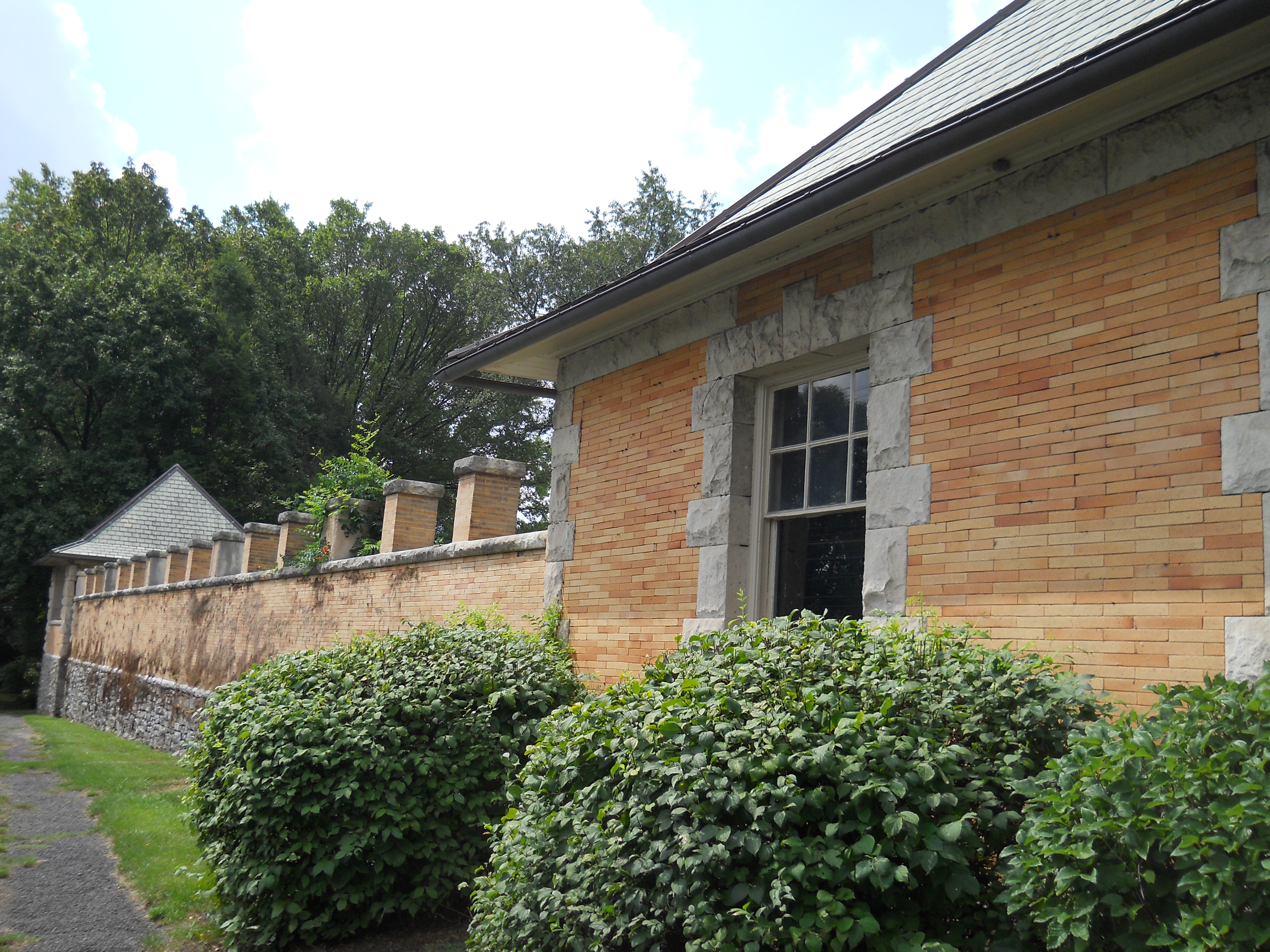
Outside wall
