= Bryn Athyn School District =

School district in Pennsylvania

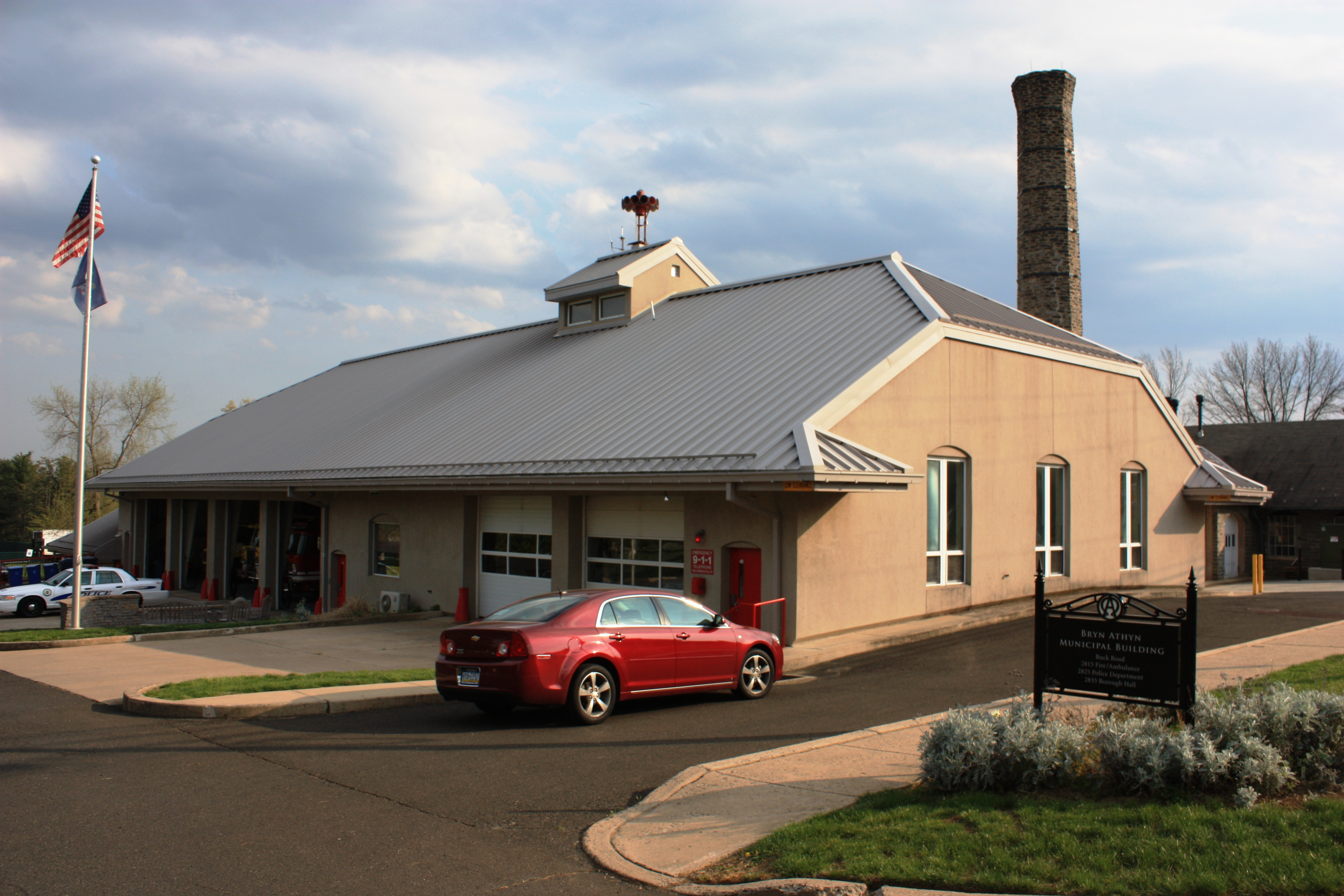
- School board meetings are conducted in the municipal building

Address
- 2835 Buck Road Bryn Athyn, Pennsylvania, 19009; United States

District information
- Type: Public
- NCES District ID: 4204090

Other information
- Website: www.brynathynschooldistrict.org

The Bryn Athyn School District is a public school district in Montgomery County, Pennsylvania, United States. While it is designed to serve residents of the small Philadelphia suburb of Bryn Athyn, it has never contained a school. 90% of students in the affluent and highly religious community attend private schools operated by the General Church of the New Jerusalem, which has its global headquarters in the borough. The remaining students attend Lower Moreland Township School District. The Bryn Athyn School District is one of just four in the state to not operate a high school; Midland Borough School District in Beaver County and Saint Clair Area School District in Schuylkill County have avoided consolidation by continuing primary education only, while Duquesne City School District, which features the lowest test scores in the state, in Allegheny County had its high school closed by state mandate.

The district exists so the residents can have a lower public school tax rate, as the majority prefer using private schools.

The board of education conducts its meetings in the municipal building.

== History ==
By 1963, the State of Pennsylvania attempted to merge Bryn Athyn into the Lower Moreland district and the Upper Moreland School District so one district would remain, but did not do so after a lawsuit went in favor of the residents.

== Demographics ==
In 1963 the district had 11 students attending public school. In 1969 the district had 14 students attending public school, all at Lower Moreland. In 1988 the district had 10 students attending public school, and at the time students could choose either Lower Moreland or Upper Moreland. In 1994 it had nine attending public school, all at Lower Moreland.
