= Bryn Athyn College =

College in Bryn Athyn, Pennsylvania, US

Coordinates: 40°08′05.45″N 75°03′35.80″W

Bryn Athyn College of the New Church
- Former name: Academy of the New Church College (1877–1997)
- Motto: Become a Better You.
- Type: Private college
- Established: 1877; 149 years ago
- Religious affiliation: General Church of the New Jerusalem
- President: Sean Connelly
- Faculty: 28
- Students: 285
- Location: Bryn Athyn, Pennsylvania, United States
- Campus: Suburban, 130 acres (53 ha)
- Colors: Red and white
- Sporting affiliations: NCAA Division III: UEC; ACHA: CSCHC (ice hockey, DII, M) (Note: Bryn Athyn announced the discontinuation of its athletic programs at the conclusion of the 2024–25 school year.)
- Mascot: Lion
- Website: brynathyn.edu

Bryn Athyn College of the New Church is a private Christian college in Bryn Athyn, Pennsylvania, United States. It is affiliated with the General Church of the New Jerusalem.

== History ==
Bryn Athyn College started educating undergraduates after its incorporation under the laws of the Commonwealth of Pennsylvania in 1877. Then known as the Academy of the New Church, in 1890, the academy established a separate organization, the General Church of the New Jerusalem, a religious body based on the teachings of Emanuel Swedenborg. After receiving an endowment from John Pitcairn and others, the Academy of the New Church expanded from a seminary into a high school and a two-year college. In 1914, it became a four-year college, and by 1922, the college was also conferring Bachelor of Arts and Bachelor of Science degrees. In 1997, the Academy of the New Church College adopted a new name: Bryn Athyn College of the New Church.

In August 2008, the college opened several new student residence cottages. A new science center and a new admissions and student life building were completed in September 2009.

As of 2024, the president of the college is Sean Connelly.

== Campus ==
The college's original campus and surrounding community of Bryn Athyn were designed in 1893 by Charles Eliot of the firm Olmsted, Olmsted and Eliot. The campus is located in the borough of Bryn Athyn, in the suburbs of Philadelphia.

Much of the college's 130-acre (53 ha) campus is undeveloped open land, and the nearby Pennypack Ecological Restoration Trust supplements the natural surroundings with eight miles (13 km) of trails following a creek through woods and fields.

== Facilities ==
Facilities include a performing arts center, a fine arts center, an ice-rink, pavilion, café and social center, as well as historic buildings.

=== Buildings in the Historic District ===
- Glencairn Museum's ancient Egyptian, Greek, and Roman, medieval Christian, Islamic, Asian, and Native American collections help to inform visitors on the history of religion. The museum was built between 1928 and 1939 as a home for Raymond and Mildred Pitcairn. In 1979, the building was donated to the Academy of the New Church to serve as the school's museum of medieval and religious art.
- Bryn Athyn Cathedral is the center of the New Church community and serves as a religious center for Bryn Athyn College students. Construction on the Gothic revivalist architecture began in 1913, and carried on until 1928, with work on the stained glass windows and interior decoration continuing into the early 1940s and beyond. In Bryn Athyn Cathedral there are no right angles or straight lines. The walls of the building are skewed against each other, bowing out in the middle only to return at the opposite wall.
- Cairnwood was designed by the architectural firm Carrère and Hastings and was completed in 1895. It served as the home of John Pitcairn, founder of the Pittsburgh Plate Glass Company, and his wife Gertrude until 1916, after which it stood vacant for several years. In 1994, the Academy of the New Church renovated the building and it now functions as a cultural and hospitality center serving the college, community, and surrounding area.

== Religion ==
Bryn Athyn College is affiliated with the New Church, a branch of Christianity based on the Bible and the theological writings of Emanuel Swedenborg. The college offers religious courses, a religion major, and worship services.

Education at Bryn Athyn emphasizes the practical application of truth to life and encourages students to connect their spiritual beliefs to both their studies and their daily lives. Student conduct policies are guided by moral principles, with a particular emphasis on acting honestly, respectfully, and charitably and living a life of useful service.

The college's Mission Statement notes that, "Bryn Athyn College of the New Church serves as an intellectual center for all who desire to pursue a higher education in the liberal arts and sciences, enriched and structured by the Old and New Testaments and the writings of Emanuel Swedenborg. The purpose of this education is to enhance students' civil, moral, and spiritual lives, as well as to contribute to human spiritual welfare.".

== Academics ==
The college's educational philosophy is grounded in the teachings of Emanuel Swedenborg and the benefits of a liberal arts program. The curriculum emphasizes experiential learning.

In the academic year 2020–21, the college had 272 students who were studying across 12 undergraduate programs. The college also enrolled 190 students studying two online courses.

The college operates on a trimester system.

== Athletics ==
The Bryn Athyn athletic teams were called the Lions. The college was a member of the Division III ranks of the National Collegiate Athletic Association (NCAA); primarily competing as a member of the United East Conference (UEC) from 2023–24 until the end of the 2024–25 academic year. The Lions previously competed as a member of the Colonial States Athletic Conference (CSAC) from 2018–19 to 2022–23, as well as having a stint in the UEC from 2014–15 to 2017–18, back when the conference was known as the North Eastern Athletic Conference (NEAC), and as an NCAA Division III Independent during the 2013–14 school year under an exploratory basis. Prior to the 2014 season, Bryn Athyn competed as a member of the United States Collegiate Athletic Association (USCAA).

Bryn Athyn competed in 11 intercollegiate sports teams. Men's sports included basketball, cross country, lacrosse, soccer and volleyball; while women's sports included basketball, cross country, lacrosse, soccer, tennis and volleyball. It also had a club sports team in men's ice hockey. In 2020–21, almost 22% of students participated in an athletic team.

=== Discontinuation ===
On March 26, 2025, Bryn Athyn announced that they would be eliminating all 11 of its NCAA sports teams and its club hockey team due to the school's financial instability. The teams as well as athletic staff and trainer positions were eliminated at the end of the academic year.

== Student life ==
Bryn Athyn student life is largely student-run. Student Government and the Social Committee plan regular activities both on and off campus.
