= Bryn Athyn, Pennsylvania =

Borough in Pennsylvania, US

Borough of Bryn Athyn
- Home-rule borough
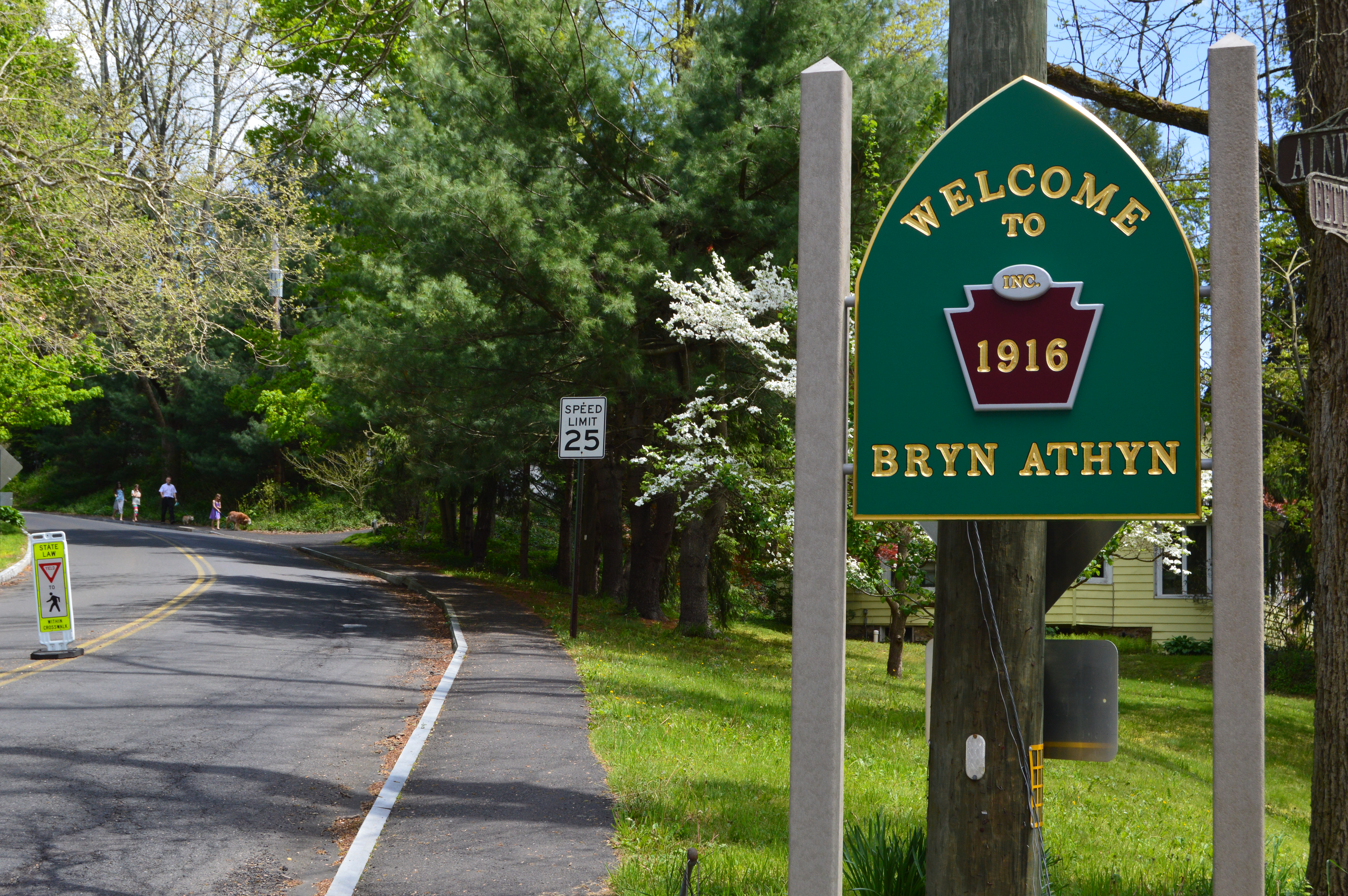

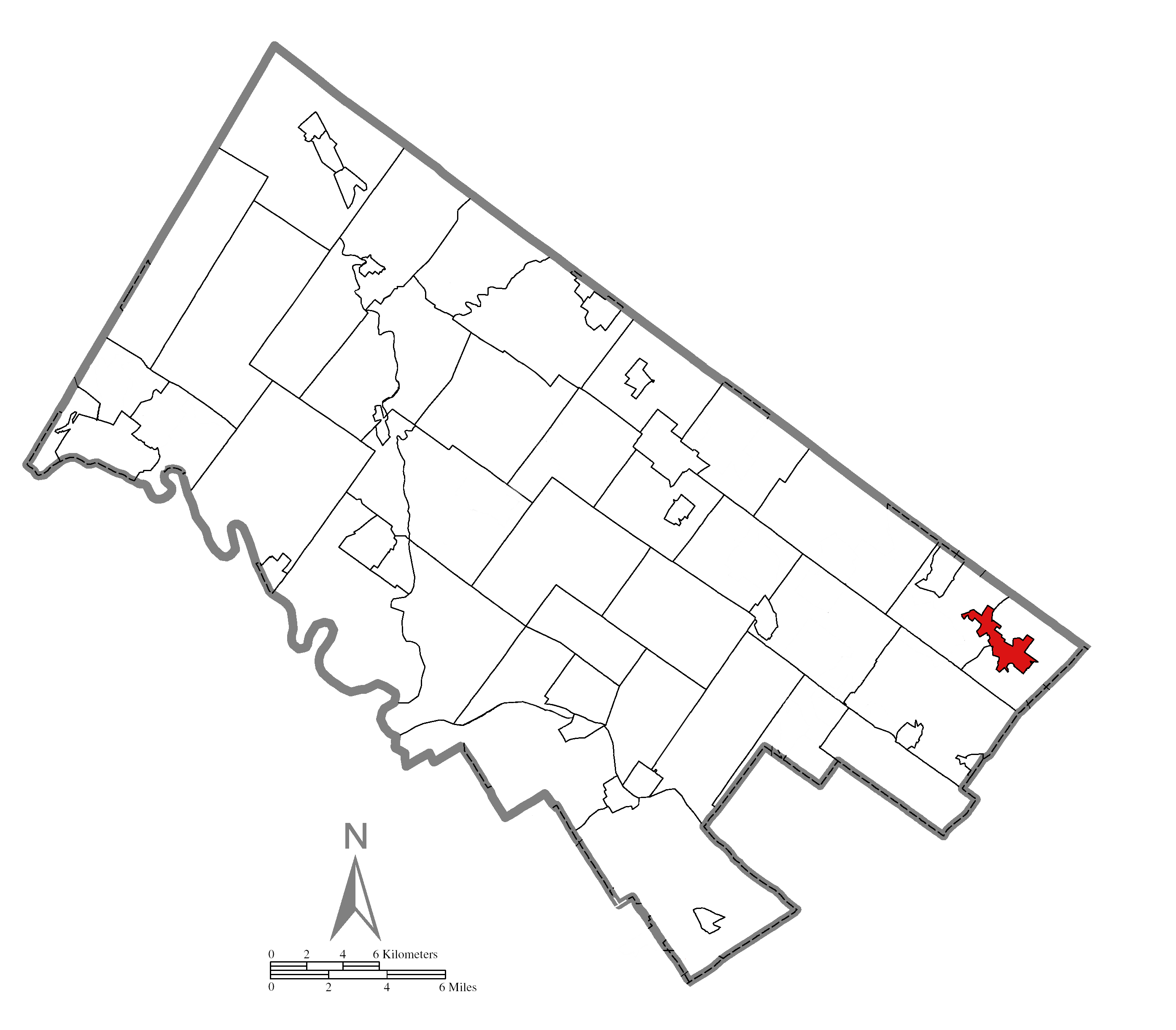
- Location of Bryn Athyn in Montgomery County, Pennsylvania.

- Location of Bryn Athyn in Pennsylvania Bryn Athyn (the United States)
- Coordinates: 40°08′22″N 75°04′02″W
- Country: United States
- State: Pennsylvania
- County: Montgomery
- Incorporated: 1916

Government
  - Type: Council-manager
  - Mayor: Kenneth Schauder

Area
  - Total: 1.93 sq mi (5.00 km^{2})
  - Land: 1.93 sq mi (5.00 km^{2})
  - Water: 0 sq mi (0.00 km^{2})
- Elevation: 292 ft (89 m)

Population (2020)
  - Total: 1,272
  - Density: 658.7/sq mi (254.32/km^{2})
- Time zone: UTC-5 (EST)
  - Summer (DST): UTC-4 (EDT)
- ZIP Code: 19009
- Area codes: 215, 267, and 445
- FIPS code: 42-09696
- Website: http://www.brynathynboro.org

Bryn Athyn is a home-rule borough in Montgomery County, Pennsylvania, United States. It was formerly a borough, and its official name remains "Borough of Bryn Athyn". As of the 2020 census, Bryn Athyn had a population of 1,272. It was formed for religious reasons from Moreland Township on February 8, 1916. Bryn Athyn is surrounded by Lower Moreland Township.

"Bryn Athyn" was intended to mean "Hill of Unity" by its founders. "Bryn" is Welsh for "hill"; the source of "athyn" was the 1889 edition William Spurrell's An English-Welsh Pronouncing Dictionary. Spurrell, in turn, apparently got the word from William Owen Pughe, who seems to have coined the term for his Dictionary of the Welsh Language, in which the word is said to mean "tenacious" or "cohesive." It was not attested in print before its inclusion in Pughe's dictionary.

Bryn Athyn is located less than 2 miles (3.2 km) north of Philadelphia.

== Geography ==
According to the U.S. Census Bureau, the borough has a total area of 1.9 square miles (4.9 km^{2}), all land.

== Demographics ==
Historical population
Census	Pop.	Note	%±
1920	392		—
1930	766		95.4%
1940	800		4.4%
1950	913		14.1%
1960	1,057		15.8%
1970	970		−8.2%
1980	947		−2.4%
1990	1,081		14.1%
2000	1,351		25.0%
2010	1,375		1.8%
2020	1,272		−7.5%

As of the 2010 census, Bryn Athyn was 92.5% White, 2.7% Black or African American, 2.5% Asian, 0.1% Native Hawaiian, and 1.8% were two or more races. 1.2% of the population were of Hispanic or Latino ancestry .

As of the census of 2000, there were 1,351 individuals, 377 households, and 292 families residing in the borough. The population density was 706.5 inhabitants per square mile (272.8/km^{2}). There were 381 housing units at an average density of 199.3 per square mile (77.0/km^{2}). The racial makeup of the borough was 96.82% White, 1.04% African American, 0.07% Native American, 1.26% Asian, 0.22% from other races, and 0.59% from two or more races. Hispanic or Latino of any race were 0.67% of the population. 17.9% were of German, 15.5% English, 11.8% American, 6.7% Scottish and 6.6% Swedish ancestry according to Census 2000.

There were 377 households, out of which 41.4% had children under the age of 18 living with them, 71.4% were married couples living together, 4.8% had a female householder with no husband present, and 22.5% were non-families. 19.4% of all households were made up of individuals, and 12.2% had someone living alone who was 65 years of age or older. The average household size was 3.21 and the average family size was 3.76.

In the borough, the population was spread out, with 30.2% under the age of 18, 13.8% from 18 to 24, 22.4% from 25 to 44, 16.7% from 45 to 64, and 17.0% who were 65 years of age or older. The median age was 33 years. For every 100 females there were 94.9 males. For every 100 females age 18 and over, there were 89.0 males.

The median income for a household in the borough was $68,646, and the median income for a family was $76,214. Males had a median income of $48,958 versus $35,000 for females. The per capita income for the borough was $32,737. About 2.4% of families and 3.6% of the population were below the poverty line, including 2.2% of those under age 18 and 4.9% of those age 65 or over.

== Politics and government ==
Presidential elections results
Year	Republican	Democratic
2020	37.5% 300	59.0% 472
2016	37.2% 277	49.1% 365
2012	53.6% 388	41.6% 301
2008	47.5% 353	50.2% 373
2004	59.1% 443	39.0 286
2000	67.5% 442	24.6% 161

Bryn Athyn has a city manager form of government with a mayor (Kenneth Schauder) and borough council. The borough is part of the Fourth Congressional District (represented by Rep. Madeleine Dean), the 152nd State House District (represented by Rep. Nancy Guenst) and the 12th State Senate District (represented by Sen. Maria Collett).

== Points of interest ==
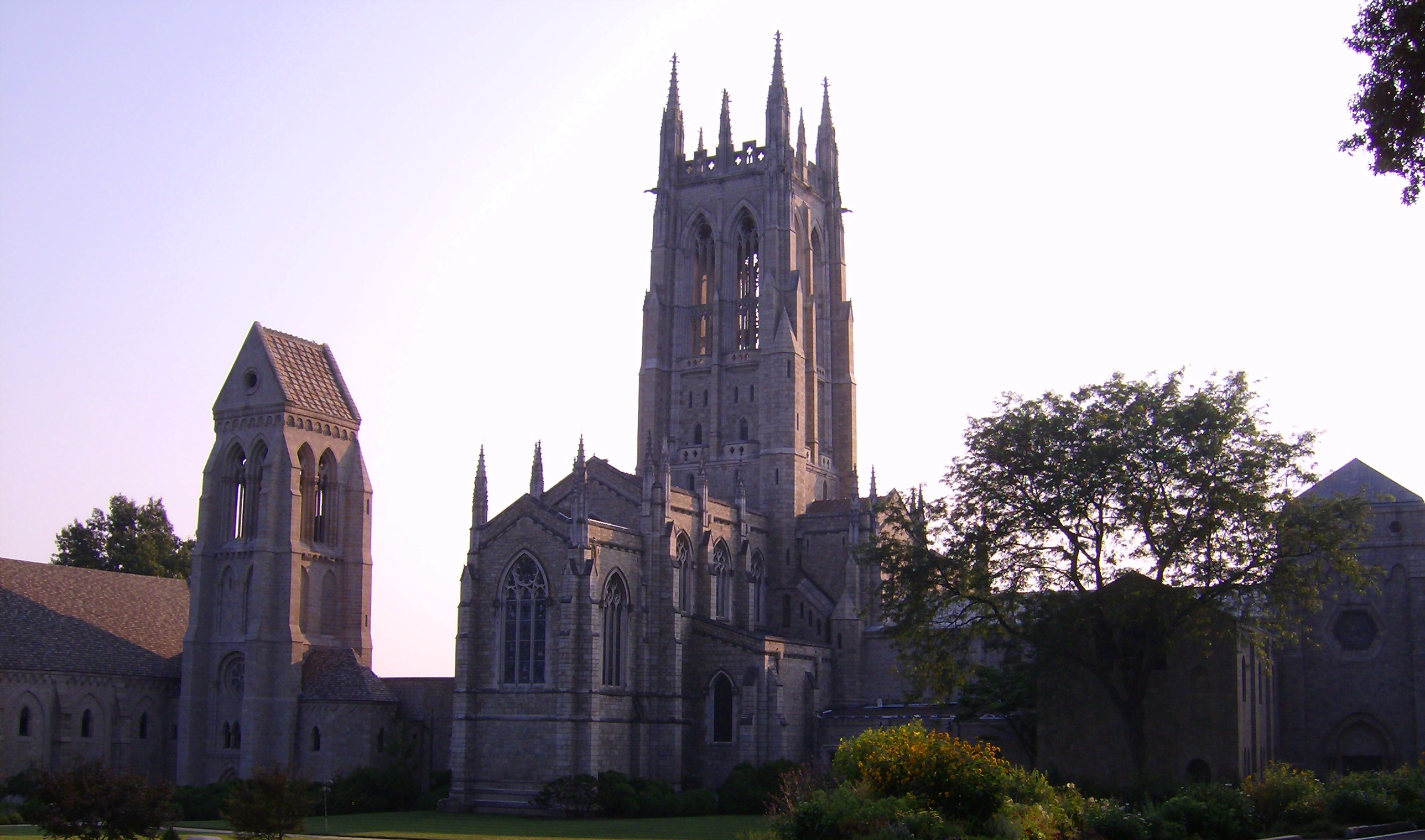
Bryn Athyn Cathedral

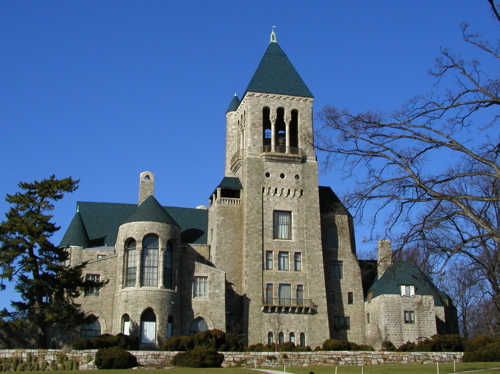
Glencairn Museum

=== Bryn Athyn Historic District ===
The Bryn Athyn Historic District, a National Historic Landmark District, includes four historic buildings:

- Cairnwood Estate was built as a family home for the industrialist John Pitcairn and his wife Gertrude. The building was designed by renowned architectural firm Carrère and Hastings, and the surrounding grounds were designed by Charles Eliot of the landscape design firm Olmsted, Olmsted and Eliot. The building was eventually donated to the Academy of the New Church, and now serves as a special events facility.
- Bryn Athyn Cathedral serves as the episcopal seat of the General Church of the New Jerusalem, an international Swedenborgian church. Bryn Athyn Cathedral, built in the early 20th century, is renowned for its stained glass collection and for its unusual architecture, which follows the arts and crafts tradition. Its construction was financed by John Pitcairn, and supervised by his son, Raymond Pitcairn.
- Glencairn was originally the private residence of millionaire philanthropist Raymond Pitcairn. The castle-like building now serves the Academy of the New Church and Bryn Athyn College as Glencairn Museum, housing a collection of mostly religious artwork and artifacts from around the world and is open to the public.
- Cairncrest was built as a home for John Pitcairn's son, Harold Pitcairn, an aviation pioneer and developer of the autogyro. The building now serves as the central administrative offices for the General Church of the New Jerusalem.

=== Academy of the New Church and Bryn Athyn College ===
Bryn Athyn is also the site of the General Church affiliated Academy of the New Church, which is the parent organization of the Academy of the New Church Secondary Schools, Bryn Athyn College, a divinity school, and the Swedenborg Library (which was named in honor of Emanuel Swedenborg, whose writings constitute the doctrine of the New Church).

== Transportation ==
=== Roads and highways ===
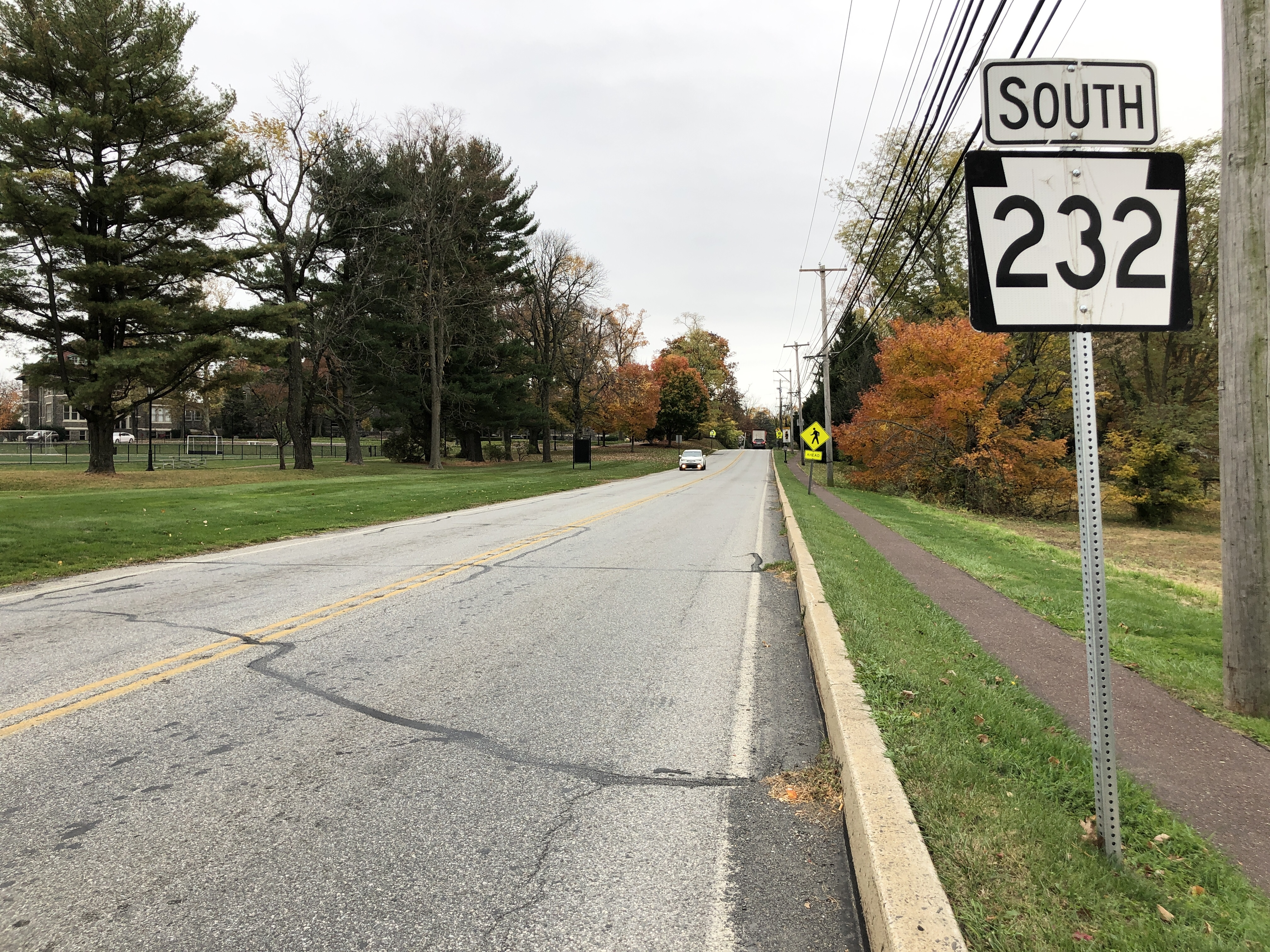
PA 232 southbound in Bryn Athyn

As of 2006 there were 7.86 miles (12.65 km) of public roads in Bryn Athyn, of which 0.87 miles (1.40 km) were maintained by the Pennsylvania Department of Transportation (PennDOT) and 6.99 miles (11.25 km) were maintained by the borough.

The only numbered highway serving Bryn Athyn is Pennsylvania Route 232, which follows Huntingdon Pike on a north-south route through the borough. Byberry Road, the only other road of significance, passes along the northern and northeastern edges of the borough.

=== SEPTA service ===
Bryn Athyn had commuter train service until January 14, 1983. Service was suspended due to failing train equipment resulting in a lack of ridership. As of 2017, the train station is used as the Bryn Athyn post office.

Though rail service was initially replaced with a Fox Chase-Newtown shuttle bus, patronage remained light. The replacement bus service was far slower and less convenient than the train service it replaced, resulting in the shuttle bus being very unpopular. The travelling public never saw a bus service as a suitable replacement for a rail service.

In the ensuing years, there has been interest in resuming passenger service by Bucks County officials. Neighboring Montgomery County officials are supportive of re-thinking the rail corridor as well, though the belief within SEPTA management is that the section through Lorimer Park and Walnut Hill Station (the only sparsely populated section along the railway) will never generate enough riders to be feasible.

In September 2009, the Southampton-based Pennsylvania Transit Expansion Coalition (PA-TEC) began discussions with township officials along the railway, as well as SEPTA officials, about the realistic possibility of resuming even minimal passenger service to relieve traffic congestion in the region. Plans call for completing the electrification to Newtown, as originally planned in the late 1970s. Both Bucks and Montgomery County officials, as well as state representatives, have been receptive to PA-TEC's efforts, despite SEPTA's overall reservations. However, SEPTA has also confirmed that they are indeed open to revisiting the line if there is strong political support in both counties.

All plans for resuming the train service were dropped in 2014 when Montgomery County officials decided to extend the Pennypack Trail over the derelict rail bed.

SEPTA operates the Route 24 bus, a bus that goes from Frankford Transportation Center in Northeast Philadelphia to Southampton. The Route 24 bus goes along Huntingdon Pike while in Bryn Athyn.

=== 1921 wreck ===
On December 5, 1921, two Reading Railroad passenger steam trains collided head-on on a blind curve. The impact sent red-hot coals flying forward from each engine, raining down on the wooden passenger cars of the oncoming train. Twenty-seven people were killed and approximately 70 injured. Most of those killed had burned to death, in part because the wooden cars had burned so quickly and also because of the inability of rescue workers to get access to the trains, which were wedged between the rock walls of a cut through hilly and wooded terrain without road access for fire equipment. The incident led to a ban on the use of wooden rail cars in order to prevent future disasters of a similar nature.

== Public education ==
The Bryn Athyn borough is within the Bryn Athyn School District, which does not operate any public schools. The district website cites the small number of children within the borough enrolled in public schools.

90% of school age children attend private schools within the district and the remainder are homeschooled or attend schools in neighboring districts.

== Notable people ==
- Stephen Gyllenhaal, director and father of Maggie and Jake Gyllenhaal
- Harold Frederick Pitcairn, aviation inventor and pioneer
- Hugo Salinas Price, billionaire and founder of Elektra retail chain in Mexico
