= Raymond Pitcairn =

American politician (1885–1966)

Raymond Pitcairn (1885 – July 12, 1966), son of PPG Industries founder John Pitcairn, was a lawyer, a businessman, a collector of ancient and medieval art, and an amateur architect. He supervised the building of the Bryn Athyn Cathedral, his own castle-mansion of Glencairn, and the "Zeus of the Catskills" Glen Tonche.

Pitcairn was married to Mildred Glenn and they had eight children.

Pitcairn was also quite politically active. A Republican, he served as one of the delegates to Pennsylvania's convention to ratify the Twenty-first Amendment in 1933, and was one of Pennsylvania's delegates to the 1956 Republican National Convention. He was also the national chairman and a major financial supporter of the Sentinels of the Republic, which opposed the expansion of federal regulation and the New Deal.

Pitcairn died on July 12, 1966, and was buried at Bryn Athyn Cemetery, in Bryn Athyn, Pennsylvania.
