= John Pitcairn Jr. =

Scottish-born American industrialist

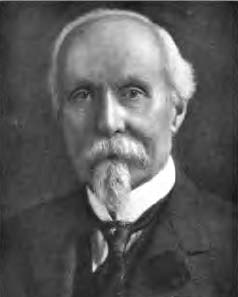
- Born: January 10, 1841; Johnstone, Renfrewshire, Scotland
- Died: July 22, 1916 (aged 75); Bryn Athyn, Pennsylvania, United States
- Occupations: Capitalist, industrialist
- Spouse: Gertrude Starkey
- Children: Vera Pitcairn; Raymond Pitcairn; Theodore Pitcairn; Harold Frederick Pitcairn

Signature
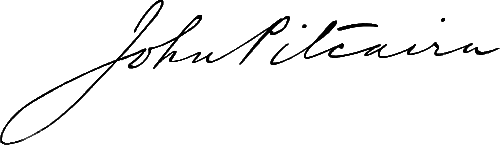

John Pitcairn Jr. (January 10, 1841 – July 22, 1916) was a Scottish-born American industrialist. With just an elementary school education, Pitcairn rose through the ranks of the Pennsylvania railroad industry, and played a significant role in the creation of the modern oil and natural gas industries. He went on to found the Pittsburgh Plate Glass Company (now PPG Industries), an early industry innovator which quickly grew into the largest manufacturer of plate glass in the United States, and amassed one of the largest fortunes in the United States at the time.

Pitcairn was also the primary financial benefactor of the General Church of the New Jerusalem, a Christian church that follows the teachings of Emanuel Swedenborg, and was a major activist in the American anti-vaccination movement.

== Early life ==
Pitcairn was born on January 10, 1841, in Johnstone, Renfrewshire, Scotland, to John Pitcairn Sr. (1803–1884), a machinist, and Agnes McEwan (1803–1891), a housekeeper. He was one of six children resulting from the marriage, and also had one older half-sibling from his father's first marriage.

Pitcairn's parents had initially emigrated to America around 1835, and lived first in Brooklyn, New York, and then in Paterson, New Jersey, where Pitcairn's sister, Janet, was born. Meeting with a lack of financial success, they returned to Scotland a few years later. In 1846, however, the family emigrated again to America, this time with four new children, and settled in Allegheny, Pennsylvania, where Pitcairn's uncle, Alexander Pitcairn, had started a woolens business. There, Pitcairn attended public school until dropping out at age 14 to pursue a career in the railroad.

Around 1849 Pitcairn and the rest of his family were baptized by David Powell, a reverend of the New Church.

== Career ==
=== Rail ===
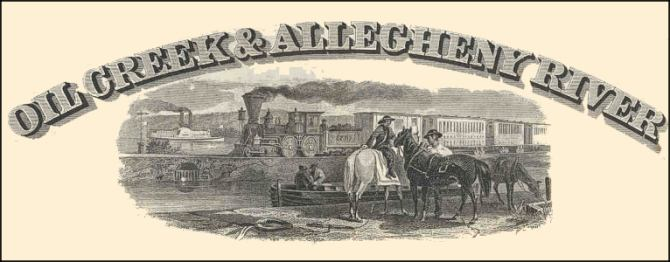
Oil Creek and Allegheny River Railway stock certificate vignette

Pitcairn began his professional life at the age of 14, working as an office boy for the general superintendent of the Pennsylvania Railroad in Altoona. He soon learned telegraphy, and through that became friends with Andrew Carnegie. Pitcairn rapidly worked his way up through the railroad industry; first as assistant to the superintendent of the Pittsburgh, Fort Wayne and Chicago Railroad, and next as assistant to the superintendent of the Philadelphia Division of the Pennsylvania Railroad. On February 22, 1861, during his tenure at the latter, Pitcairn was in charge of the train which carried President-elect Abraham Lincoln from Harrisburg to Philadelphia, en route to the inauguration in Washington, D.C. Later, when the Confederate Army invaded Pennsylvania before the Battle of Antietam, Pitcairn and his brother Robert Pitcairn were dispatched by Colonel Thomas A. Scott, then Assistant Secretary of War, to Chambersburg, to head the train service for the government. Pitcairn next served as assistant superintendent of the Middle Division of the Pennsylvania Railroad, and followed this with a stint as the superintendent of the Middle Division of the Philadelphia and Erie Railroad. Finally, in 1869, he was appointed general manager of the Oil Creek and Allegheny River Railway Company.

=== Energy ===
Upon forming a partnership with J. J. Vandergrift of Pittsburgh and George V. Forman of Buffalo, Pitcairn resigned from his position of general manager to focus exclusively on the oil business. During this period, Pitcairn built the Imperial Refinery at Oil City, Pennsylvania, and was heavily involved with the production, refining, and pipeline transportation of oil. With Vandergrift, he built and controlled the first natural gas pipeline for manufacturing purposes, and had a controlling stake in the Natural Gas Company, Ltd., founded in the summer of 1875, and later to become the Natural Gas Company of West Virginia. Through these and other successful investments in energy, mining, and banking, Pitcairn substantially expanded his wealth.

=== Glass ===
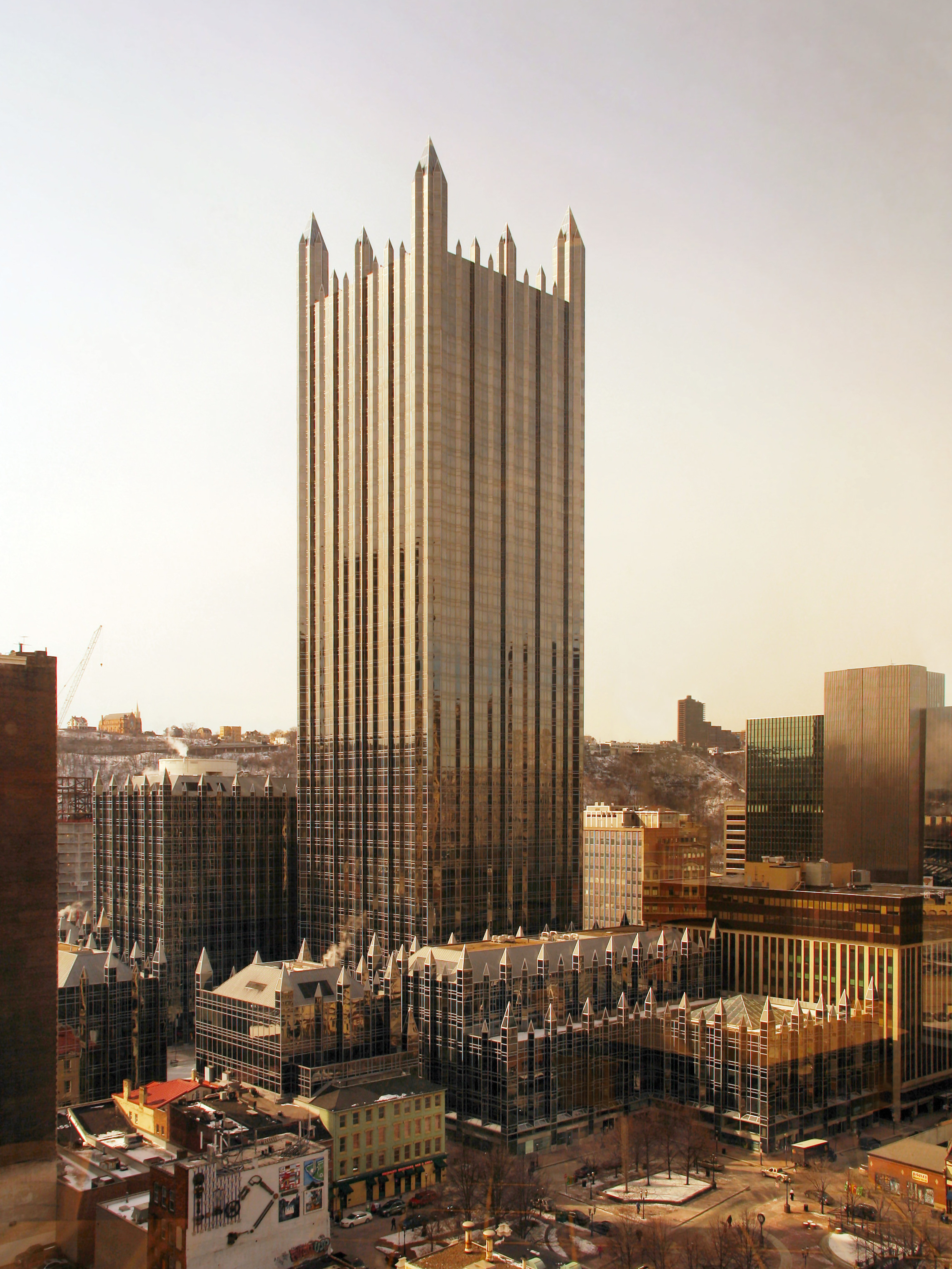
Headquarters of PPG Industries, formerly Pittsburgh Plate Glass Company

In 1883, Pitcairn teamed up with Captain John Baptiste Ford and several others to establish the Pittsburgh Plate Glass Company (PPG). Based in Creighton, Pennsylvania (about 20 miles north of Pittsburgh along the Allegheny River), PPG soon became the United States' first commercially successful producer of high-quality, thick flat glass using the plate process. PPG was also the world's first plate glass plant to power its furnaces with locally produced natural gas, an innovation which rapidly stimulated widespread industrial use of the cleaner-burning fuel.

PPG expanded quickly. By 1900, known as the "Glass Trust", it included ten plants, had a 65 percent share of the U.S. plate glass market, and had become the nation's second largest producer of paint. Today, known as PPG Industries, the company is a multibillion-dollar, Fortune 500 corporation with 150 manufacturing locations around the world. It now produces coatings, glass, fiberglass, and chemicals.

Pitcairn served as a director of PPG from its start, its president from 1897 to 1905, and chairman of the board from 1894 until his death.

=== Magnate ===
Pitcairn's interests and holdings were not limited to PPG; at the time of his death, he was also president of the C. H. Wheeler Manufacturing Company, the Pittsburgh Valve and Fittings Company, and the Loyal Hanna Coal and Coke Company, and a director of the Central National Bank of Philadelphia, the Columbia Chemical Company, the Michigan Chemical Company, the Natural Gas Company of West Virginia, and the Owosso Sugar Company.

== Family ==
Pitcairn was the brother of Pennsylvania railroad magnate Robert Pitcairn and consul-general Hugh Pitcairn.

In 1877, the already highly successful, 38-year-old Pitcairn met 21-year-old Gertrude Starkey (1855–1898). Two years later, he proposed marriage, but was gently turned down. Reputedly, Starkey's strong New Church beliefs about the ideal of marriage required her to conduct a close examination of the spiritual nature of her feelings for him. Undeterred by her rejection, Pitcairn continued to court Starkey for five more years. Finally she accepted, and they were married in 1884.

Following their marriage, the couple lived on Spring Garden Street in Philadelphia, until the completion of the new family estate, Cairnwood, in 1895. Together they had six children, only four of whom survived infancy. These were:

- Vera Pitcairn (1887–1910). Vera died suddenly of appendicitis at the age of 23.
- Raymond Pitcairn (1885–1966). Raymond was a lawyer, a businessman, a collector of ancient and medieval art, and an amateur architect. He supervised the building of the Bryn Athyn Cathedral. He was also the national chairman and a major financial supporter of the Sentinels of the Republic, a right-wing political group of the 1920s and 1930s which opposed child labor legislation and the New Deal.
- Theodore Pitcairn (1893–1973). Theodore was an arts collector and philanthropist, and a minister in the General Church of the New Jerusalem. In the late 1930s a doctrinal schism within the church led him and several other members to found another "New Church" branch known as The Lord's New Church Which Is Nova Hierosolyma. He served as a leader of this new church until his death.
- Harold Frederick Pitcairn (1897–1960). Harold, a lifelong aviation enthusiast, started Pitcairn Aviation, an air mail service that ultimately grew into Eastern Airlines. He founded the Pitcairn Aircraft Company, which designed and built under license pioneering airmail aircraft and autogyros. He played a key role in promoting rotary wing flight leading to development of the helicopter.

== Religious philanthropy ==
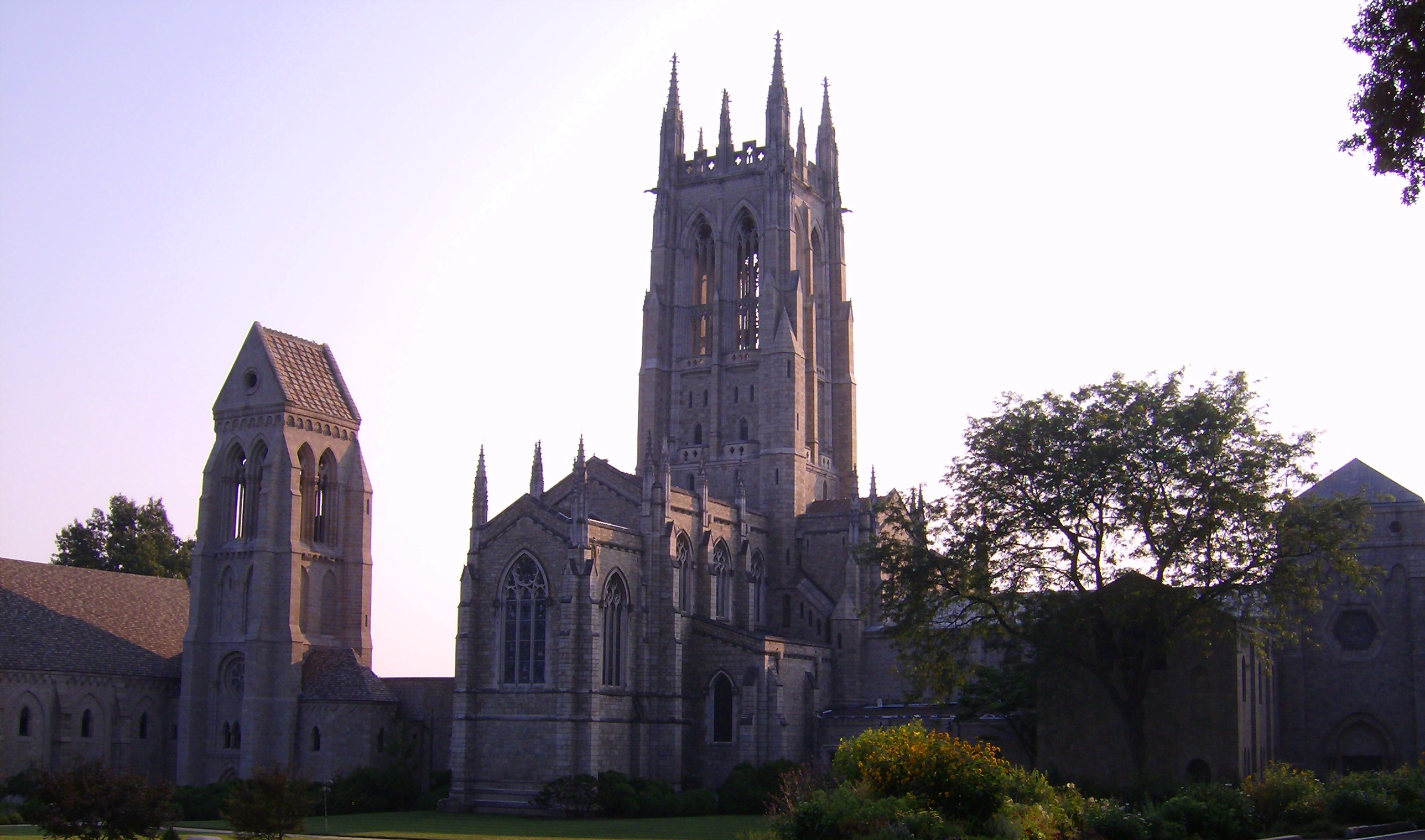
Bryn Athyn Cathedral

Pitcairn was an active member and benefactor of the General Church of the New Jerusalem, a branch of the New Church, which follows the teachings of Emanuel Swedenborg. Pitcairn's financial largess enabled the founding of the Swedenborgian settlement at Bryn Athyn, Pennsylvania, the construction of the town's library, and the New Church's Bryn Athyn Cathedral. He also financed the construction of a new campus for the Academy of the New Church, a Swedenborgian learning center comprising a secondary school, a college, and a theological school. The campus was completed in 1911.

== Anti-vaccination activism ==
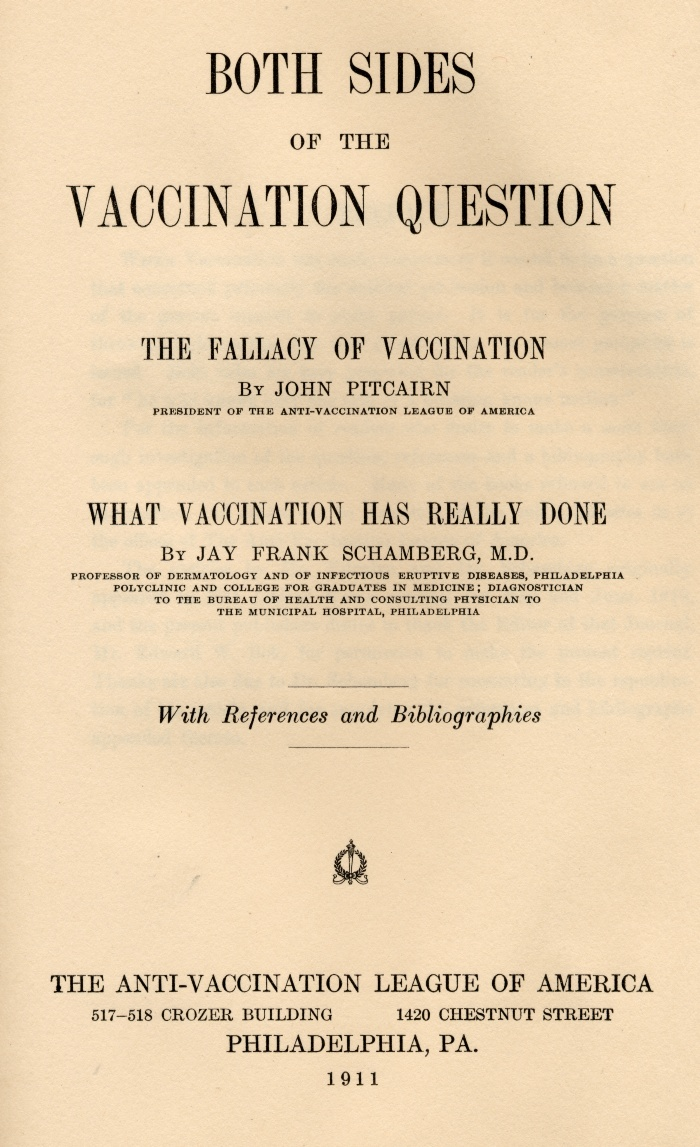
"The Fallacy of Vaccination" by John Pitcairn

During the last ten years of his life, Pitcairn was highly active in the American anti-vaccination movement. According to public health historian James Colgrove, Pitcairn's opposition to vaccination stemmed from Swedenborgian teachings, a devotion to homeopathy, an alternative medical practice embraced by many New Church members, and his son Raymond's adverse reaction to a vaccination.

On March 5, 1907, in Harrisburg, Pennsylvania, he delivered an address to the Committee on Public Health and Sanitation of the Pennsylvania General Assembly criticizing vaccination.

He later sponsored the National Anti-Vaccination Conference, held in Philadelphia in October 1908, which led to the creation of the Anti-Vaccination League of America. When the league was organized later that month, Pitcairn was chosen to be its first president.

In May 1910, an article by Pitcairn entitled "The Fallacy of Vaccination" was published in the Ladies Home Journal, a periodical with a readership of several million.

On December 1, 1911, he was appointed by Pennsylvania Governor John K. Tener to the Pennsylvania State Vaccination Commission, which in accordance with the law mandating it, was to include as members two anti-vaccinationists as well as two pro-vaccinationists. Pitcairn subsequently authored a detailed report strongly opposing the commission's pro-vaccination conclusions.

== Later life and death ==
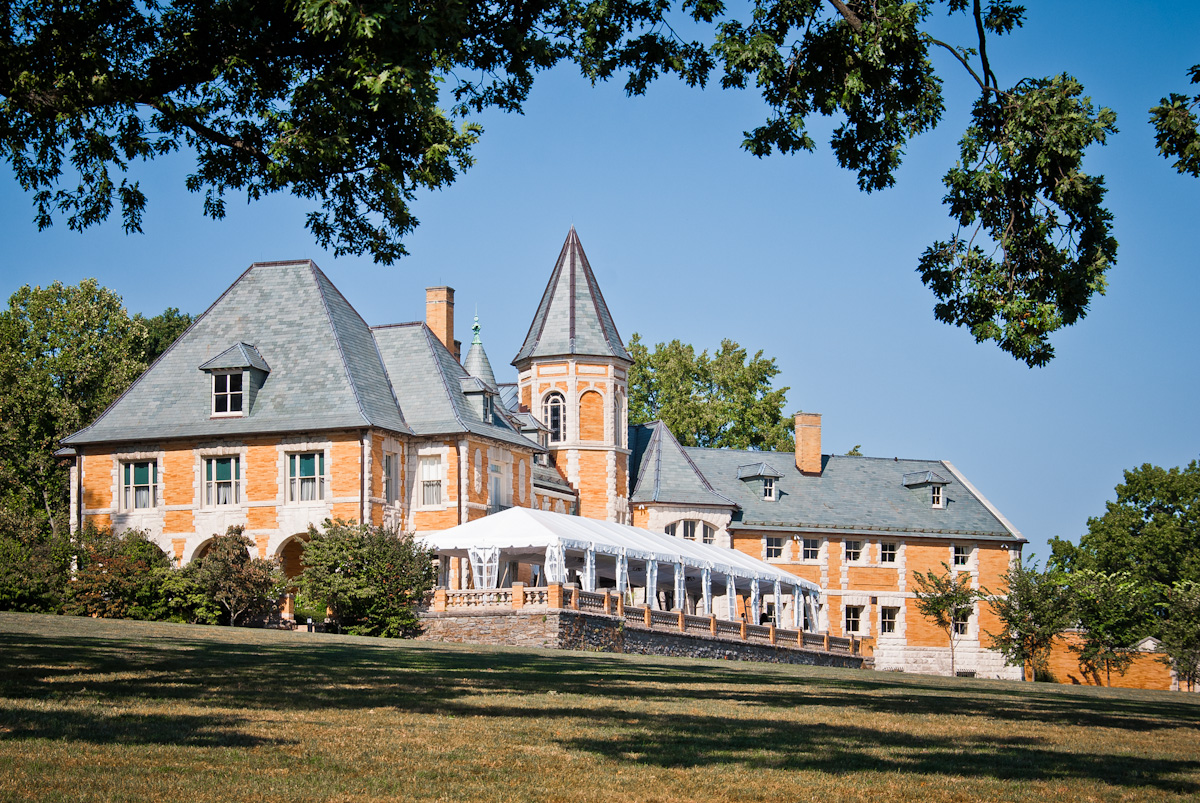
Cairnwood Mansion

Construction of Pitcairn's family estate, Cairnwood, was completed in 1895. His wife, Gertrude, died just a few years later, in 1898. Pitcairn never remarried. When asked why, he once responded, "I would no sooner remarry than if Gertrude were standing in the other room."

Pitcairn remained quite active in his numerous business, philanthropy, and social activism capacities well into his seventies. Finally, in the fall of 1915, he suffered a bout of pneumonia, from which he never fully recovered. He died at Cairnwood on July 22, 1916.

In 2002, Cairnwood was entered onto the National Register of Historic Places.
