= Swedenborgian Church =

Swedenborgian Church may refer to:

== Denominations ==
- The New Church (Swedenborgian), general term for Swedenborgian denominations
- Swedenborgian Church of North America, also known as the General Convention of the New Jerusalem
- General Church of the New Jerusalem, also known as the General Church
- Lord's New Church Which Is Nova Hierosolyma, also known as the Lord's New Church

== Structures ==
- Swedenborgian Church (San Francisco, California), listed on the U.S. National Register of Historic Places
