= Academy of the New Church Secondary Schools =

Location
- 2815 Huntingdon Pike; Bryn Athyn, Pennsylvania 19009

Information
- Religious affiliation: Christianity
- Denomination: The New Church (Swedenborgian)
- Established: 1876
- CEEB code: 390475 (Boys); 390476 (Girls)
- Principal: Erica Stine (Girls), Dr. Jeremy Irwin (Boys)
- Head of school: Jim Adams
- Chaplain: Rev. Barry Halterman
- Grades: 9–12
- Enrollment: 250
- Campus type: Large suburb
- Colors: Cardinal and White
- Athletics conference: Friends Schools League
- Nickname: Lions
- Accreditation: Middle States Association
- Annual tuition
- Website: ancss.org

The Academy of the New Church, Secondary Schools is an accredited, private, 9th through 12th-grade Girls School and Boys School, located in Bryn Athyn, Pennsylvania, United States. The school is affiliated with the General Church of New Jerusalem's educational arm, the Academy of the New Church, along with the Bryn Athyn College of the New Church, the Academy of the New Church Theological School and others. It was established in 1876.

== History ==
Its primary goal was to prepare men for the priesthood of the New Church. Following the establishment of the Theological School and a collegiate department, later to become Bryn Athyn College, the Boys School opened in 1881. In 1884, a girls' school, privately set up by Sarah DeCharms Hibbard, merged with the Academy.

At the start of the 20th century, the schools relocated to what was then the countryside near Philadelphia, in Montgomery County. Funding from PPG Industries founder John Pitcairn enabled the construction of the new campus. Later, in the 1960s, the college moved to a separate, adjacent campus.

== Notable alumni ==
- Rakeem Christmas – Power forward (basketball) at Syracuse University and Indiana Pacers
- John Rienstra - Guard (American football) at Pittsburgh Steelers (1986-1990) and Cleveland Browns (1991-1992)
- Marcus Gilbert - Small forward at Fairfield University
- Hugo Salinas Price - Mexican businessperson
