= Theodore Pitcairn =

American clergyman, theologian, and philanthropist

- Born: November 5, 1893; Philadelphia, Pennsylvania, U.S.
- Died: December 17, 1973 (aged 80); Bryn Athyn, Pennsylvania, U.S.
- Occupations: Clergyman, Philanthropist, Art Connoisseur
- Spouse: Marijke Urban
- Parent(s): John Pitcairn Jr. and Gertrude Starkey

Theodore Pitcairn (November 5, 1893 – December 17, 1973), the son of PPG Industries founder John Pitcairn, was a clergyman, theologian, philanthropist, and connoisseur of the arts and antiquities.

== Early life and education ==
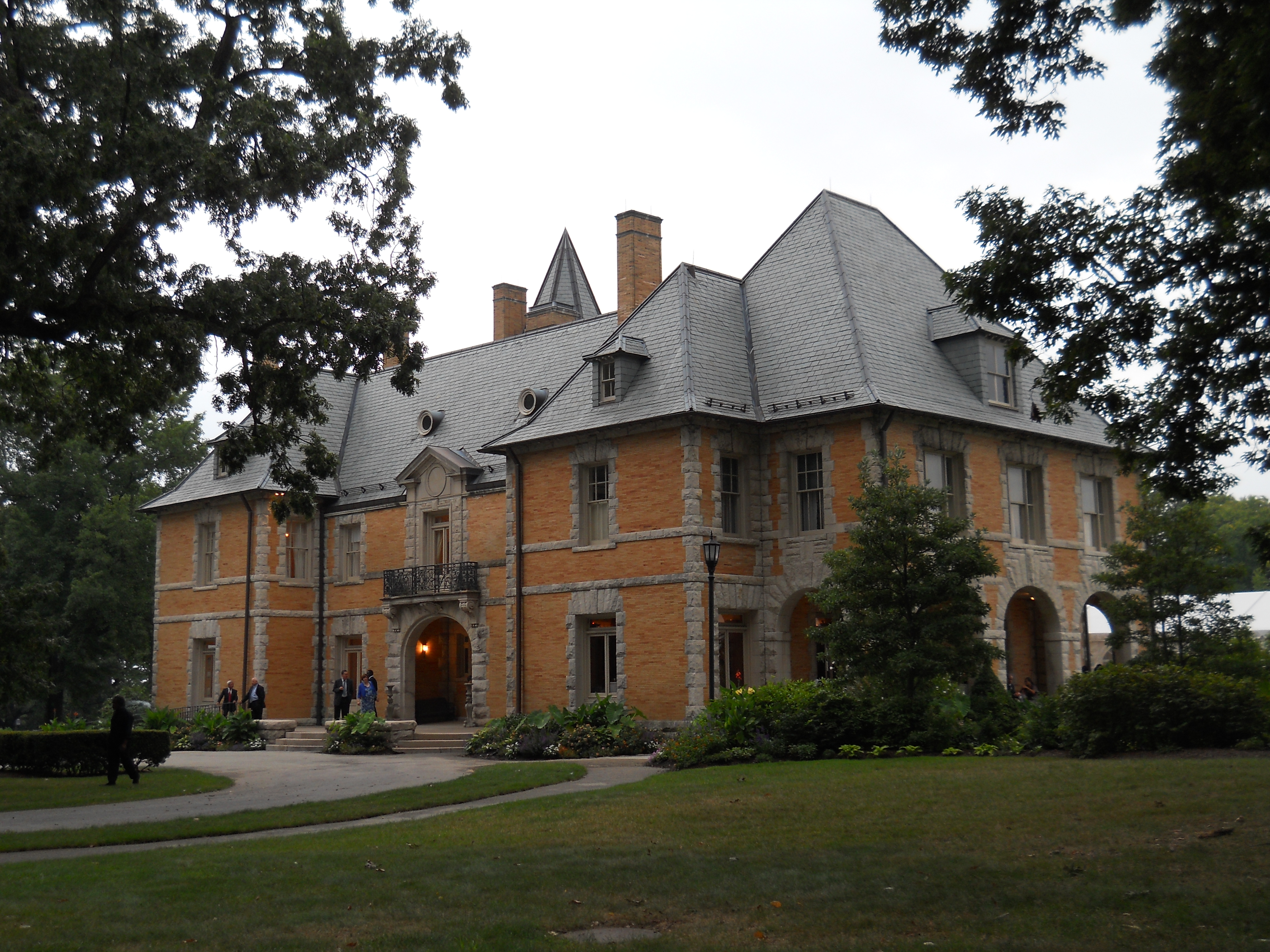
Cairnwood, Pitcairn's boyhood home

Born in Philadelphia, Pennsylvania, on November 5, 1893, he was the fourth son and fifth child of John and Gertrude Pitcairn.The family moved from Philadelphia to their newly built home, Cairnwood, in Huntingdon Valley in 1895. Pitcairn spent his early school years in the Bryn Athyn parish schools of the General Church of the New Jerusalem, which follows the teachings of Emanuel Swedenborg. He received his high school diploma from the Academy of the New Church Boys College in 1913. After attending the University of Pennsylvania, Pitcairn made the decision to study at the Academy of the New Church Theological School. He graduated in June 1918 with a Bachelor of Theology degree.

== Early career ==
Ordained into the priesthood of the General Church in 1917, Pitcairn worked with the church missions and taught theology to African students in South Africa and Lesotho (then known as Basutoland). He served as Pastor of the Durban Society in Natal, South Africa, and later as Assistant Pastor of the Bryn Athyn Church. During this time, he also served as Acting Pastor for several circles in France, Seine-et-Marne, Thoury-Ferottes, and Les Pleignes. Pitcairn taught art history, history of education, and a course on the "Human Organic" at the Academy College.

== Establishment of a new church ==
In the late 1930s, doctrinal differences within the General Church led Pitcairn and several other church members to found a new branch of the New Church known as The Lord's New Church Which Is Nova Hierosolyma. In 1939, Pitcairn established a non-profit corporation for the purposes of promoting and maintaining the new church. He served as pastor of the Philadelphia Society of The Lord's New Church until 1960, when leadership of the church passed to Philip N. Odhner.

== Author ==
Pitcairn wrote several doctrinal works, including The Book Sealed with Seven Seals (1927); The Seven Days of Creation (1930); and My Lord and My God: Essays on Modern Religion, the Bible and Emanuel Swedenborg (1967). In 1969 the church published The Beginning and Development of Doctrine in the New Church by Theodore Pitcairn, bound together with Notes on the Development of Doctrine in the Church by Philip N. Odhner.

== Art collector ==
Over the years, Pitcairn traveled extensively in Europe, where he further developed his keen interest in fine art. He acquired paintings by El Greco, Claude Monet, Rembrandt, and Vincent van Gogh. Thomas Hoving, former Director of the Metropolitan Museum of Art, described meeting the Reverend Pitcairn in the course of negotiating the purchase of Garden at Sainte-Adresse by Claude Monet.

In 1921, while searching for a suitable portrait painter for church dignitaries—Bishop William Frederic Pendleton and Bishop Nathaniel Dandridge Pendleton—Pitcairn met Philippe Smit through the efforts of Ernst Pfeiffer at the home of the banker and art collector Nicolaas Urban. Impressed by Smit's style, Pitcairn purchased Marijke with White Feather Fan, a portrait of Urban's daughter. He subsequently met Marijke, the subject of the painting, and they were married in 1926. Theodore and Marijke (September 7, 1905 - November 10, 1978) were the parents of nine children. Marijke's mother, Berendina, married Philippe Smit in 1941 after her divorce from Nicolaas Urban (1929). Throughout the painter's life until his death in 1948 and even after that, Pitcairn acquired the majority of the artist's works.

== Patron of the arts ==
Pitcairn's love of antiquities is evident in the art studio he built for Smit on the grounds of his estate in Bryn Athyn. Designed by famed Philadelphia architect George Howe, of Mellor Meigs & Howe, the building incorporates 12th century French stone columns and an Italian stone-carved fireplace. The heavy wooden doors are embellished with ironwork by the metalworker, Samuel Yellin. The studio now serves as the Chapel of The Lord's New Church. Many of Smit's paintings were hung in the chapel and in the Pitcairns' colonial-era home in Bryn Athyn, Pennsylvania.

Pitcairn was a major benefactor of the Philadelphia Orchestra during the time Eugene Ormandy served as conductor.. Over a period of five years, he commissioned works for the orchestra from such composers as Richard Yardumian

== Death ==
Pitcairn died at his home in Bryn Athyn, Pennsylvania on December 17, 1973. His wife, Marijke, died five years later, in 1978.
