= The Right Reverend =

Religious honorific style

The Right Reverend (abbreviated as The Rt Revd or The Rt Rev) is an honorific style given to certain (primarily Western) Christian ministers and members of clergy. It is a variant of the more common style "The Reverend".

== Usage ==
- In the Anglican Communion and the Catholic Church in Great Britain, it applies to bishops, except that The Most Reverend is used for archbishops (elsewhere, all Catholic bishops are styled as The Most Reverend).
- In some churches with a Presbyterian heritage, it applies to the current Moderator of the General Assembly, such as
  - the current Moderator of the United Church of Canada (if the moderator is an ordained minister; laypeople may be elected moderator, but are not styled Right Reverend)
  - the current Moderator of the Presbyterian Church in Ireland
  - the current Moderator of the General Assembly of the Church of Scotland
  - the current Moderator of the Presbyterian Church of East Africa
  - the current Moderator of Presbyterian Church of Ghana
  - the current Moderator of the Evangelical Presbyterian Church, Ghana
  - the current Moderator of the Sutlej Reformed Church of Pakistan
- In the Catholic Church, it applies to abbots of monasteries in the Latin Church and archimandrites in the Eastern Catholic Churches. Monsignors of the ranks of protonotary apostolic and domestic prelate were formerly styled The Right Reverend Monsignor, but the currently correct style for them is The Reverend Monsignor.
- In the Eastern Orthodox tradition, bishops and titular bishops are styled "The Right Reverend".
- In Methodism, as in the Anglican tradition, the style is also applied to bishops of the African Methodist Episcopal Church and the African Methodist Episcopal Zion Church. Other Methodist denominations, including the United Methodist Church, only use this to refer to district superintendents, not their bishops.
- It is used as a title for bishops in the Church of God in Christ, a Holiness–Pentecostal Christian denomination.
- In the General Church of the New Jerusalem the title is used for all bishops who have been ordained into the third or ecclesiastical degree of the priesthood.

== See also ==
- The Very Reverend
