= Philippe Smit =

Dutch painter active in France

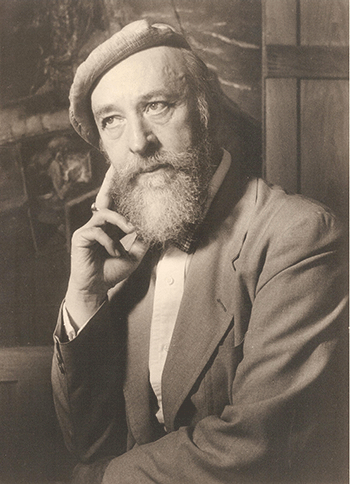
- Philippe Smit
- Born: Philippe Smit; November 17, 1886; Zwolle, Netherlands
- Died: April 5, 1948 (aged 61); Thoury-Férottes, France
- Known for: Pastels, portraits, landscapes
- Movement: Symbolism, Impressionism

Philippe Smit (17 November 1886 – 5 July 1948) was a Dutch painter active primarily in France and the Netherlands. He was born in Zwolle, Netherlands, and died in Thoury-Férottes, France. His technically refined work, often described as lyrical or spiritual, remained largely unknown to the general public, although it has been praised by art critics and private collectors.

== Biography ==
Philippe Smit was born in Zwolle into a Franco-Dutch family. In 1895, his family moved to Paris, where he received a French education. Early on, he developed a passion for Symbolist poetry (Verlaine, Baudelaire, Mallarmé, Rollinat) and the music of Claude Debussy, both of which would deeply influence his artistic sensibility.

Caught in the Netherlands at the outbreak of World War I, he stayed there until 1920, hosted by patrons Nicolaas and Berendina Urban. In 1921, he met the American collector Theodore Pitcairn, who became his primary patron. Invited by Pitcairn, Smit made several extended visits to the United States, notably in 1924, where he painted portraits for the Church of the New Jerusalem (Swedenborgian).

In 1940, Smit married Berendina Urban, who had divorced in 1929. From the 1930s, they lived at the Château de La Motte in Thoury-Ferrottes (Seine-et-Marne), where Smit continued working until his death in 1948.

== Work ==
Philippe Smit developed an eclectic and highly personal style, often described as “impressionist realism” or “mystical symbolism.” He was influenced by Jean-François Millet, Impressionists like Monet and Van Gogh, as well as by Odilon Redon. According to a 2017 article in Fine Art Connoisseur, Smit favored pastel, which he handled with “rich and intense colour,” and produced works imbued with spiritual overtones.

His art reflects an inner search shaped by poetry, music, and the writings of Emanuel Swedenborg. He painted portraits, still lifes, and landscapes, especially of the Seine and the Forest of Fontainebleau. Remaining outside the major artistic movements of his time, Smit received limited recognition during his lifetime.

== Exhibitions and critical reception ==
Smit’s first public exhibition took place in 1916 at the Larensche Kunsthandel in Amsterdam, featuring 38 works. Art critic Anton Zelling praised the poetic and spiritual qualities of his pastels in De Hofstad, writing that Smit’s works "unite music, poetry, and religion."

In 1920, the Kunsthandel De Hem in Laren hosted his second solo exhibition, where critic Kasper Niehaus highlighted his technical skill and his ability to elevate natural forms without compromising realism. In Het Getij (1922), Niehaus described Smit as a rare talent, "still too little known."

In 1923, a solo exhibition was held at Atelier De Sparren in Laren. This marked the peak of his visibility in the Netherlands, culminating in a group exhibition organized by art dealer Jacques Goudstikker in Amsterdam in 1933.

In February 1948, shortly before his death, Smit exhibited for the first time in France at the Galerie Pierre Maures in Paris. More than thirty works were presented.

Posthumous exhibitions followed in the United States, including a major retrospective in 1957 at the Michele and Donald D’Amour Museum of Fine Arts in Springfield, organized by Theodore Pitcairn. His collection was also shown at the Philadelphia Museum of Art in 1960. From 10 February to 10 May 2026, the Musée d'Orsay presented the three recently acquired pastels as part of an exhibition display entitled Northern Light: Scandinavian and Dutch Drawings from the Musée d'Orsay.

== Legacy ==
Most of Philippe Smit’s works remain in private collections. A significant number are held by The Lord’s New Church in the United States.

His work is also part of the permanent collections of several public institutions:

- Musée d’Orsay, Paris: Clair de lune, Maartensdijk (1916), Bouquet de fleurs des champs (c. 1913), and Jeune fille dans un lit (c. 1913), all acquired in 2024.
- Musée des impressionnismes Giverny, France (Scene in the Park, before 1915)
- Singer Laren Museum, Netherlands (Willlows, 1917)
- Michele and Donald D’Amour Museum of Fine Arts, Springfield, USA (L’Innocent, 1920)
- Glencairn Museum, Bryn Athyn, USA
