= New Church Education =

New Church Education is a philosophy of education developed and practiced by the General Church of the New Jerusalem, a denomination of The New Church (Swedenborgian). This philosophy is based on some of works of Emanuel Swedenborg, whose theological writings are considered by members of this church to be the revealed Word of God, equal in authority to the Old Testament and the New Testament.

Early in its history, the General Church of the New Jerusalem adopted distinctiveness as one of its central principles. Its members worked to clearly identify those things found in Swedenborg's theological writings that differentiated the New Church, as described there, from other churches and then to incorporate those distinctions into their institutions and actions.

Developing a distinctive theory and practice of education became important as compulsory education spread across the United States. Looking into their revelation, members of the General Church of the New Jerusalem pieced together a new idea of how a child's mind develops from birth into adulthood. This developmental process formed the basis of a distinctive educational philosophy designed to give children in formal educational settings the experiences and knowledge believed to provide a solid foundation for the lifelong process of spiritual regeneration and growth.

== Overview ==
The main purpose of New Church education is to help students learn, love, and live the teachings of the Jesus Christ as revealed in the Old and New Testaments and the Heavenly Doctrines of the New Jerusalem. Based on Emanuel Swedenborg's views on child development, New Church Education provides for the spiritual development of each student, focusing on the essential areas described in the Ten Religious Goals of New Church Education.

== Key Ideas ==
=== The State of the Human Mind at Birth ===
According to the New Church, everyone is born with inherited tendencies to do evil. Unlike the doctrine of original sin, however, Swedenborgians believe that children only inherit the tendencies to commit the same sins as their ancestors and not the sins themselves. According to New Church doctrine, while a newborn's will is considered inherently flawed and self-centered, they are not guilty of sin due to their innocence.

The implication is that without appropriate education in childhood, children will develop tendencies towards harmful decision-making and attitude. These behaviors will be considered sinful once the child becomes an adult and is deemed responsible for their own actions. New Church education emphasizes critical thinking, viewing the world from a spiritual perspective, to understanding the difference between right and wrong, and developing positive spiritual habits.

=== Childhood Innocence ===
One of the primary goals of New Church education is to maintain the state of innocence associated with childhood for as long as possible. The New Church's concept of innocence refers to a state of mind that is free from sin due to a willingness to be led by the Lord. One can be quite knowledgeable about the world and still be willing to be led. Specifically, childhood is a time of "innocence of ignorance," that is, children are free from sin because they do not yet fully understand the difference between good and evil and cannot accurately see the future consequence of their choices. Even though children do things that would be considered evil and sinful if done by an adult, they are not yet held accountable because they cannot yet knowingly commit sin—not fully understanding what sin is.

Because children are innocent and thus willing to be led, they are most open to learning the difference between right and wrong and practicing that understanding into lifelong habits. New Church education, then, intends to provide formal instruction in academic subjects in a way that also explains, demonstrates, and provides and opportunity to practice those differences between right and wrong.

=== School as Extension of the Home ===
Proponents of New Church Education believe that consistent messages from home, church, and school—three of the most influentional institutions in a child's life—as to what constitutes good and evil is the most effective way to reduce the impact of conflicting messages from other sources. This consistency of message is to support the establishment of good habits that provide a solid foundation for the work of regeneration in adulthood, when the innocence of ignorance necessarily fades into spiritual struggles to do what is good and shun what is evil.

The school is said to "extend" the home because the values taught at school and upon which the school is founded should duplicate the values held and taught by the families who send their children to become students. Schools should not impose values on the home, but should reinforce the values taught at home.

=== The Ten Religious Goals ===
New Church Educational philosophy is organized around the following 10 topics. Each topic is associated with a religious goal for the educational environment based on a passage from the Writings for the New Church:

The Lord Jesus Christ
To assist students in building an ongoing and developmentally appropriate affection and understanding of who the Lord Jesus Christ is in their own lives.

"[A]n acknowledgment of God produces a conjunction of God with a person and of the person with God."Divine Providence 325

The Lord's Word
To foster in students an affection for, a knowledge of, and a belief in, the Lord's Word and an ability to read it with understanding and delight.

"The Word must be taught mediately through parents, teachers, books and especially through the reading of it. Nevertheless, it is not taught by these, but by the Lord through them." Divine Providence 172.6

Heaven and Hell
To foster in students a delight in and a knowledge of the reality of the spiritual world and its divisions.

"That there is a hell and a heaven, and that the life after death is eternal." Arcana Caelestia 5135.3

Marriage
To foster in students an affection for and a knowledge of true marriage.

"[I]nternal conjunction, which is that of souls and constitutes marriage itself, can be provided on earth...in the case of those who from early youth had loved and desired and asked of the Lord a legitimate and lovely companionship with one." Married Love 49

Charity
To foster in students a developing knowledge of how to live a life of charity and morality and to give them opportunities to practice it.

"These truths, that relate to charity toward the neighbor and to love to the Lord, must be learned before it is possible for a person to be regenerated. They are first implanted through parents and teachers; next from the Word of the Lord: and afterwards through the person's own reflection of them." Arcana Caelestia 2831.1

"Everyone learns from parents and teachers to live morally...and as he grows in years, to add a rational appreciation to these and so to perfect his moral character." True Christian Religion 443

Worship
To foster in students an affection for and a knowledge of the important role public and private worship play in their lives.

"The first commandment is 'You shall worship the Lord your God.'" Arcana Caelestia 1798.3

Prayer
To foster in students an understanding and delight in the forms and uses of prayer.

"[T]hat they ought to pray daily and this with humility." Arcana Caelestia 5135: 3

The Church
To foster in students a knowledge of the church and its role in their lives, and an understanding and appreciation for those of the universal church.

"The Lord's Church is diffused through the whole world, but its inmost is where the Lord is known and acknowledged, and where the Word is." Apocalypse Explained 313: 3

Spreading the Good News
To foster in students a desire and an ability to spread the Lord's Word.

"[F]or what is the use of knowing, unless what is known to one be also known to others?" Influx 18

Trust in Providence
To foster in students a sense of their place in the stream of Providence and an awareness of the Lord's continual provision of their needs.

"Peace has confidence in the Lord in it, that He directs all things, and provides all things and that He leads to a good end." Arcana Caelestia 8455

== History ==
New Church people in Great Britain started the first schools to offer education which looked to the Lord in the Old Testament, the New Testament, and the Heavenly Doctrine. Some of these were day schools and others were a variation of Sunday School but they all gave children instruction in reading, writing and arithmetic as well as religion. During the 1800s over thirty day schools were operating in England, offering a basic education but most of these closed in the early 1900s. Yet even as these schools were closing, there was a rededication to New Church education among those sympathetic with the goals of the Academy of the New Church. Schools opened in London and Colchester which continued to offer education in the light of New Church teachings for many years. Why did they carry on with New Church education? The answer lies in what was happening in the United States and Canada.

As New Church ideas spread to North America, many congregations in the United States and in Canada started day schools as well as Sunday Schools. But as the quality of public education improved and it became more accessible, most congregations decided to focus on their Sunday School programs as a way to teach children about the Lord and His Word. There were others who felt strongly about the importance of New Church education in the home, in school, and on Sundays. They felt that one of the most effective ways to help the church was to give children their academic education in the light of New Church teachings. They wanted children to hear or read stories from the Lord’s Word each day and have a supportive environment to help them apply these teachings in their lives. Those believing that New Church education plays an essential role in the life of the church rallied around the Academy of the New Church when it was established in 1876. Many congregations opened elementary schools in support of Academy ideals. These schools are affiliated with the General Church of the New Jerusalem, which works closely with the Academy.

The Academy has been a center for New Church education since its founding in 1876, looking to the Lord in the light of the Old Testament, the New Testament, and the Heavenly Doctrine. It is composed of four private, accredited schools located in Bryn Athyn, Pennsylvania, near Philadelphia. The Academy offers education for high school and college students as well as those wanting a post-graduate degree in New Church theology.

== New Church Schools ==
=== New Church Preschools ===
==== South Africa ====
- Impaphala New Church Preschool, Eshowe, Natal, RSA
- Kainon Pre-primary School, Westville, Natal, RSA
- The New Church Preschool of the Diepkloof Society, Diepkloof, Gauteng, RSA

==== United States ====
- Bryn Athyn Church Preschool, Bryn Athyn, Pennsylvania, USA
- Glenview New Church Preschool, Glenview, IL

=== New Church Elementary Schools (students age 5-14) ===
==== Canada ====
- Olivet School, Toronto, ON
- Carmel New Church School, Kitchener, ON

==== Ghana ====
- New Church Preparatory School, Asakraka
- New Church School Tema, Tema

==== Kenya ====
- Etora New Church School, Ogembo

==== South Africa ====
- Kainon New Church School, Durbin

==== United States ====
- Pittsburgh New Church School, Pittsburgh, PA
- Bryn Athyn Church School, Bryn Athyn, PA
- Kempton New Church School, Kempton, PA
- Oak Arbor School, Rochester, MI
- Glenview New Church Schools, Glenview, IL
- Washington New Church School, Mitchellville, MD

=== New Church Secondary Schools (students age 15-18) ===
- The Academy of the New Church Boys School, Bryn Athyn, PA, USA
- The Academy of the New Church Girls School, Bryn Athyn, PA, USA
- The Midwestern Academy, Glenview, IL
- Carmel New Church Secondary School, Caryndale, Ontario, Canada
- Washington New Church School, Mitchellville, MD, USA

=== New Church Higher Education ===
- Bryn Athyn College, Bryn Athyn, PA, USA
- The Academy of the New Church Theological School, Bryn Athyn, PA, USA
- Korea New Church Theological School, Korea
- New Jerusalem Theological Institute, Abidjan, Côte d'Ivoire
- South African Theological School, Durbin, RSA

=== Other New Church Educational Institutions ===
- British Academy Summer School
