= Colchester New Church =

Church in Colchester, England

Coordinates: 51°52′55.05″N 0°52′57.39″E

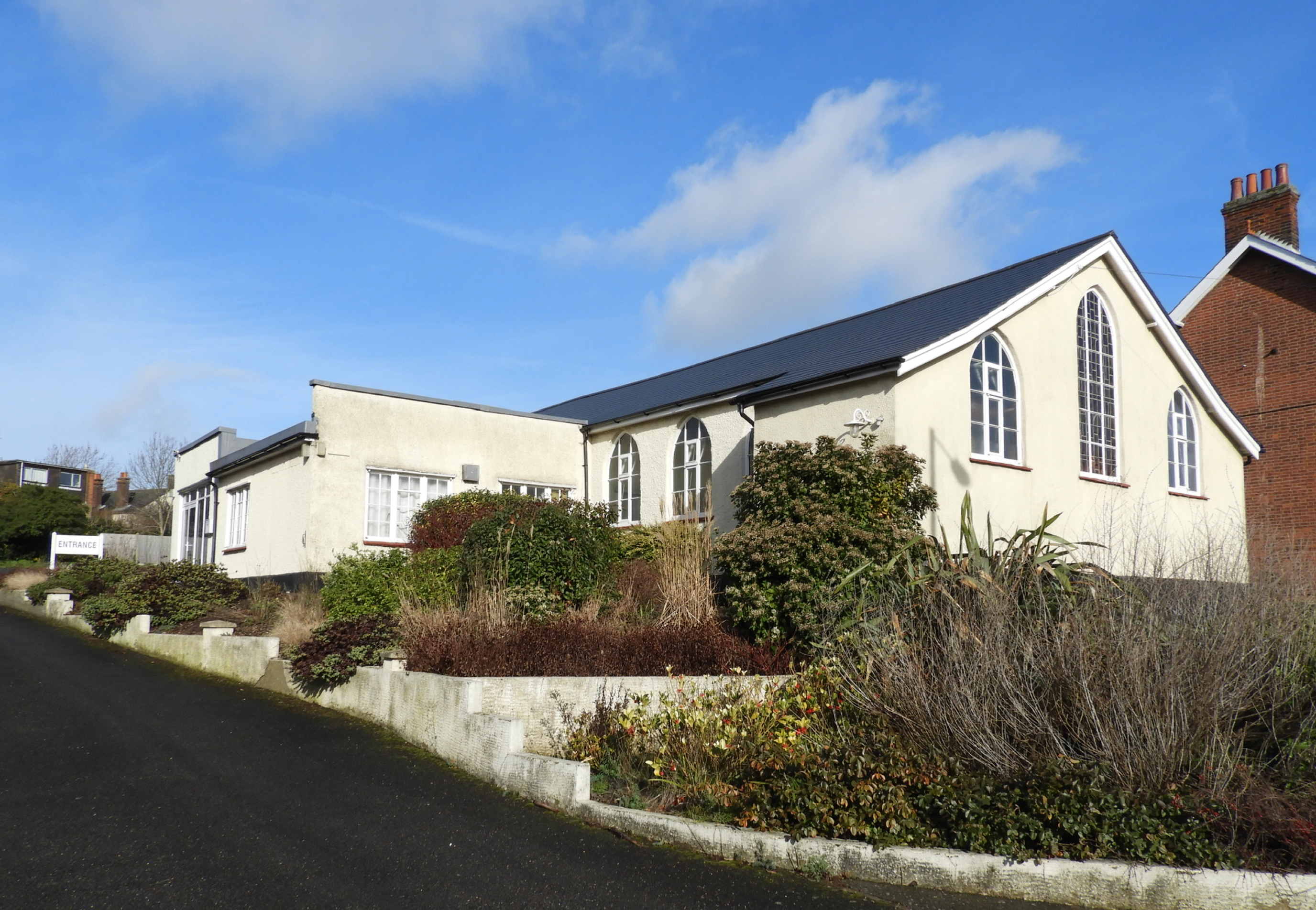
Colchester New Church

Colchester New Church is a Christian New Church in Colchester, England, which has as its theological basis the Old and New Testaments and the theological writings of Emanuel Swedenborg. Colchester New Church is part of the General Church of the New Jerusalem.

== History ==
Colchester New Church began on 26 July 1816 when Rev. Robert Hindmarsh came to give a public lecture in Colchester. Shortly after this lecture a small group formed. They rented various rooms in town for their worship and discussions. In the minutes of the 46th General Conference in 1853, Colchester New Church is listed as having 11 members, and renting a chapel in St. Helen's Lane with U. W. Mattacks as the leader. After this point the history of the Colchester New Church is uncertain until 1880 when George McQueen found the Writings of Swedenborg. In June 1880 Mr. McQueen read Isaac Pitman's Emanuel Swedenborg, the Spiritual Columbus, a little book which quoted from the Swedenborg's Writings. On his 20th birthday, Sunday 12 September 1880, George McQueen walked the 10 miles to Brightlingsea to attend the New Church service and with him walked "Eb" Finch. In 1881 Rev. J. Deans began a series of lectures in Colchester, and a group was formed. Their first official worship was conducted on April 16 of the same year, and in June they rented a room, Shaftsbury Hall. Mr. William Gill joined the society shortly after its formation and became one of its lay preachers. Two members of the society gave money to help finance a church building, but the building did not materialize for 42 years.

In 1885 Rev. C. Griffiths became the pastor in Brightlingsea, and Colchester appointed him as their honorary pastor. At this point the Colchester New Church was still a part of the General Conference of the New Church. However, in 1885 the Colchester society began to read sermons from New Church Life for their Sunday worship. New Church Life is a periodical of the General Church of the New Jerusalem. This might very well have been the beginning of the attraction to the distinctive ideas and principles of the General Church and its academy movement.

In 1890 Rev. C. Griffiths withdrew from the Colchester society because he disagreed with the members' strong sympathies for the General Church of the New Jerusalem. On 6 July Rev. William Frederic Pendleton (of the General Church) gave a sermon that greatly pleased the members in Colchester. On the same day Mr. McQueen became a member of the General Church Academy. The next year in 1891, on 27 March, the Colchester New Church officially withdrew from the Conference to become part of the General Church of the New Jerusalem.

In 1905 William Frederic Pendleton (by now the bishop of the General Church of the New Jerusalem) visited Colchester and discussed the possibility of opening a school, but it was decided that the time was not yet ripe for that.

In 1924 the church building was erected on 175 Maldon Road and around the same time Rev. Gyllenhaal became pastor of the society. In 1926 a day school was started under Muriel Gill.

In 1967 under the leadership of Rev. Frank Rose the church building was expanded. The sanctuary was extended two metres in length, a new school room, and a new entrance porch were added. The designer of the new additions was architect Geoff P. Dawson. The plan had been to dedicate the new school room on 10 December 1966, but building work only finished in mid-January 1967 and it was dedicated by bishop Willard Dandridge Pendleton on 15 April that year.

In 2024, a celebration was held to mark the centenary of the laying of the foundation stone, of the original church building in Maldon Road, on 22nd May 1924.

After more than 100 years, a final service of worship took place at the church in January 2025 and the building was sold.
