= Lord's New Church Which Is Nova Hierosolyma =

Swedenborgian Protestant Christian church

The Lord's New Church Which Is Nova Hierosolyma
- Classification: Restorationist
- Theology: Swedenborgian
- Polity: Episcopal
- Founder: Former members of the General Church of the New Jerusalem
- Origin: 1937; Bryn Athyn, Pennsylvania, U.S. and The Hague, The Netherlands
- Branched from: General Church of the New Jerusalem
- Congregations: Ministries or societies in the United States (Bryn Athyn, Pennsylvania), Lesotho, South Africa, the Netherlands, Sweden, Croatia, Serbia and Ukraine
- Members: Approximately 1,500 worldwide
- Primary schools: 2
- Secondary schools: 1
- Official website: http://www.thelordsnewchurch.com

The Lord's New Church Which Is Nova Hierosolyma, usually referred to as the Lord's New Church, is an international, Christian church based on the Old Testament, the New Testament, and the theological writings of Emanuel Swedenborg, which its members view as the Third Testament.

It was founded in 1937 by former members of the General Church of the New Jerusalem, also a Swedenborgian church, after a doctrinal dispute led to the ousting of Rev. Ernst Pfeiffer of The Hague Society, a branch of the General Church located in the Netherlands.

Headquartered in Bryn Athyn, Pennsylvania, U.S., the Church maintains an international congregation, with ministries or societies in Africa, Europe, and the United States, and has a total membership of approximately 1,500.

== History ==
The Church was founded in 1937, under the principal leadership of Rev. Theodore Pitcairn (son of PPG Industries founder John Pitcairn) and the Rev. Ernst Pfeiffer of The Hague Society in the Netherlands, by former members of the General Church of the New Jerusalem who had left as a result of a doctrinal dispute.

The dispute in question centered on theological ideas proposed by a Dutch layman, H. D. G. Groeneveld, in De Hemelsche Leer (The Celestial Doctrine), a Dutch periodical started by Pfeiffer in 1929. Emanuel Swedenborg, whose writings compose the distinctive body of material used by the General Church, had proposed the idea that the Bible had, in addition to its intended material meaning, a spiritual meaning that had been revealed through the communications between Swedenborg and the angelic realm. The General Church placed paramount authority on the writings of Swedenborg, but Groeneveld went beyond this; he proposed that Swedenborg's theological writings themselves were nothing less than a Third Testament, and thus, according to Swedenborg's ideas, must also have an inner, spiritual meaning.

In the United States, Pitcairn emerged as an early proponent of Groeneveld's perspective. In 1927, he wrote a short book entitled The Book Sealed with Seven Seals to introduce the idea to the American church.

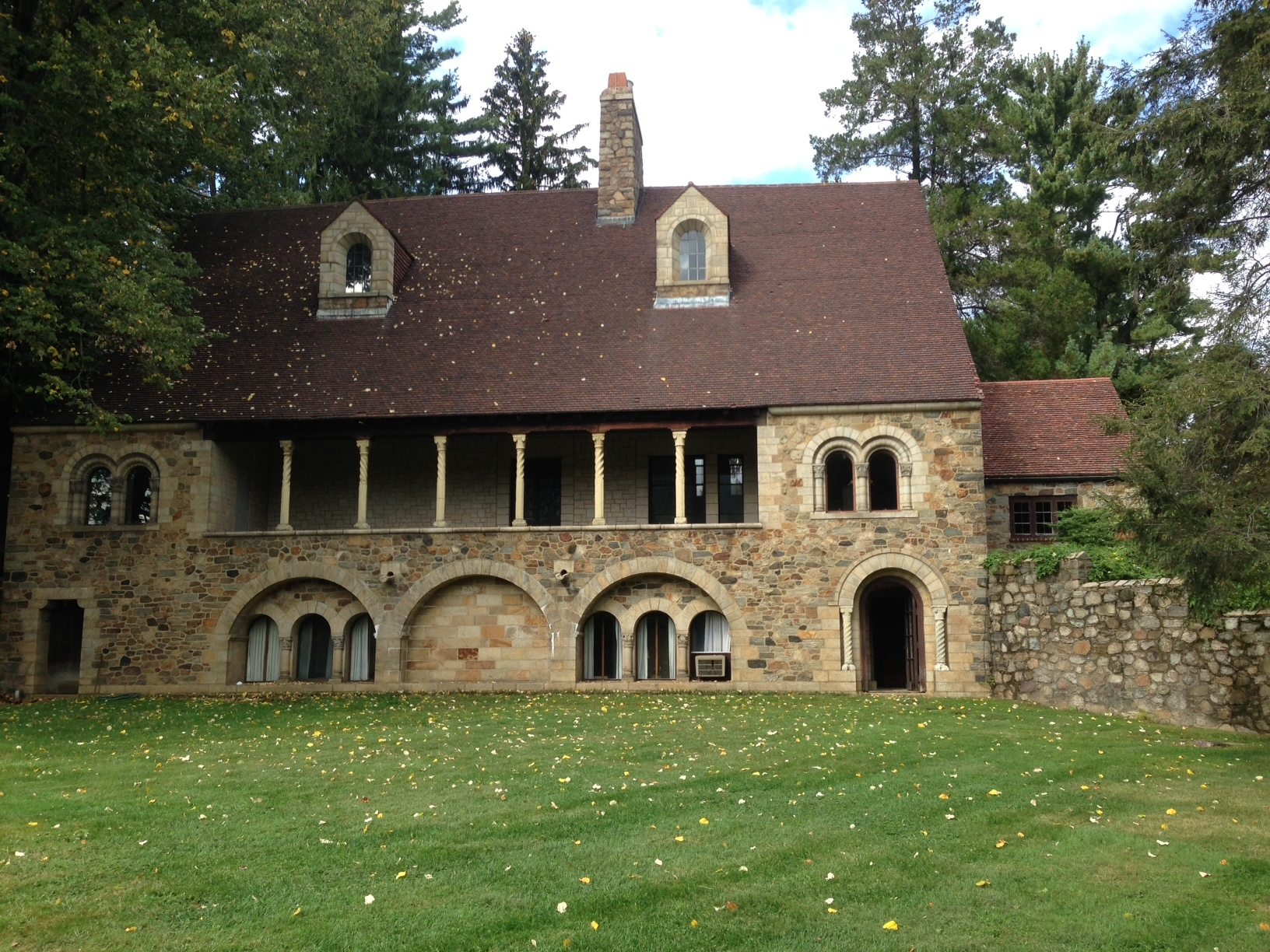
The Lord's New Church, in Bryn Athyn, Pennsylvania

In the 1930s, first the leadership of the General Church, and later, its Council of the Clergy, rejected the leading theses propounded in De Hemelsche Leer. Rev. Pfeiffer, whose Hague Society supported the periodical, was thus ordered to stop publication. When he refused, he was forced, in 1937, to leave the General Church by its leading Bishop, the Rev. George de Charms. This led other leading adherents of the theses, including Pitcairn, to resign that year as well. That same year, Pitcairn, Pfeiffer, and others proceeded to establish the Lord's New Church Which Is Nova Hierosolyma, centered in Bryn Athyn, Pennsylvania, and The Hague, The Netherlands. Hierosolyma is a Hellenized pronunciation of a Hebrew word for Jerusalem.

In 1939, Rev. Pitcairn established a non-profit corporation for the purposes of promoting and maintaining the new church.

The events of the Second World War delayed formalization of the new Church's organization. Finally, in March 1947, the Church's international governmental structure was drawn up by a provisional international council composed of the laymen Groeneveld and Anton Zelling, and the Revs. Pfeiffer, Pitcairn, and Philip N. Odhner, and approved by Church members in America and Holland later that year.

== Teachings and practices ==
The Church is a branch of what is commonly called the "New Church" or the "Swedenborgian Church", and is a post-Reformation form of Christianity that bases its teachings on the Old Testament (written in Hebrew), the New Testament (written in Greek), and the theological writings of Emanuel Swedenborg (written in Latin), the last of which is referred to as the Latin Word. The Lord's New Church differs from the General Church, as its parent denomination is commonly called, and from other Swedenborgian branches, in that the former's members view Swedenborg's theological writings as a Third Testament.

=== The Three Essentials ===
The Church propounds three essential theological principles:

1. The acknowledgment of the Lord Jesus Christ in His Divine Human as the one only God of Heaven and Earth, in Whom is the Divine Trinity.
2. The acknowledgment of the Word of the Lord in its three Testaments, the Old Testament, the New Testament, and the Writings of Emanuel Swedenborg, which are the Third Testament. In this Third Testament the Lord has fulfilled His Second Coming, and all the Divine Truth of His Divine Human from firsts to lasts is present therein in fullness, holiness and power. What is said in this Testament concerning the Sacred Scripture or Word applies also to itself.
3. The life of faith, charity and love into the Lord that is of Heaven, being the Divine essence of eternal life in man and in the Church.

=== The Principles of Doctrine ===
The Church also identifies three 'Principles of Doctrine':

1. It is not the Word that makes the Church, but the understanding of it. The Church is according to its Doctrine and the Doctrine is out of the Word. However the Doctrine does not instaurate the Church, but the integrity and purity of the Doctrine, consequently the understanding (intellectus) of the Word.
2. The Doctrine is spiritual out of celestial origin not out of rational origin.
3. The Third Testament without Doctrine is as a candlestick without light, and those who read that Testament without Doctrine, or who do not acquire for themselves Doctrine out of the Third Testament, are in darkness as to all Truth.

== Church structure and organization ==
The Church is essentially organized as an episcopal polity, a form of church governance which is hierarchical in structure, and in which the chief authority over a local Christian church rests with a bishop. The external governmental structure of the Church is based upon a portion of Swedenborg's writings that describes a 'circle of life' composed of a 'descending line' and an 'ascending line'; the priesthood corresponds to the former and the laity to the latter.

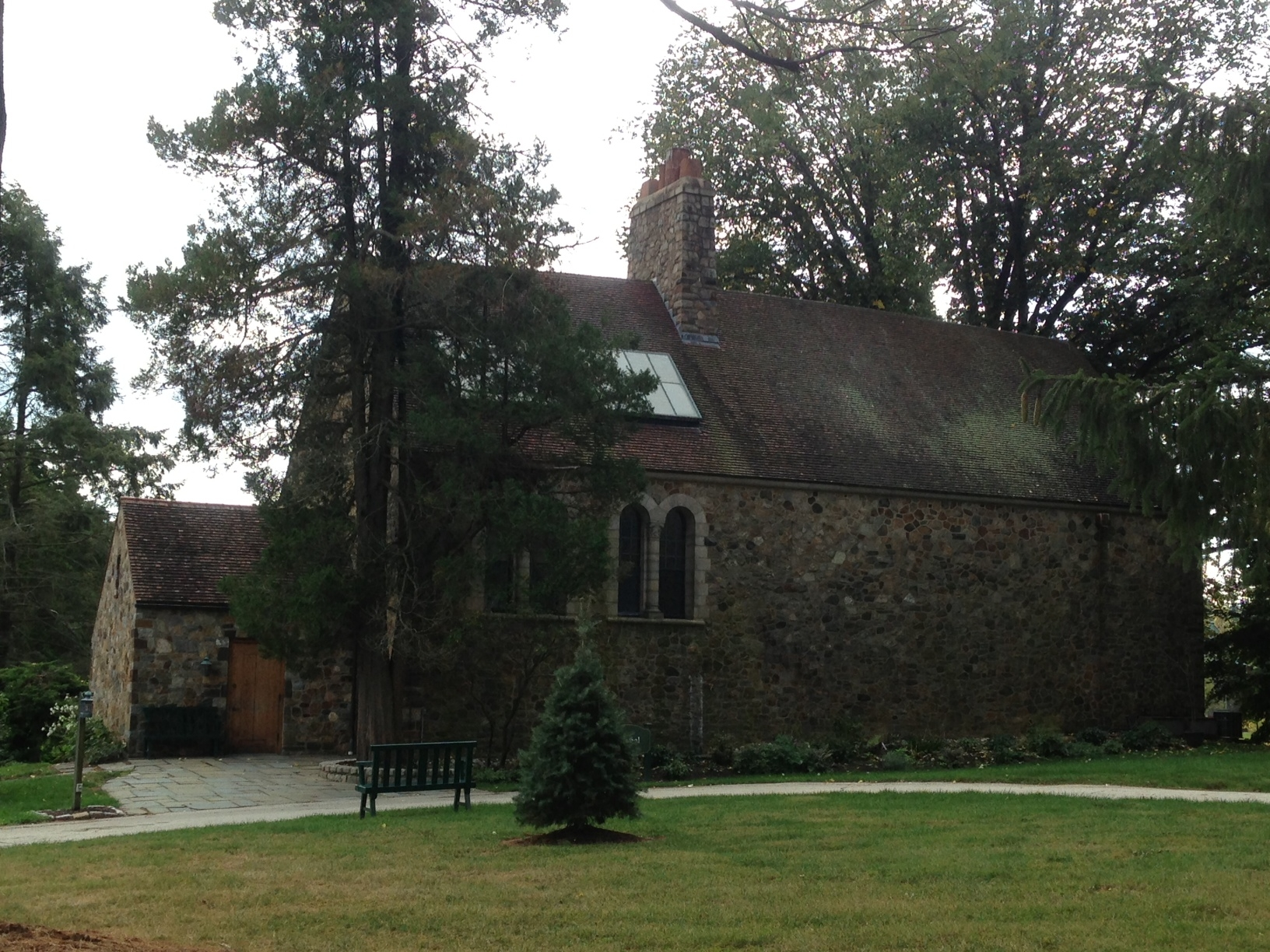
The Lord's New Church, in Bryn Athyn, Pennsylvania

Headquartered in Bryn Athyn, Pennsylvania, U.S., the Church has ministries or "societies" in Africa, Europe, and the United States. It has a worldwide membership of approximately 1500, with the majority of these residing in southern Africa.

The Church operates two primary schools and one secondary school in Lesotho, Africa.

The headquarters of the church, with its main church building, are located adjacent to the Pennypack preserve, west of the Pennypack Creek and the creek road trail.

The Church is supported by a non-profit corporation of the same name.
