= Academy of the New Church Theological School =

Bryn Athyn College of the New Church Theological School
- Type: Theological school
- Established: 1879
- Endowment: $230.0 million
- Faculty: 21
- Students: 9
- Location: Bryn Athyn, Pennsylvania, USA
- Website: www.ancts.org

Bryn Athyn College of the New Church Theological School is a seminary specializing in New Church theology and located in Bryn Athyn, Pennsylvania.

The Theological School is a part of Bryn Athyn College of the New Church, which was incorporated under the laws of the Commonwealth of Pennsylvania on November 3, 1877, as the Academy of the New Church. The charter of the Academy was altered on January 1, 1879, to authorize it to confer degrees and diplomas.

Originally located in Philadelphia, Pennsylvania, the Academy was relocated at the turn of the 20th century to what was then the countryside near Philadelphia, in Montgomery County. Funding from PPG Industries founder John Pitcairn enabled the construction of the new campus.

The Theological School's stated mission is "to support the Lord's presence among people by preparing men for the priesthood of the New Church. The primary focus of this school is on training men to serve as pastors in the General Church of the New Jerusalem. This school will also help provide for the continuing development of priests, and for graduate-level instruction of lay people in New Church doctrine."

The Theological School has been accredited by the Middle States Association since 1952. This accreditation was reaffirmed most recently in 2003.
