= Swedenborgianism =

Restorationist Christian denominations

The New Church
- Classification: Restorationist (Note: At least one scholar has included Swedenborgians within the larger Restorationist family of Christianity.)
- Theology: Swedenborgian Christianity
- Polity: Mixed congregational and episcopal polity
- Origin: 7 May 1787; 239 years ago England

Swedenborgianism (Note: Pronunciation: /swidənˈbɔːrdʒiəˌnɪzəm/, swee-dən-BORJ-ee-ə-NIZZ-əm) or The New Church, refers to the theological tradition of several historically related Christian denominations that developed under the influence of the theology of the Swedish polymath Emanuel Swedenborg (1688–1772).

Swedenborg's writings focus on a narrative of Christianity's historical decline due to the loss of the "inner sense" of Scripture into a purely exoteric understanding of faith. In this state, faith and good acts become external displays motivated by fear of hell, desires for material blessings, personal recognition, and other worldly things, devoid of true spiritual essence. Swedenborg also wrote extensively about Salvation through a process of "regeneration" (rather than through faith or acts alone), wherein individuals accept divine truth from the Lord into their "inner self" (or higher faculties), controlling the "outer" (or earthly) self by placing their highest love in goodness and truth rather than in worldly desires and the evils and falsehoods which serve them.

It follows that Christianity, in its present condition, as described by Swedenborg, fails to facilitate man's regeneration, contributing to a perceived descent of mankind into ignorance and sin. Swedenborg held that a spiritual second coming of Christ had begun, marking the start of the New Church and offering a renewed path to regeneration.

The New Church presents a theology built upon these beliefs, and while presenting many ideas and themes expressed by various early and contemporary Christian thinkers and theologies, the tradition diverges from standard Christianity not only in its eschatology but primarily in its rejection of the notion of a trinity of persons from eternity as polytheistic, instead holding that Christ was born with a "divine mind" or "soul" and human body, absolving his distinct personhood and glorifying his human form through kenosis. At least one scholar has characterised Swedenborgianism as being a part of Restorationist Christianity. The New Church has influenced several other spiritual and philosophical movements, including New Thought and American Transcendentalism.

== History ==
Although Swedenborg spoke in his works about a "New Church" that would be based on the theology he presented, he never tried to establish such an organization. Swedenborg published some of his theological works anonymously; his writings promoted one universal church based on love and charity, rather than multiple churches named after their founders and based on belief or doctrine.

In 1768, a heresy trial began in Sweden against Swedenborg's writings and two men who promoted them; the trial questioned whether Swedenborg's theological writings were consistent with Christian doctrine. A royal ordinance in 1770 declared that his writings were "clearly mistaken" and should not be taught, but his theology was never examined.

Swedenborg's clerical supporters were ordered to stop using his teachings, and customs officials were directed to impound his books and stop their circulation in any district unless the nearest consistory granted permission. Swedenborg begged the king for grace and protection in a letter from Amsterdam; a new investigation of him stalled, and was dropped in 1778.

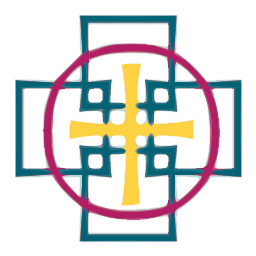
Swedenborgian cross

At the time of Swedenborg's death in England, where he had often visited, few efforts had been made to establish an organised church. Two Anglican clergymen were conspicuous in the work of disseminating his writings: Thomas Hartley (died 1784), rector of Winwick, Cheshire, and John Clowes, rector of St John's Church, Manchester. Hartley translated Heaven and Hell (1778) and True Christian Religion (1781); Clowes, who taught New Church doctrine in the existing churches and was opposed to the forming of new organisations, translated 17 volumes, including the Arcana Coelestia, and published over 50 volumes of exposition and defense. Through his influence Lancashire became the stronghold of the Swedenborgians.

In 1782 a society for publishing Swedenborg's writings was formed in Manchester, and in December 1783 a little company of sympathizers with similar aims met in London and founded a "Theosophical Society" among the members of which were John Flaxman the sculptor, William Sharp the engraver, and François-Hippolyte Barthélémon the composer. In the early days most of them worshipped at the Female Orphan Asylum, St George's, whose chaplain, Rev. Jacob Duche, like Clowes at Manchester, preached the doctrines from his own pulpit. Five prominent Wesleyan preachers adopted the new teaching and were cut off from their connection, a step which led, in spite of remonstrance from Clowes and others, to the formal founding.

On 7 May 1787 (15 years after Swedenborg's death), the New Church movement was formally founded in England. A number of churches had sprung up around England by 1789, and in April of that year the first General Conference of the New Church was held in Great Eastcheap, London. Later a weekly newspaper, the Morning Light, was published, as well as monthly magazines for adults (the New Church Magazine) and young people. The liturgy (containing five services for Morning and Evening, together with the order of Baptism, Holy Supper, Marriage, etc.) was prepared in 1828, revised and extended in 1875; the hymnal of 1823 was revised and enlarged in 1880.

New Church ideas were spread in the United States by missionaries, one of whom was John Chapman (Johnny Appleseed). Early missionaries also travelled to parts of Africa. Swedenborg believed that the "African race" was "in greater enlightenment than others on this earth, since they are such that they think more 'interiorly', and so receive truths and acknowledge them." African enlightenment was considered a liberal concept at the time, and Swedenborgians accepted freed African converts in their homes as early as 1790. Several Swedenborgians were also abolitionists.

Occultism became increasingly popular during the 19th century (particularly in the United States, France, and England), and some followers blended Swedenborg's writings with theosophy, cabala, alchemy, and divination. Swedenborg's mystical side fascinated them; they concentrated on Heaven and Hell, which describes Swedenborg's visits to Heaven and Hell to experience (and report on) the conditions there. In structure, it was related to Dante's Divine Comedy.

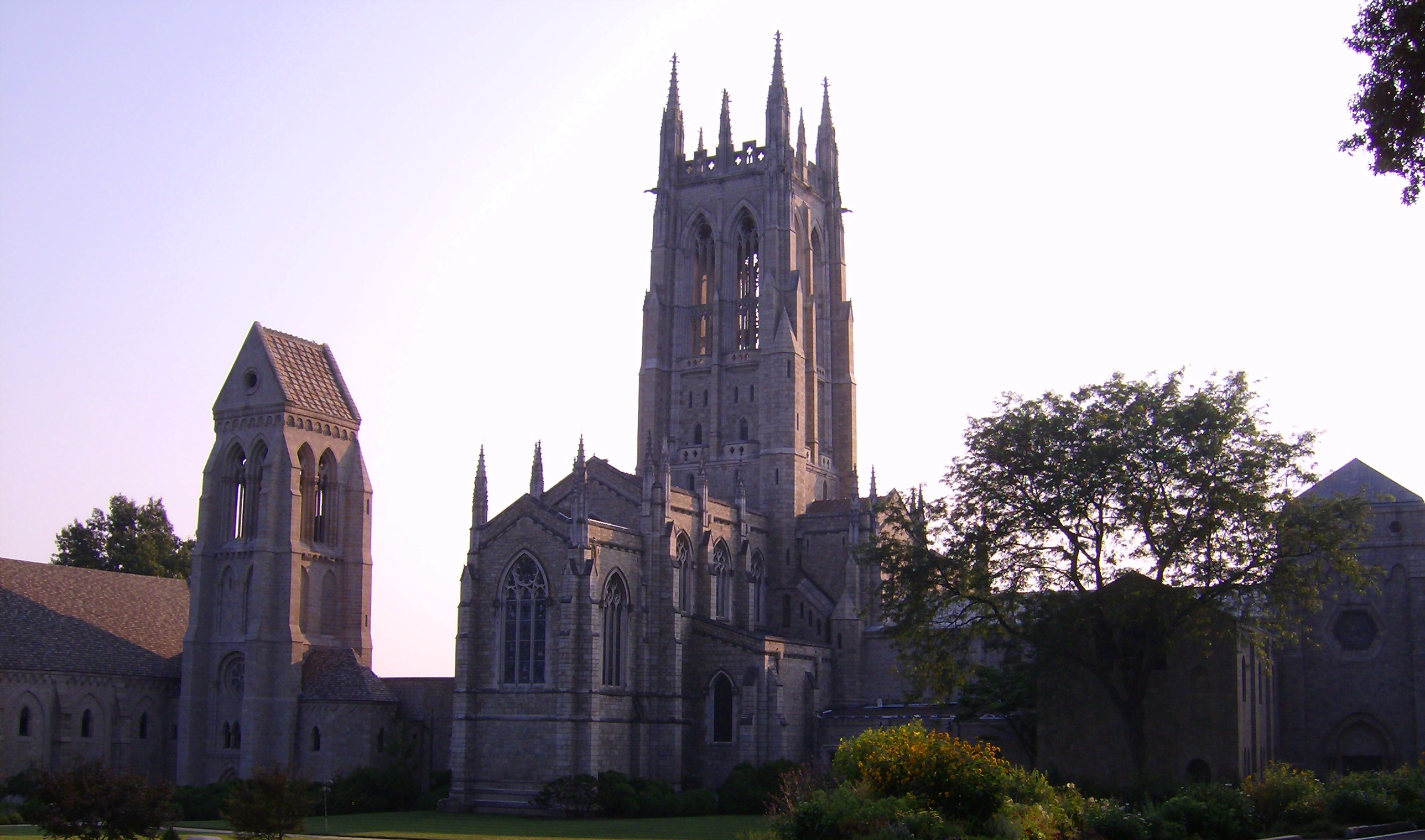
Bryn Athyn Cathedral of the General Church in Pennsylvania

The U.S. church was organised in 1817 with the founding of the General Convention of the New Church (sometimes shortened to the Convention), now also known as the Swedenborgian Church of North America. The movement in the United States strengthened until the late 19th century, and there was a New-Church Theology School in Cambridge. Controversies about doctrine and the authority of Swedenborg's writings caused a faction to split off and form the Academy of the New Church. It later became known as the General Church of the New Jerusalem – sometimes called the General Church – with its headquarters in Bryn Athyn, Pennsylvania (a suburb of Philadelphia). Other congregations felt doctrinally compelled to join the General Church at its inception. Two Convention congregations in Canada (one in Toronto and another in Kitchener) and two congregations from the British Conference – Michael Church in London and Colchester New Church – joined the General Church.

The Adelaide Society of the New Church, in Adelaide, in the Colony of South Australia. was founded by Jacob Pitman, William Holden, and Smith Owen Smith and their families in 1844. On 11 July 1852, a Swedenborgian church opened on Carrington Street, with Pitman serving as minister until 1859. The congregation grew to a peak in the 1890s, by which time a new church had been built in Hanson Street. In 1971, a new church was built at Warradale, in a style that could be converted to a house in the future.

== Branches and membership ==
As of 2000, the most recent membership figures for the four church organisations were:

- General Conference of the New Church (Great Britain): 1,314
- Swedenborgian Church of North America, also known as the General Convention (USA): 2,029
- General Church of the New Jerusalem: 5,563
- The Lord's New Church Which Is Nova Hierosolyma: 1,000
- The New Church of Southern Africa: membership not confirmed yet
- New Churches (Swedenborgian): 225 (Australian Bureau of Statistics, 2021 census)

Membership in the New Church has always been small, and the organisations have been deeply involved in publishing.

== The two doctrines of the New Church ==
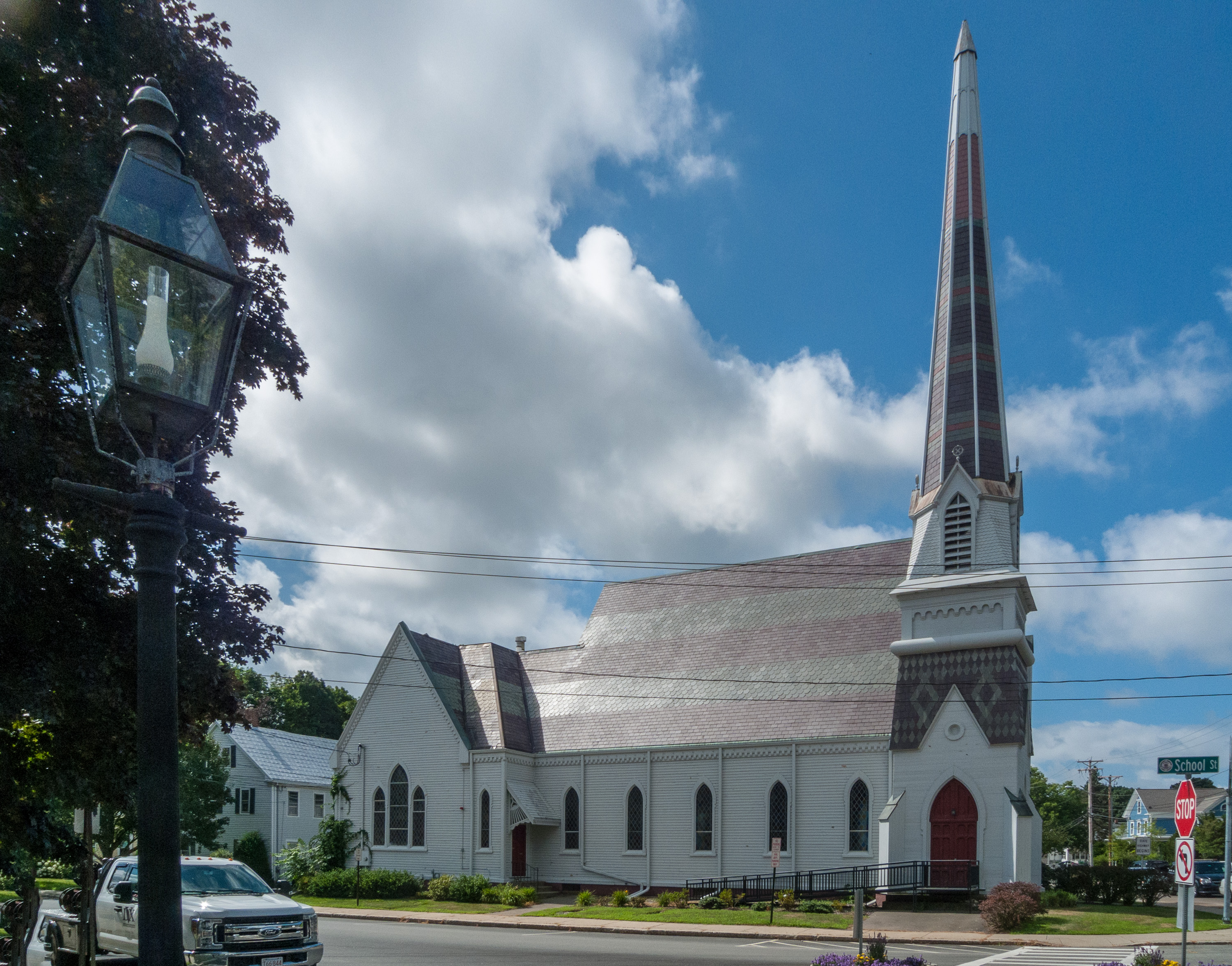
New Jerusalem Church, in Bridgewater, Massachusetts, is a congregation of the Swedenborgian Church of North America.

The New Church has two essential doctrines. The first is that there is one God, Jehovah, who incarnated as Jesus so that he may redeem mankind.

The second is the obligation to live according to his commandments. "There are two essentials which constitute the church, and hence two principle things of doctrine – one, that the Lord's Human is Divine; the other, that love to the Lord and charity toward the neighbor constitute the church, and not faith separate from love and charity." These "two things, the acknowledgment of the Lord, and a life according to the precepts of the Decalogue […] are the two essentials of the New Church."

Adherents believe that these two doctrines bring about salvation and union with Jesus. "All things of the doctrine of the New Church have reference to these two, because they are its universals, on which all the particulars depend, and are its essentials, from which all the formalities proceed"

If a person is unaware of the doctrines but has believed in one God and lived a life of love for goodness and truth, according to Swedenborg, they will learn them after death.

=== Doctrine of the Lord ===
The New Church's universal principle of faith is that the "Lord from eternity, who is Jehovah, came into the world to subjugate the hells and to glorify His Human; and without this no mortal could have been saved; and those are saved who believe in Him":

It is a universal principle of faith that God is one in essence and in person, in whom is a Divine trinity, and that He is the Lord God the Savior Jesus Christ. It is a universal principle of faith that no mortal could have been saved unless the Lord had come into the world. It is a universal principle of faith that He came into the world to remove hell from man, and that He did remove it by means of contests with it and victories over it, and thereby He subdued it and reduced it to order and made it obedient to Himself. It is a universal principle of faith that He came into the world to glorify His Human which He took on in the world, that is, to unite it with the Divine from which [are all things], and thereby He eternally holds hell in order and under obedience to Himself. As this could be accomplished only by means of temptations admitted into His Human, even to the last of them, which was the passion of the cross, He endured even that.

From this doctrine, the Trinity is defined as "the three essentials of one God, and they make one as soul, body, and operation make one in man. Before the world was created this Trinity was not; but after creation, when God became incarnate, it was provided and brought about; and then in the Lord God the Redeemer and Savior Jesus Christ." As a trinity of body, soul, and spirit exists in every man, this became the Holy Trinity in Jesus. The doctrine of one God as one person distinguishes the New Church from other Christian churches, most of which define the Trinity as three eternal persons. The New Church sees Trinitarianism as illogical: "In the ideas of thought a Trinity of Divine Persons from eternity, or before the world was created, is a Trinity of Gods; and these ideas cannot be effaced by a lip-confession of one God."

Monotheism is defined as one God who is one person; only the Lord (Jehovah) is worshipped. Worship of, and faith in, Jesus is not worshiping a created being: although he was born with a human body, the New Church holds that his soul was eternally divine. When he rose from the dead, he discarded the human body he inherited from Mary and put on a human body from the divinity within him (known in the New Church as the Divine Human).

According to Swedenborg, God the Father is the inner divinity which became outwardly manifest in human form known as the Son. Since adherents believe that the Lord is one with the Father, the Lord's Prayer is directed to the Lord only. In the opening "Our Father, who art in heaven, hallowed be Thy name", "name" is everything by which God is worshiped (particularly the Son, through whom he is approached).

According to the New Testament, Jesus sometimes prayed to the Father and declared himself one with the Father at other times. New Church adherents believe that this was because Jesus progressed towards God during his life by gradually making his human body one with the divine.

=== Doctrines of faith and charity ===
New Church adherents believe that "Regeneration" brings salvation. Regeneration is the process by which man is re-born, transitioning from the 'sense-oriented' sinful life he was born into, to a 'spiritual life', where man makes goodness and truth his highest love rather than worldly pleasures, and proceeds to live a life of usefulness and love. God incarnated as Christ to provide man with a path to regeneration, therefore true faith in Jesus Christ leads to salvation.

Faith in Jesus is faith in a visible God. Jesus is the image and form of the invisible God, on whom the human mind can focus. According to the New Church, God is man himself. If a person is good and follows the truth, God lives in that person (who becomes an image and likeness of him). The New Church is said to be the "crown of all churches which preceded it", since the invisible God is worshiped in human form.

Faith is not defined as belief alone; the New Church holds that faith without charity is not faith, and charity without faith is not charity; in this way, faith and charity are intertwined. Faith and charity become one in acts of good works or repentance. The union of faith and charity is a central tenet of the New Church; all substantial things are related to divine love and divine wisdom, and the will and understanding of each person is a receptacle of God's love and wisdom.

According to New Church adherents, a person must learn and live by the truth; in the union between humanity and the Lord facilitated by man's acceptance of divine truth, faith becomes living and spiritual. All the precepts of how one should live are contained in the Ten Commandments. The first act of faith is repentance: self-examination, acknowledging and identifying one's sins, and turning away from them, along with all evil.

=== The Bible ===
The Bible concerns God and his kingdom. The New Church has three pillars: God's divinity, the holiness of the Bible, and a life of good works. The Bible is divinely inspired; according to adherents, its spiritual sense has been revealed in the New Church through symbolic correspondence. Its literal meaning, similar to a parable, hides the inner, spiritual sense: "The truths of the sense of the letter of the Word are in part not naked truths, but are appearances of truth, and like similitudes and comparisons are taken from such things as are in nature; and thus are such as have been accommodated and adapted to the capacity of the simple and also of children."

The Bible cannot be properly understood without doctrine, and church doctrine should be confirmed with it. Doctrine can only be known by those who are enlightened by God, and those who are not can fall into heresy. The Bible contains divine truth; according to New Church adherents, a person joins God and his angels when reading it.

== Free will, sin and regeneration ==
To Swedenborg, man is born not into total depravity, but rather, into a state of ignorance of anything beyond his "outer self"; his five senses and desire for worldly pleasures. In this state, man, by birth, places his principal love in worldly things such as wealth and ego over God and neighbor, because he has no knowledge of the spiritual truths that would lead him to love these. In this state, man’s 'inner self' (his higher faculties of rationality, will, conscience, etc.) is made a servant to the outer self.

Salvation is possible through Regeneration, a process in which man accepts divine truth from the Lord, and with this knowledge is able to make love of God and Neighbor his highest love in place of worldly things, reforming his inner and outer being, and being born anew into a state of enlightenment, where "Our inner self is in heaven, and an angel among the angels we are going to live with after we die".

=== Regeneration as a spiritual battle ===
New Church adherents believe that man is born with free will, and his ability to choose between good and evil originates from his spiritual equilibrium between heaven and hell. Hell influences humans to do evil, and heaven influences them to do good. This freedom from inherent control from one side or the other frees humans to think rationally which can lead to spiritual reform by acknowledging evil in oneself, ceasing to do evil and avoiding it. This choice is spiritual because every thought and action influences the soul and mind.

Man's salvation is heavily affected by spiritual forces. Truly good works join a person with angels, and evil joins them with evil spirits. When divine truth is accepted and one has an evil desire, temptation (conflict) results. Although one must resist temptation, it is really a combat between God and the devil (or hell). Thus, "He who thinks that he fights from himself against the devil is enormously deceived."

Both Salvation and Condemnation are results of moral choices, based on intentions. Good acts are only considered good when evil is removed, that is to say they are done out of love for God (not for profit or honour, or any other earthly thing), otherwise they are only externally good and internally evil. Goodness comes only from God, who can conquer temptation (a continuous, lifelong process).

Remission of sins is their removal after repentance. Swedenborgianism detests the notions of total depravity, and the traditional understandings of salvation through acts, and salvation through faith alone, through grace alone. New Church theology holds that man can desire good and must identify his sinful tendencies, push them aside in place of goodwill, and move from a state of overall ignorance and evil to overall enlightenment and goodness. Man should not simply accept his sinful state and expect faith or acts alone to guarantee him a place in heaven.

=== Christ, the Church, and salvation ===
Since, without the aid of divine truth, man remains in a state of Ignorance, the salvation of humanity has always required that a unifying connection between God and the minds of men is maintained through the "Word", or divine revelation of truths required for regeneration. The "Church", as a term, refers to any people, culture, or religion where "the Lord is acknowledged and the Word exists". The term does not simply refer to Christendom. Christianity’s predecessor, Judaism, as well as all other faiths of the world, though imperfect, are or were, at one point, expressions of the Word. Anyone who believes in God and loves goodness and truth is part of the Church and may be regenerated.

Swedenborg divides history into a series of churches, or stages of the Church, that were born and eventually "died", that is to say, became "naturalistic" and devoid of spiritual truth, serving the fears and worldly desires of man rather than providing regeneration. Because of this, the equilibrium between heaven and hell became more and more unbalanced towards the powers of hell prior to the coming of Christ, threatening the entire human race.

It is for this reason that God took human form. By doing so, he could provide man with a means of regeneration through his teachings and fight hell directly; Jesus experienced temptation, conquered it, descended into hell, and defeated the forces of evil.

The New Church differs from older Christian churches on the notion that Christ's death was redemption itself; "The belief that the passion of the cross was redemption itself is a fundamental error of the church; and that error, together with the error concerning three Divine persons from eternity, has perverted the whole church, so that nothing spiritual is left in it." The crucifixion was the last temptation endured by Jesus.

== Afterlife ==
New Church adherents believe that there was no space and time before the universe was created, and the realm beyond space, time and material creation is the spiritual world. The spiritual world, which is divided between heaven and hell, is where the soul is realized. "All who die and become angels put off those two things proper to nature, which […] are space and time; for they enter then into spiritual light, in which the objects of thought are truths, and the objects of sight are similar to the objects in the natural world, but correspondent to their thoughts." States of being replace time, love replaces space or distance, and perception of truth replaces material substance.

These correspondences to time, space, and substance fill the spiritual world with correspondences to things of the material world. In heaven there are landscapes and cities appearing like those of earth, and in hell the landscape appears cavernous and filthy. The presence of the lord appears like a sun above in heaven, its light and heat are truth and goodness, while hell is dark and cold. There are heavenly delights and acts of service to the neighbor, and hellish delights which bring about only suffering. The soul is given a new mind and body, or "a human form that is visible in the spiritual world [... where] Our spirit enjoys the abilities to see, hear, speak, and have sensations just as it did in this world, and is endowed every faculty of thinking, willing, and doing...".

=== Origin of the soul ===
New Church adherents believe that the soul is the recipient of life from God, and the body is its clothing. The beginning of life (the soul) comes from the seed of the father, and the external body comes from the mother. Since most Christians believe that Jesus was born of a virgin by the Holy Spirit, his soul was God itself and he always preexisted as Jehovah. Since souls originate from the seed of the father, New Church adherents do not believe in reincarnation.

Spirits and angels, through whom one approaches heaven or hell (depending on one's actions), are associated with a person during their life. Although direct communication between spirits and humans does not generally occur, it was more widespread in ancient times. Angels and spirits retain their memories from earthly and heavenly life (their earthly mental faculties of memory replaced with corresponding spiritual ones) and, in a mental state where communication is open, a person may experience a spirit's memory as if it were their own. This mental state (which may be achieved under hypnosis) resembles past life regression and was how some ancients came to believe in the preexistence of souls and reincarnation. However, the New Church does not consider this to be true, instead believing that one lives only once, and how one lives this life determines one's eternal destiny. At death, the soul sheds the physical body, is born into a spiritual mind and body, and becomes aware of the spiritual society with which one's soul was associated.

=== Judgment ===
New Church adherents do not believe in purgatory; punishment occurs only in hell. Immediately after death, one enters the spirit world (in this case, meaning an intermediary state between heaven and hell) and awaits judgment of whether they will enter heaven or hell. Since the evil try to appear good and the good retain false ideas, one remains in this intermediate state until they are examined. Those who are profoundly good and know truth go immediately to heaven, and those who are profoundly evil flee from heaven's perceived blinding light and burning heat, and go to hell.

Otherwise, one gradually withdraws from exterior appearances and fallacies into one's interior intentions and affections "Thus hidden things are laid open and secret things are uncovered, according to the Lord's words: 'There is nothing covered that shall not be revealed, and hid that shall not be known: whatsoever ye have said in the darkness, shall be heard in the light, and what ye have spoken in the ear in closets, shall be preached on the housetops' (Luke 12:2–3). And in another place: 'I say unto you, that every idle word that men shall speak, they shall give account thereof in the day of judgment' (Matthew 12:36)."

These intentions and affections determine whether one, in a state of absolute freedom from external controls, will be attracted by heavenly light or hellish delight. Ultimately, judgement is an unimpeded choice between heaven and hell; the good, by nature of their goodness, will choose heaven, and the evil, by nature of their evil, will choose hell.

=== Hell ===
When all external restraints are removed in the spirit world, nothing remains to stop evil spirits except punishment. Since evil spirits act in accordance with their nature, they are drawn towards hell:

Every evil brings with itself punishment, the two making one; whoever therefore is in evil, is also in the punishment of evil. But still no one in the other world suffers punishment on account of the evils which he had done in this world, but on account of the evils which he then does. Yet it amounts to the same, and is the same thing, whether it be said that men suffer punishment on account of their evils in the world, or that they suffer punishment on account of the evils which they do in the other life, inasmuch as every one after death returns into his own life, and thus into similar evils, his nature remaining the same as it had been in the life of the body. That they are punished, is because the fear of punishment is the only means of subduing evils in this state. Exhortation is no longer of any avail, neither instruction, nor the fear of the law and loss of reputation, since every one now acts from his nature, which cannot be restrained nor broken except by punishments.

New Church adherents believe that God sends no one to heaven or hell; since hell is the internal state of evil and heaven the internal state of good, each person enters a state matching his or her internal nature. Because every spirit joins the like-minded group after death in which it feels the most comfortable according to Swedenborg, hell is believed to be a place of happiness for the spirits which delight in evilness. Each person will remain eternally in accordance with their will or love.

=== Heaven ===
New Church adherents believe that heaven proceeds from God, who is seen by the angels as the light of heaven and occasionally appears in angelic form. Jesus said that he was the light of the world, and the apostles once saw his face shining like a sun. For this reason, the ancients aligned their temples with the rising sun. In heaven, countless societies fulfill a particular purpose, each according to their love.

Since angels and demons were human, angels have a human form. There is no individual devil (or Satan): "In the whole heaven there is not one angel who was so created from the beginning, nor in hell any devil who was created an angel of light and cast down; but that all, both in heaven and in hell, are from the human race; in heaven those who lived in the world in heavenly love and faith, in hell those who lived in infernal love and faith; and that hell taken as a whole is what is called the devil and satan."

== Eschatology ==
New Church adherents do not believe in an end of the world. The church has passed through several ages, each ending with a spiritual Last Judgement; the last of these occurred in 1757. Judgments also occurred at the time of Noah's Flood and Jesus' crucifixion. The purpose of the judgments is to separate good from evil in the intermediate spiritual world lying between heaven and hell. As a result of the judgments, a new age (or new church) begins among the people on earth. The New Church is a result of revelation.

Four churches have preceded the New Church. The first was the "Most Ancient Church" before the flood, when contact with heaven was direct. The second was the "Ancient Church", following the flood, which was destroyed by idolatry. The third was Judaism, which began with the revelation of the Ten Commandments to Moses on Mount Sinai. The fourth was Christianity, established by Jesus and his apostles, which divided into the Eastern Orthodox Church, the Catholic Church, and Protestantism.

Adherents believe that the New Church, the final phase, is a renewal of Christianity based on Jesus' Second Coming. It is the fulfilment of the prophecy of a New Jerusalem in the Book of Revelation. Swedenborg said that the New Church would be established gradually, since the false beliefs of the former churches had to be set aside.

== Sacraments ==
=== Baptism and Eucharist ===
The New Church has two primary sacraments: baptism and the Eucharist (also known as communion, or holy supper). These external rituals symbolise inner, spiritual life. Baptism signifies entrance into Christianity and reformation of the mind, where falseness is replaced by truth. Although believers should be baptised at the age of reason (to make a decision to follow Jesus), Swedenborg said that baptised infants receive a guardian angel to guide them into the Christian faith.

=== Marriage ===
Marriage is a personal sacrament of the New Church, and its administration by a priest is desirable but not essential. According to Swedenborg, marriage should be administered by a priest "because marriages, considered in themselves, are spiritual, and thence holy; for they descend from the heavenly marriage of good and truth, and things conjugial correspond to the divine marriage of the Lord and the church; and hence they are from the Lord himself."

Married love is founded in religion, since both originate from God. Without a religious foundation, a marriage can turn cold. According to the New Church, man is a form of truth and woman is a form of love; the two make one. Married love comes directly from heaven, and celibacy interferes with this. Therefore, marriage is preferable to celibacy. Marriage is considered a union of souls, and this can only exist between one man and one woman.

Contrary to mainstream Christian beliefs, Swedenborg did not condemn all sexual activity between those who were not married. While he was particularly against infidelity, Swedenborg believed that all erotic love between a man and a woman – even that which arose within unpropitious circumstances – still had the potential to develop into true conjugal love. He also believed that not all married couples necessarily experience conjugal love.

== Biblical canon ==
New Church adherents believe that the word of God is in the Bible, which has a symbolic, hidden spiritual meaning. Swedenborg's visions told him how (and why) the Bible is divinely inspired and are described in his multi-volume Arcana Coelestia (Heavenly Secrets). He called its symbolic language, where passages follow each other coherently and logically, correspondence. This inner meaning was kept hidden, and was revealed when humanity was ready. This hidden meaning distinguishes the Bible from other books, and Swedenborg supports his statements with biblical passages. The books with this inner, spiritual meaning forms the New Church biblical canon.

=== Old Testament ===
According to Swedenborg, the original text of the Old Testament is preserved in the Hebrew Masoretic Text, where letters were counted by the Masoretes to ensure that the text remained accurate. Like Judaism does, he divides the Old Testament into three parts: the Law of Moses, the Prophets, and the Psalms. The Old Testament books with an internal spiritual sense (and, thus, divinely inspired) include:

- The Law of Moses

- Genesis
- Exodus
- Leviticus
- Numbers
- Deuteronomy
- Joshua
- Judges
- Samuel
- Kings

- The Prophets

- Isaiah
- Jeremiah
- Lamentations
- Ezekiel
- Daniel
- Hosea
- Joel
- Amos
- Obadiah
- Jonah
- Micah
- Nahum
- Habakkuk
- Zephaniah
- Haggai
- Zechariah
- Malachi

- The Psalms

Swedenborg's grouping differs from Judaism's; he assigned Joshua, Judges, Samuel and Kings to the Law of Moses, but according to the Jewish biblical canon the Law of Moses (the Torah) refers to the first five books – Joshua, Judges, Samuel and Kings belong to the Prophets (Nevi'im). Elsewhere, however, Swedenborg says that Moses and Elijah represent the Law and the Prophets respectively.

The other books of the Old Testament (which are not generally believed to be divinely inspired) include those grouped by the Jews as "Writings" (Ketuvim). The Greek Septuagint incorporated other writings into the Hebrew texts, which Martin Luther placed in the intertestamental section titled Apocrypha, located between the Old Testament and New Testament. Although the Jews included Lamentations, Daniel and the Psalms in the Ketuvim, New Church adherents consider them divinely inspired.

=== New Testament ===
The New Church regards the words of Jesus as divinely inspired, and considers the New Testament Gospels of Matthew, Mark, Luke, John and the Book of Revelation as sacred scripture. The church holds the Acts of the Apostles and the epistles in esteem, similar to the Jewish regard for the Old Testament writings. Swedenborg wrote that these books were included as an act of divine providence, since books for the general public explaining Christian doctrine were needed. He believed that although Paul's letters did not contain a word-for-word symbolic correspondence, they were still divinely influenced: "Paul indeed spoke from inspiration, but not in the same way as the prophets, to whom every single word was dictated but that his inspiration was that he received an influx, according to those things which were with him, which is quite a different inspiration, and has no conjunction with heaven by correspondences."

=== Pre-biblical texts ===
Swedenborg believed that sacred texts of an "Ancient Church" in the Middle East preceded Judaism, but the texts have been lost. Some, such as The Wars of Jehovah (mentioned in Numbers 21:14–15) and another book similar to those in the Prophets (mentioned in Numbers 21:27–30), are quoted in the Bible (see non-canonical books referenced in the Bible). Another work that Swedenborg believed belonged to the ancient church was the Book of Jasher, which is also quoted in the Bible (Joshua 10:12–13, 2 Samuel 1:17–18); according to him, this book still existed in Tartary.

A Hebrew midrash, Sefer haYashar was published in Venice in 1625; an English translation was published in 1840. The Hebrew text was examined by the 19th-century biblical scholar George Bush (a relative of the Bush family), who later became a Swedenborgian minister. Although the New Church has no official position on this Hebrew text, Swedenborg said that the first parts of Genesis were taken from the "Ancient Word" and are found in the book of Jasher.

== Assessment of other beliefs ==
The doctrines of the New Church review and assess the doctrines of earlier churches. Swedenborg believed that before the New Church can be received, the doctrines of older churches must be exposed and rejected; the New Church is so opposed to the doctrines of the older Christian churches that they cannot coexist.

=== Nicene Christianity ===
==== Former Christian creeds ====
In the New Church, authority is based on divine revelation rather than creeds or church councils. All doctrine should be confirmed by scripture. The interpretation of scripture is determined by doctrine, however, and enlightenment by God should be sought when reading his words.

===== Apostles' Creed =====
The Apostles' Creed, the creed of the Apostolic Church, does not refer to a trinity: "I believe in God the Father Almighty, Creator of heaven and earth; and in Jesus Christ His only Son our Lord, who was conceived by the Holy Spirit, born of the Virgin Mary: also in the Holy Spirit." This creed is in agreement with the New Church, since it does not mention an eternally existing son.

===== Nicene Creed =====
The Nicene and Athanasian Creeds introduced the trinity. The Nicene Creed is a modified version of the Apostles' Creed; according to the New Church, a trinity of persons is a trinity of gods. The creed also introduces the concept of a son "begotten from eternity", which the New Church considers erroneous: "the Human, by which God sent Himself into the world, is the Son of God."

===== Athanasian Creed =====
The New Church considers the Athanasian Creed, like the Nicene, incorrect in defining a trinity of persons. However, the church believes that the Athanasian Creed can be corrected if a trinity of one person in God is understood when it speaks of a trinity of persons. The creed expresses the church's doctrine of the divine human: "That our Lord Jesus Christ, the Son of God, is both God and Man; and although He is God and Man, still there are not two, but there is one Christ. He is one, because the Divine took to itself the Human; yea, He is altogether one, for He is one Person: since as the soul and the body make one man, so God and Man is one Christ." According to the New Church, God's human nature was made divine.

===== Chalcedonian Definition =====
The Council of Chalcedon declared that Jesus has two natures (divine and human), which contradicts New Church doctrine. Swedenborg said that it was revealed to him in a heavenly vision that:

[T]hose who had the greatest influence in the council, and who were superior to the rest in rank and authority, came together in a dark room and there concluded that both a Divine and a human nature should be attributed to the Lord; principally for the reason, that otherwise the papal sway could not be maintained. For if they had acknowledged the Lord to be one with the Father, as He Himself says, no one could have been recognized as His vicar on earth; and schisms were arising at that time, by which the papal power might have fallen and been dissipated, if they had not made this distinction. Then to give their decision strength, they sought out confirmations from the Word, and persuaded the rest.

Although most other churches maintain that Jesus has two natures, the New Church believes that his human nature was made divine.

==== Catholicism ====
According to Swedenborgianism, the Catholic Church has perverted scripture to obtain primacy and dominion in spiritual matters. The Council of Chalcedon declared that Jesus has a divine and human nature so that the pope could claim to be the vicar of Christ and appropriate spiritual powers to the priesthood that belong to God alone. Authority is claimed by the pope and the priesthood over that of scripture. The desire to spiritually rule others or appear pious for honour and reputation originates from self-love, which is opposite the love of God and others.

Papal primacy is claimed by the Catholic Church from an interpretation of Matthew 16:18–19, where the apostle Peter is appointed the rock on which the church will be built and given the keys to heaven. In the New Church, this passage is understood spiritually; the "rock" signifies the truth that Jesus is God, "Peter" signifies faith in God, and the "keys of the kingdom of heaven" signify the faith that allows one to enter heaven. Divine providence gave the Catholic Church spiritual dominion, since it helped spread the gospel and prevented the Christian church from being destroyed by Arianism or Socinianism.

Catholics who do not read scripture worship externally only, to prevent the scriptures from being profaned. New Church adherents believe that Catholics who have avoided idolatry, worshiped God alone and done good works can receive spiritual truth from scripture more easily.

==== Protestantism ====
Although the Protestant churches have broken away from the Catholic Church and rejected many of its traditions, their basic theology remains the same. Catholics and Protestants agree on the belief in the trinity, original sin, and justification by faith; the main difference is that the Protestants believe that faith alone saves, without acts of charity. The reformers separated faith from charity to separate completely from the Catholic Church.

In the New Church, good works must be done with the acknowledgment that good originates from God and not from self. The Protestant separation of faith and good works is derived from an epistle by Paul the Apostle saying that humanity is justified by faith, without "works of the law" (Romans 3:28). New Church adherents consider this is a false interpretation, for by "works of the law" Paul meant the external rituals of Mosaic law (not the Ten Commandments or acts of charity).

There is no instantaneous salvation by paying lip service to a belief in Christ. A person acquires a nature according to their works, and must repent for their sins by refusing to do evil. "The faith of the former church is, that repentance, remission of sins, renewal, regeneration, sanctification, and salvation, follow of themselves the faith that is given and imputed, without any thing of man being mingled or joined with them: but the faith of the New Church teaches repentance, reformation, regeneration, and thus remission of sins, with man's cooperation. The faith of the former church teaches the imputation of Christ's merit, and the imputation embraced in the faith that is given: but the faith of the New Church teaches the imputation of good and evil, and at the same time of faith, and that this imputation is according to the Sacred Scripture, while the other is contrary to it." Some Protestant churches (including the New Church) have withdrawn from the doctrine of faith alone: "The Word is read by them, and the Lord is worshipped, and hence with them there is the greatest light; and spiritual light, which is from the Lord as the Sun, which in its essence is Divine love, proceeds and extends itself in every direction, and enlightens even those who are in the circumferences round about, and opens the faculty of understanding truths, so far as they can receive them in accordance with their religion."

=== Socinianism and Arianism ===
In Socinianism, Jesus' divinity is denied. Arianism is similar, believing that Jesus was a created being. Both are considered heretical by the New Church, which believes that the divine human is the means by which humanity is saved; since all those who are in heaven are in his presence, Christians who deny Jesus' divinity go to hell. However, this does not apply to those who have been born and lived outside Christianity. According to New Church revelation, many Christians are Socinian at heart and deny that Jesus is divine; this derives from a trinitarian doctrine, from dividing Christ into two natures, and from calling Jesus merely the son of Mary.

=== Islam ===
The New Church considers Islam to have been established by divine providence to eliminate idolatry. The New Church considers it a partial (or introductory) revelation; Islam worships one God, teaches one to live well and shun evil and teaches that Jesus was a great prophet and the son of the virgin Mary, but not the son of God (as in Christianity). The Quran contains teachings from sacred scripture.

The church believes that Islam is a religion adapted to societies that practice polygamy. Since polygamy is an opposite love from monogamous marriage, and a marriage between a husband and wife corresponds to the marriage of God and the church, spiritual matters were not revealed in Islam. It is regarded differently from Socinianism or Arianism because only Christians can profane what is holy by distorting scripture; non-Christians, such as Muslims, cannot. Muslims oppose any Trinitarian Christian church. The New Church believes that Muslims may enter heaven, but only those who reject polygamy can learn the true nature of God.

== Criticism ==
Swedenborg stated that he had distributed his books to English bishops and nobility, who considered them well-written but of little value and advised against reading them. Some members of other Christian denominations have criticised the church's denial of a trinity and Jesus' atonement. The New Church believes that there is one God in Jesus, and some Christian theologians classify the church as a cult.

Others reject Swedenborg's visions. Walter Ralston Martin quoted a critic that Swedenborg's spiritual experiences "were admittedly of such a character, that in an ordinary man they would have sufficed to qualify him for an asylum." According to Martin, however, his theological writings were so systematic that "no one can reasonably say that Swedenborg was insane": "Swedenborg was a rationalist, and paradoxically, a mystic. He was one who absorbed the introspective and subjective philosophy of Rene Descartes, and the empiricism of John Locke, which he combined with the transcendentalism of lmmanuel Kant, thus forming a mold into which Christian theology was poured, and what would not go into the mold (selected Old Testament works, the Pauline epistles, Acts, James, Peter, Jude, etc.), he simply discarded. What emerged was a deeply speculative philosophical system of theology, couched in a redefined Christian terminology, and buttressed with mystical visions, trances, and dreams."

The earliest assessment of Swedenborg came from contemporary German philosopher Immanuel Kant. Swedenborg was relatively unknown until 1759, when a fire broke out in Stockholm and threatened to burn down his house and his writings. At a dinner in Gothenburg, 480 kilometres (300 mi) away, he reportedly turned pale and described to the guests exactly what was happening until the fire was put out (three houses away from his house). This was investigated by Kant, who wrote Dreams of a Spirit-Seer criticising Swedenborg and knowledge derived from dreams and visions. Kant wrote in letters that he privately admired Swedenborg, but did not publicly admit it in fear of ridicule.

Swedenborg stated that all teachings came to him from the Lord while reading scripture in a full waking state, and although allowed to converse with angels and spirits to give an account of the afterlife all doctrinal teachings were received from Jesus alone. Religious critics disagree, saying that he received his information from evil spirits and his revelations are "among the most antibiblical and anti-Christian material ever printed." According to Martin, Swedenborg "was apparently well aware of the fact that Pauline theology, if accepted at face value, would vitiate almost en toto his own. So he began with the basic assumption that he was right, and that the apostle Paul was wrong! In some of his visions and dreams, he stated that he actually argued with Paul, Luther, Calvin, and others. And, as ego triumphed, these great thinkers all retreated before Swedenborg's new revelations. However, one factor must never be forgotten, and that is the statement that the New Testament is the criterion for measuring all subsequent revelations, and whatever is found to be contrary to it, must be and always has been, rejected by the Christian church."

Christians emphasise that in distinguishing an evil spirit from an angel, angels must glorify Jesus and teachings must be based on scripture. New Church adherents say that Swedenborg would agree, since he said no evil spirit can utter the name of Jesus; it signifies salvation, and those in the spiritual world speak as they think. Unlike many spiritualists, Swedenborg praises Jesus as the God of heaven and earth and his doctrines are derived from scriptural references. According to Swedenborg, none of the teachings originated from an angel or spirit and the spiritual world was revealed to him so humanity would know that there is life after death: "When I think of what I am about to write and while I am writing, I enjoy a complete inspiration, for otherwise it would be my own; but now I know for certain that what I write is the living truth of God." "That the Lord manifested Himself before me His servant, and sent me to this office, and that He afterward opened the sight of my spirit, and so has admitted me into the spiritual world, and has granted to me to see the heavens and the hells, also to converse with angels and spirits, and this now continuously for many years, I testify in truth; likewise, that from the first day of that call I have not received any thing which pertains to the doctrines of that church from any angel, but from the Lord alone while I read the Word."

Critics note that Swedenborg viewed only 36 books in the Bible as divinely inspired. According to them, masquerading as a being of light is a demonic tactic; Swedenborg's allegorical, esoteric interpretations and paranormal encounters contradict the scriptures and make his claims spurious. This criticism ignores the fact that the majority of Swedenborg's writings are based on direct scriptural quotations with numerous cross references. As for the writings of Paul, Swedenborg clarified the distinction between the epistles of Paul with the rest of scripture in his private diary: "Paul indeed spoke from inspiration, but not in the same way as the prophets, to whom every single word was dictated but that his inspiration was that he received an influx, according to those things which were with him, which is quite a different inspiration, and has no conjunction with heaven by correspondences."

== Influence ==
=== Transcendentalism ===
Notable American Transcendentalist Ralph Waldo Emerson spoke highly of Swedenborg in his writings. Historians Perry Miller and Arthur Versluis regard Swedenborg as a pervasive influence on the Transcendentalist worldview.

=== Mormonism ===
D. Michael Quinn suggests that Joseph Smith, the first president and prophet of The Church of Jesus Christ of Latter-Day Saints, was influenced by Swedenborg's writings. Like Swedenborg, members of the Church believe in eternal marriage. However, they require that the ritual be performed in a temple by one having authority given from God. Smith's concept of three heavens is similar to Swedenborg's view. Both Swedenborg and Smith refer to heaven as "celestial", similar to Paul's (see 2 Corinthians 12:2) description of a visit to the "third heaven". Edward Hunter (a Swedenborgian who became a member of the Church) reported that in 1839 Joseph Smith told him that he was familiar with Swedenborg's writings.

=== New Thought ===
New Thought, a spiritual movement that began in the United States during the late 19th century, promotes positive thinking and healing. Phineas Quimby, a healer who said that illness in the body originated in false beliefs, was an early proponent. Quimby healed Warren Felt Evans, a Swedenborgian minister who became a healer and published several books promoting New Thought in New Church doctrines. According to Swedenborg, there is a correspondence from heaven with all things on earth.

=== Psychology ===
Carl Jung, founder of analytical psychology and a contemporary of Sigmund Freud, was familiar with Swedenborg's works. He cited Swedenborg's reported clairvoyance about the 1759 Stockholm fire as an example of synchronicity: "When [...] the vision arose in Swedenborg's mind of a fire in Stockholm, there was a real fire raging there at the same time, without there being any demonstrable or even thinkable connection between the two".

=== Notable figures with Swedenborgian connections ===
- William Blake: His The Marriage of Heaven and Hell satirised Swedenborg's Heaven and Hell. Blake and his wife, Catherine, attended the first General Conference of the New Jerusalem Church in 1789. Blake was influenced by an earlier version of the New Church. His doctrine, however, later evolved.
- Daniel Burnham: American architect and urban designer. His parents were Swedenborgians.
- Robert Carter III (1728–1804): A planter from the Northern Neck of Virginia, "Virginia's first emancipator," was influenced by Swedenborg's views
- Johnny Appleseed (John Chapman): American missionary and pioneer who planted apple trees throughout the midwestern United States
- Robert Frost: American poet who was baptised in the church
- Leonard Gyllenhaal: Entomologist and Swedenborgian, an ancestor of American actors Jake Gyllenhaal and Maggie Gyllenhaal
- Stephen Gyllenhaal: Descendant of Leonard, who was raised Swedenborgian
- William Harbutt: Inventor of plasticine
- George Inness: American landscape painter
- Helen Keller: Wrote Light in My Darkness, which advocated Swedenborg's ideals
- James Tyler Kent: late-19th-century American homeopathic physician who incorporated Swedenborgian principles into the homoeopathic theory of disease, as described in his Lectures on Homeopathic Philosophy
- George Lauder, Sr.: Scottish educator and political leader for the Chartist cause. Father to George Lauder and uncle to Andrew Carnegie, mentor to both.
- Lucius Lyon (1800–1851): American statesman
- William Rainey Marshall (1825–1896): Fifth governor of Minnesota and advocate for African-American suffrage
- Lisa Oz (b. 1963), author and television personality
- Mehmet Oz (b. 1960): Influenced by Swedenborg
- Isaac Pitman (1813–1897): Inventor of shorthand and member of the New Jerusalem church in Bath, England
- Arthur Sewall (1835–1900): Democratic candidate for vice-president in the 1896 US presidential election
- Ernest George Trobridge (1884–1942): architect and developer active in domestic architecture during the first half of the 20th century, particularly in London's northwestern suburbs
- Lois Wilson (1891–1988): founder of Al-Anon, who was raised Swedenborgian

== See also ==
- Bible Christian Church (vegetarian)
- Bryn Athyn College
- Glencairn Museum
- Henry James Sr.
- Daniil Andreev
