= General Church of the New Jerusalem =

Church based in Bryn Athyn, Pennsylvania

The General Church of the New Jerusalem
- Classification: Restorationist
- Orientation: Swedenborgian
- Polity: Episcopal
- Headquarters: Bryn Athyn, Pennsylvania; 40.135890°N 75.069100°W
- Origin: 1897
- Separated from: The General Convention of the Church of the New Jerusalem
- Members: 6,760 (in 2006)
- Official website: Official website

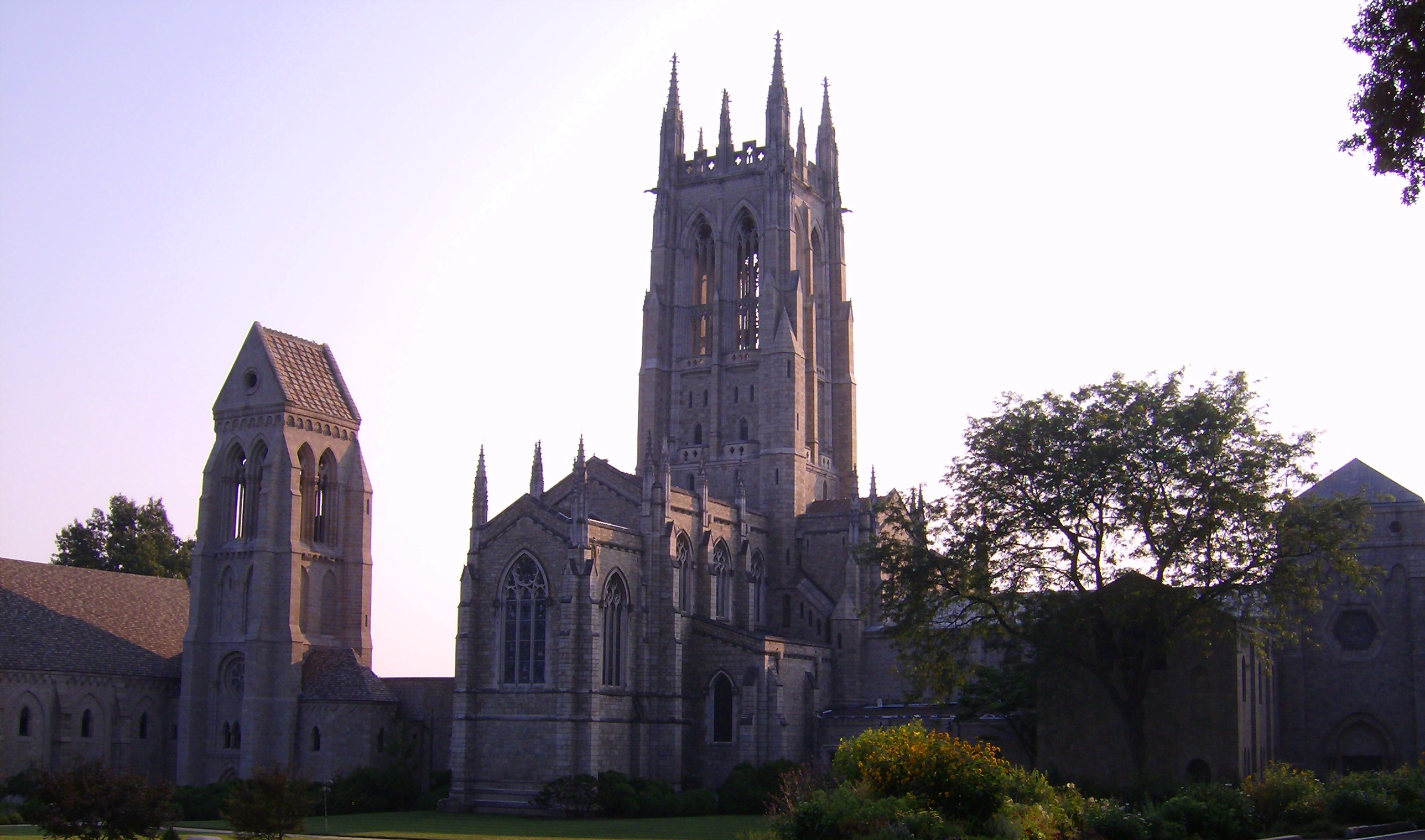
Bryn Athyn Cathedral

The General Church of the New Jerusalem (also referred to as the General Church or just simply the New Church) is an international church based in Bryn Athyn, Pennsylvania, and based on the Old Testament, the New Testament, and the theological works of Emanuel Swedenborg (often called the Writings for the New Church or just the Writings). The General Church of the New Jerusalem distinguishes itself from other Swedenborgian churches by teaching that the Writings for the New Church are the Heavenly Doctrine revealed by the Lord in His Second Coming and have authority equal to the Old and New Testaments. It is larger, newer, and more conservative than the Swedenborgian Church of North America.

== History ==
In 1890, as a result of a doctrinal disagreement, the General Church broke away from the General Convention of the Church of the New Jerusalem, also known as the Swedenborgian Church of North America, which had itself been established in 1817. In 1999, the General Church had about 5,600 members, and the General Convention had about 2,600 members. By 2006, membership in the General Church had increased to 6,760.

== Doctrine ==
The General Church of the New Jerusalem accepts the doctrine of the New Church as described in the works published by Emanuel Swedenborg. The following doctrine can be drawn from and verified by these works. Among these works are True Christian Religion, Heaven and Hell, Conjugial Love, The New Jerusalem and its Heavenly Doctrine, Heavenly Secrets, The Doctrine of the Lord, and many more. In these works the doctrine of The New Church is defined.

- The Creator of the Universe (Jehovah) came into this world, taking on the form of Jesus Christ (Immanuel, "God with us") in order to combat the real Hell humanity had created, redeem humankind from Hell's growing and overwhelming influence, permanently restore His connection with humankind, and by His Divinely Human life show people the path to spiritual freedom.
  - He struggled against every evil that humanity encounters in the corrupted will by allowing the evils of Hell to attack Him on the battleground of His Human form, overcoming evil in every instance, and making His Human form One with His uniquely Divine Soul, even as to the flesh and bones. Jesus Christ, thus, entirely became the One God through a process of removing the natural human imperfections and uniting His Divine Soul with His Human form.
  - The New Church has been seen as a proponent of Monarchianism; it does not, however, see God as appearing in three modes. God is seen as One Divine Person, Jesus Christ, who has a Divine Soul of Love, Divine Mind of Truth, and Divine Body of Energy. It is believed that unlike Arianism this doctrine retains both the Unity of God, as well as the full Divinity of Christ, and thus that it is not necessary to split God into a Trinity of persons.
- Following Him is seen as the only loving and rational choice one can make, since He is the One Source of all love and truth. If one is learning truth or doing good, it is from Him, whether it is consciously known or not.
  - His direct instruction is found in the Word of the Old and New Testament, and the Word of His Second Coming, written through Emanuel Swedenborg, who was prepared mentally and spiritually by the Lord to receive the Revelation of the Lord's Holy Spirit, which reveals the answers to the mysteries of faith, leads into all truth, and speaks of the Father plainly.
- Every one of us can become angels if we choose to stop doing evil actions and allow the Lord's presence to grow within us. All angels in Heaven and Devils in Hell were once people on earth.
- The Lord created us all to go to heaven, but He does not make anyone go there. We freely choose our eternal destiny.
  - People of all faiths come into heaven if they have followed their beliefs sincerely and loved God and their neighbors. A person is seen as responsible for their reaction to the truth when it is made known to them. Those who love evil tend to choose to reject the truth, whereas those who love good choose to receive it openly.
  - Those who go to Hell have chosen Hell because they enjoy Hellish delights, which in Hell are only allowed to be enjoyed as fantasy.
- The spiritual marriage of one man and woman does not end with death but continues in heaven to eternity. There, the two remain male and female as to form, and become one angel as to their soul. As a couple they live a life of useful service in the Lord's Heavenly Kingdom, which is perfected to eternity.
- This earth and all of nature is part of the Lord's Kingdom, and in nature we can see the Love and Wisdom of the Lord manifested, but not apart from written revelation.
- Much of the Bible is believed to have not only a literal sense, but a spiritual sense as well, which work together by means of correspondence (theology). In other words, the Bible is seen as a kind of spiritual allegory, which uses words as symbols that each point to a particular spiritual form or concept. On the deepest level the Bible is seen as a story of the Lord's internal life as it was when He was on earth.
- Members of the New Church believe the One God, Jesus Christ is the author of the Word of the Second Coming, not Swedenborg. Swedenborg was merely an instrument of the Lord, as he himself stated.
  - The New Church is not seen as a denomination of Christianity, but rather, the True Christianity, which the Lord has come to establish by means of His Holy Spirit, which leads into all truth.

== Affiliated schools ==
Preschool education (ages 3–5)

- Bryn Athyn Church Preschool, Bryn Athyn, Pennsylvania, USA
- Carmel New Church School, Kitchener, Ontario, Canada (junior kindergarten)
- Glenview New Church Preschool, Glenview, Illinois, USA
- Impaphala New Church Preschool, Eshowe, Natal, RSA
- Kainon Pre-primary School, Westville, Natal, RSA
- The New Church Preschool of the Diepkloof Society, Diepkloof, Gauteng, RSA
- Oak Arbor Church School, Rochester, Michigan, USA (pre K)
- Olivet New Church School, Etobicoke, Ontario, Canada (pre K)
- Pittsburgh New Church School, Pittsburgh, Pennsylvania, USA (pre K)
- New Church School Tema, Tema, Ghana (pre primary grades)

Elementary education (ages 6–14)

- Bryn Athyn Church School, Bryn Athyn, Pennsylvania, USA
- Carmel New Church School, Caryndale, Ontario, Canada
- Glenview New Church School, Glenview, Illinois, USA
- Kainon School, Westville, Natal, South Africa
- Kempton New Church School, Kempton, Pennsylvania, USA
- Oak Arbor School, Rochester, Michigan, USA
- New Church Preparatory School, Asakraka, Ghana
- New Church School Tema, Tema, Ghana
- Olivet New Church School, Etobicoke, Ontario, Canada
- Pittsburgh New Church School, Pittsburgh, Pennsylvania, USA
- Riunde New Church School, Kisii, Kenya
- Washington New Church School, Mitchellville, Maryland, USA

Secondary education (ages 14–18)

- The Academy of the New Church Boys School, Bryn Athyn, Pennsylvania, USA
- The Academy of the New Church Girls School, Bryn Athyn, Pennsylvania, USA
- Carmel New Church Secondary School, Caryndale, Ontario, Canada
- Kempton New Church School, Kempton, Pennsylvania, USA
- Midwestern Academy, Glenview, Illinois, USA

Higher education

- Bryn Athyn College of the New Church, Bryn Athyn, Pennsylvania, USA
- Academy of the New Church Theological School, Bryn Athyn, Pennsylvania, USA
- Academy of the New Church Asia Missionary Course, Bryn Athyn, Pennsylvania, USA
- Korea New Church Theological School
- New Jerusalem Theological Institute, Abidjan, Côte d'Ivoire
- South African Theological School

Other organizations

- British Academy Summer School
- Colchester New Church
- New Church Education Society

== Executive Bishops ==
- William Frederic Pendleton (1845–1927): In office as of February 6, 1897.
- Nathaniel Dandridge Pendleton (1865–1937): In office from June 15, 1916 to June 21, 1936.
- George deCharms (1889–1988): In office from June 30, 1937 to June 16, 1962
- Willard Dandridge Pendleton (1908–1998): In office from June 16, 1962 to June 8, 1976
- Louis Blair King (1925–2010): In office from June 8, 1976 to July 1, 1991
- Peter Martin Buss Sr. (1940– ): In office from July 1, 1991 to 2004.
- Thomas Leroy Kline (1948– ) In office 2004–2013.
- Brian Keith (1951–): In office 2013–2019
- Peter Martin Buss Jr. (1967– ): In office from 2019 to present

== See also ==
- Bryn Athyn Cathedral
- Bryn Athyn College
- Colchester New Church
- Emanuel Swedenborg
- New Church Education
- Swedenborgianism
