= Leedom =

Leedom is a surname. Notable people with the surname include:

- Boyd Leedom (1906–1969), American judge
- Edna Leedom (1896–1937), American actress
- Joanne Leedom-Ackerman, American novelist
- John P. Leedom (1847–1895), American politician

== See also ==
- Leedom Estates, Pennsylvania
- David Leedom Farm
