= Taylor Farm =

Taylor Farm may refer to:

in the United States

(by state)

- Ridge Taylor Farm, Nicholasville, Kentucky, listed on the National Register of Historic Places in Jessamine County, Kentucky
- Taylor-Bray Farm, Yarmouth, Massachusetts, listed on the NRHP in Massachusetts
- Taylor Farm (Richlands, North Carolina), listed on the National Register of Historic Places (NRHP) in North Carolina
- Peter Taylor Farmstead, Newtown, Pennsylvania, listed on the National Register of Historic Places in Bucks County, Pennsylvania
- Taylor Farm (Richmond, Virginia), listed on the National Register of Historic Places in Richmond, Virginia

== See also ==
- Taylor Farms, company producing fruits and vegetables
