= Twining Farm =

- U.S. National Register of Historic Places
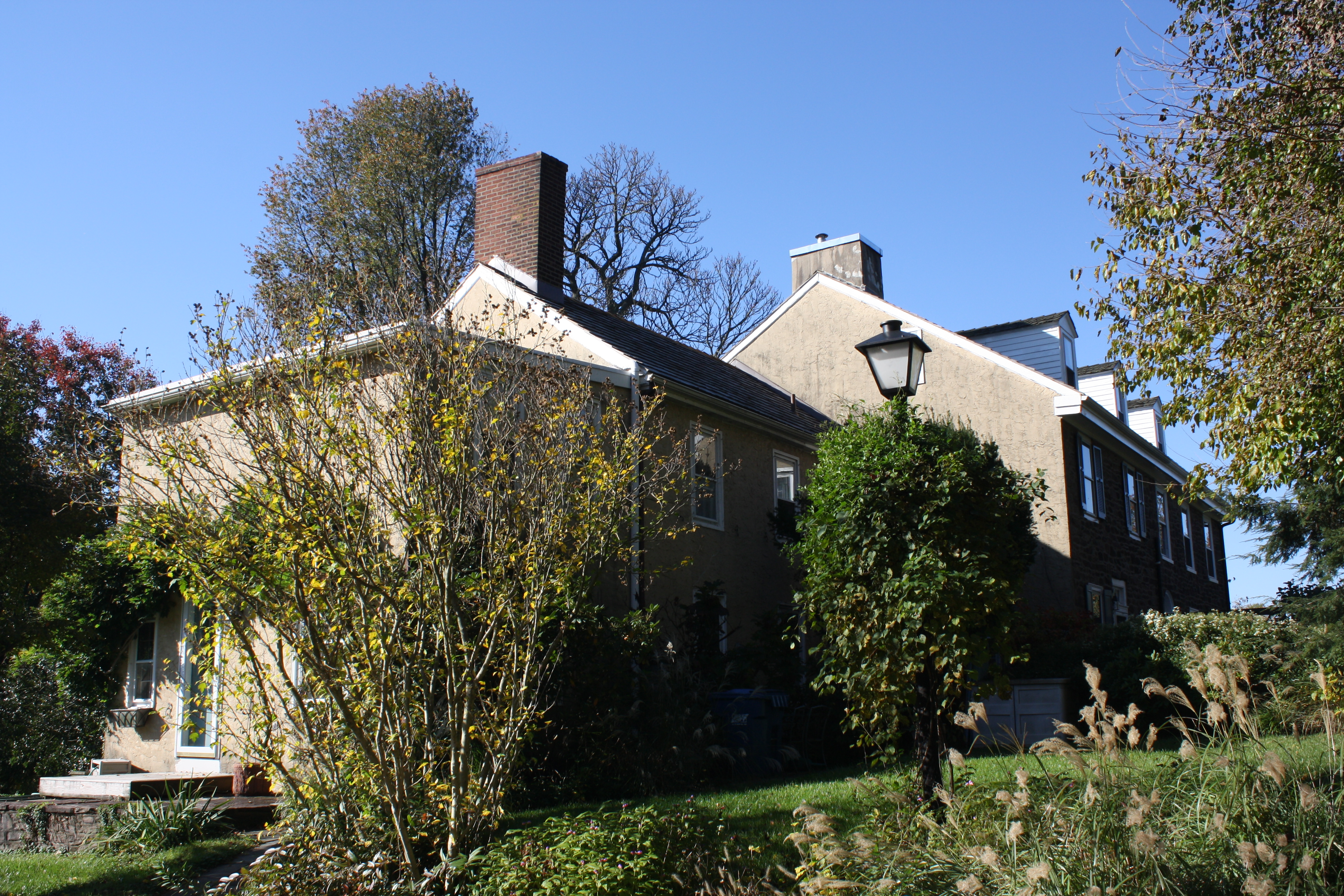
- Twining Farm. October 2012.

- Location within Pennsylvania Location within the United States
- Location: Buck Road, Newtown Township, Pennsylvania
- Coordinates: 40°13′08.6″N 74°56′22.5″W
- Area: 10 acres (4.0 ha)
- Built: 1750
- NRHP reference No.: 82003766
- Added to NRHP: July 1, 1982

The Twining Farm, also known as the David and Elizabeth Twining Farm, is an historic home and farm that are located in Newtown Township, Bucks County, Pennsylvania, United States.

It was added to the National Register of Historic Places in 1982.

== History and architectural features ==
The stone farmhouse was built in two stages, a 2 1/2-story, stone eastern section, with a later three-bay, 2 1/2-story western addition that was erected in 1832. A frame wing and bow window were added about 1940. Also located on the property are a contributing stable, a chicken house, and a bank barn complex. The farm was featured in three of four Newtown farmscape paintings created by noted artist Edward Hicks (1780-1849). Hicks had resided at the farm for ten years as the foster son of Elizabeth and David Twining.

== Gallery ==
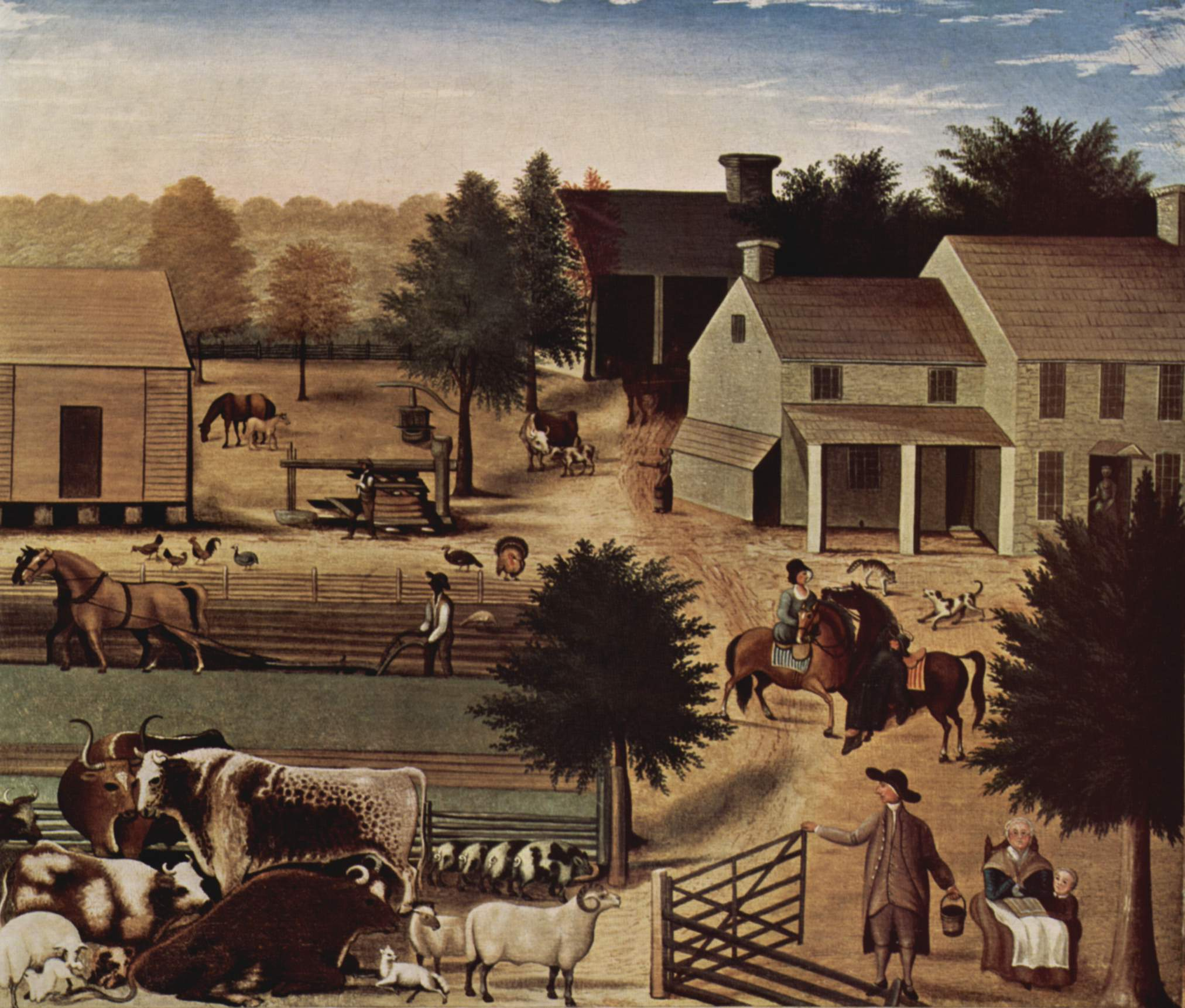
The Residence of David Twining, (1845–1848), Abby Aldrich Rockefeller Folk Art Collection.

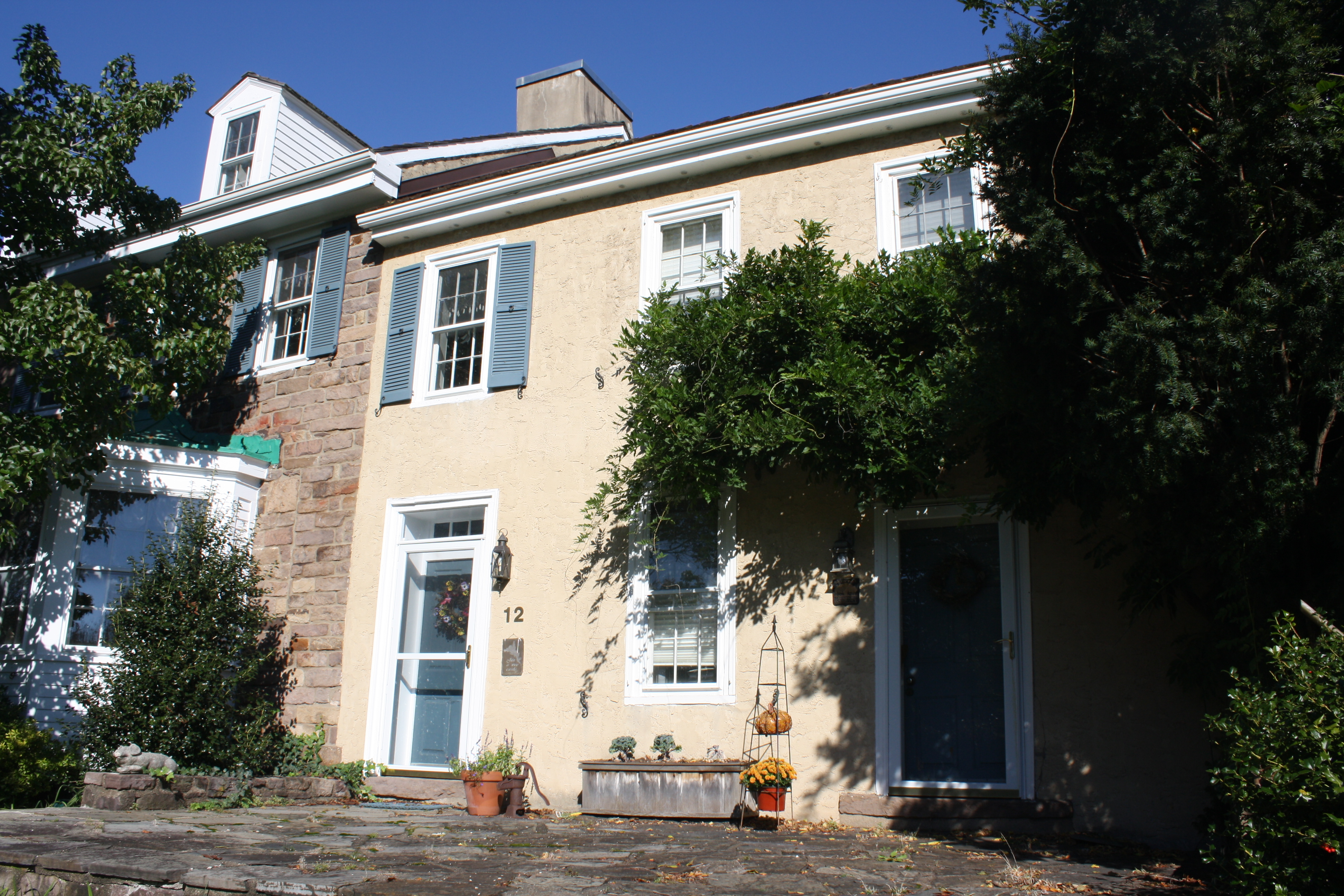
Early eastern section.

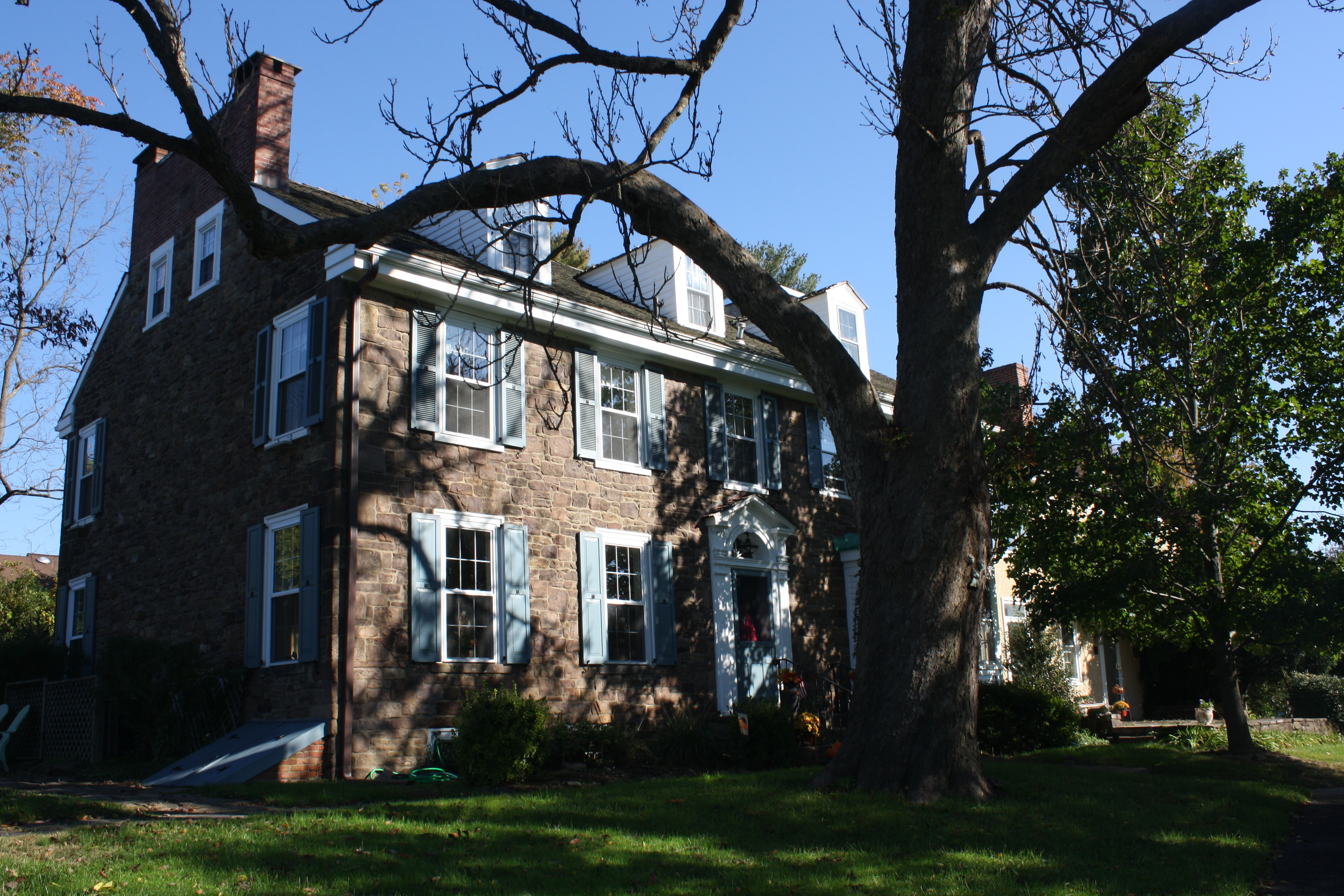
West wing.

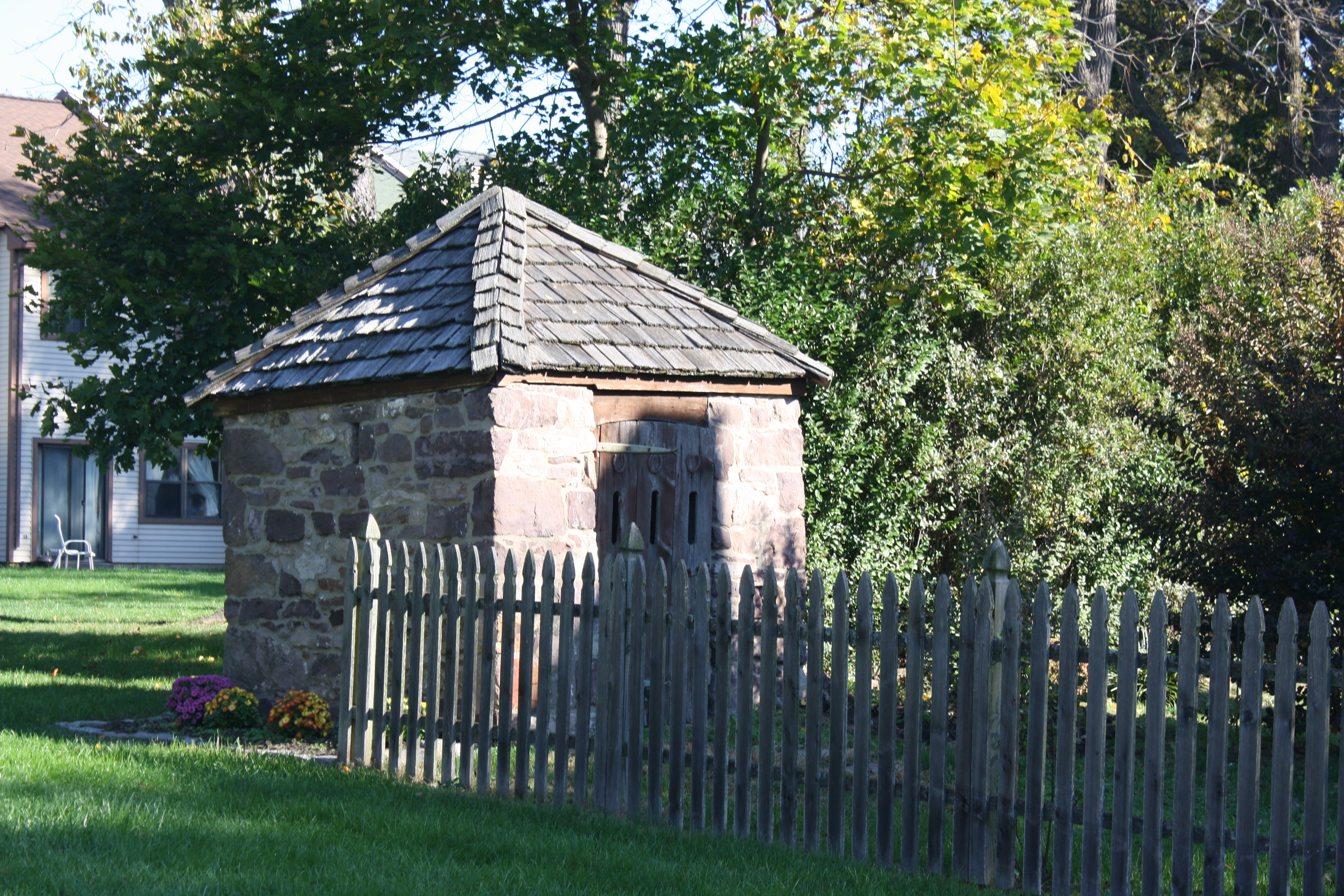
Smoking House.

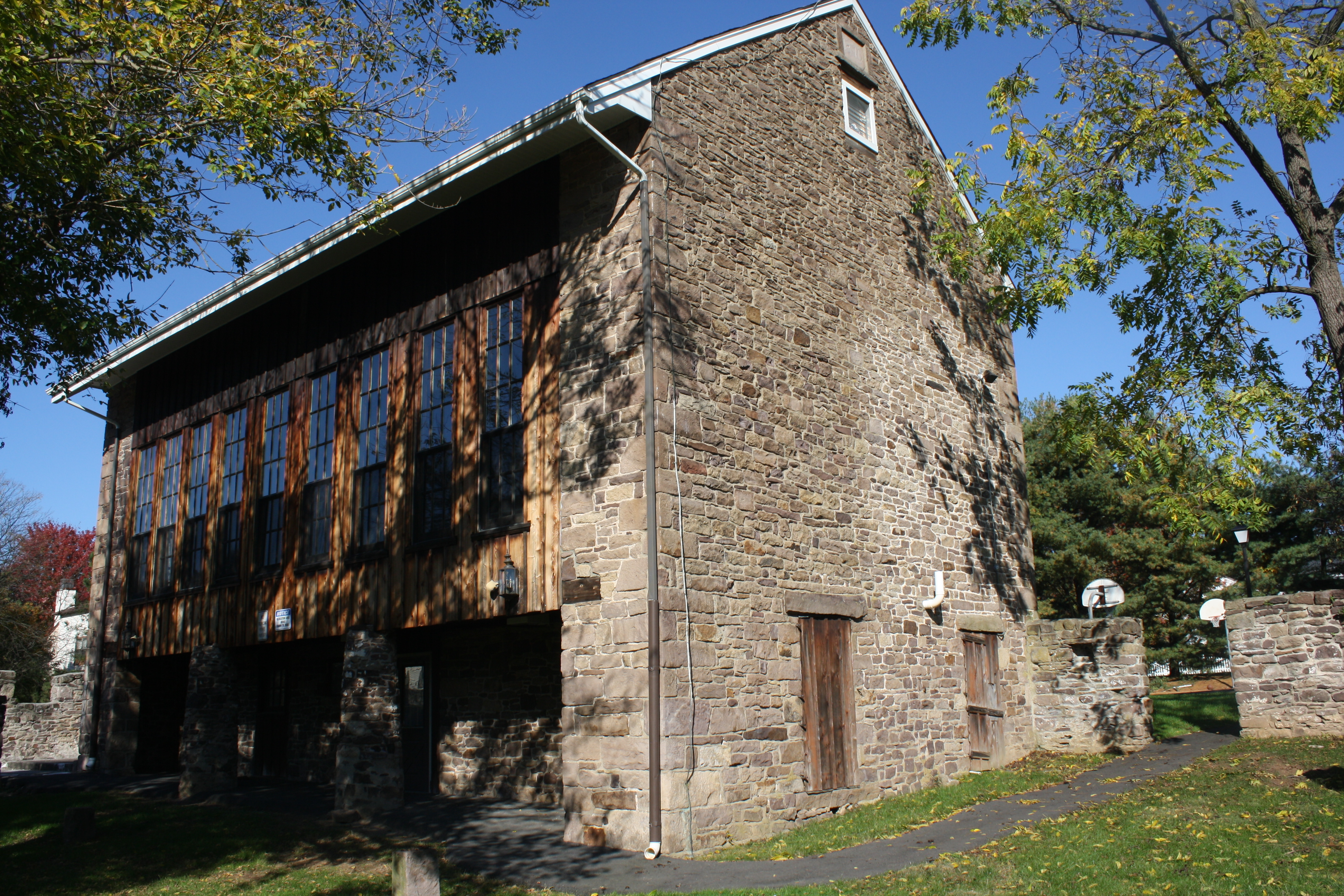
Bank Barn.
