= Deirdre Bolton =

American broadcast journalist, reporter and correspondent

- Born: Newtown, Pennsylvania, U.S.
- Education: University of Iowa, New York University
- Occupations: journalist, news anchor

Deirdre Bolton is a former American television anchor who is a current ABC News correspondent. She previously was the host of Risk & Reward on Fox Business. Bolton lives in New York.

== Biography ==
Deirdre Bolton graduated from the University of Iowa with a degree in English and French literature in 1993. She graduated from Council Rock High School in Bucks County Pennsylvania in 1989. Bolton holds a master's degree from New York University. She is married to Lawrence Lease and has two children.

Bolton formerly anchored Bloomberg Television's Money Moves, a show about alternative investments. She started at Bloomberg in 2009. On January 31, 2014, she left Bloomberg for Fox Business News to host a new business show Risk & Reward. However, Bolton was absent from the show for nearly a year due to an injury she sustained in the summer of 2016 that required a long recovery period.
