= The Falls of Niagara =

Painting by Edward Hicks

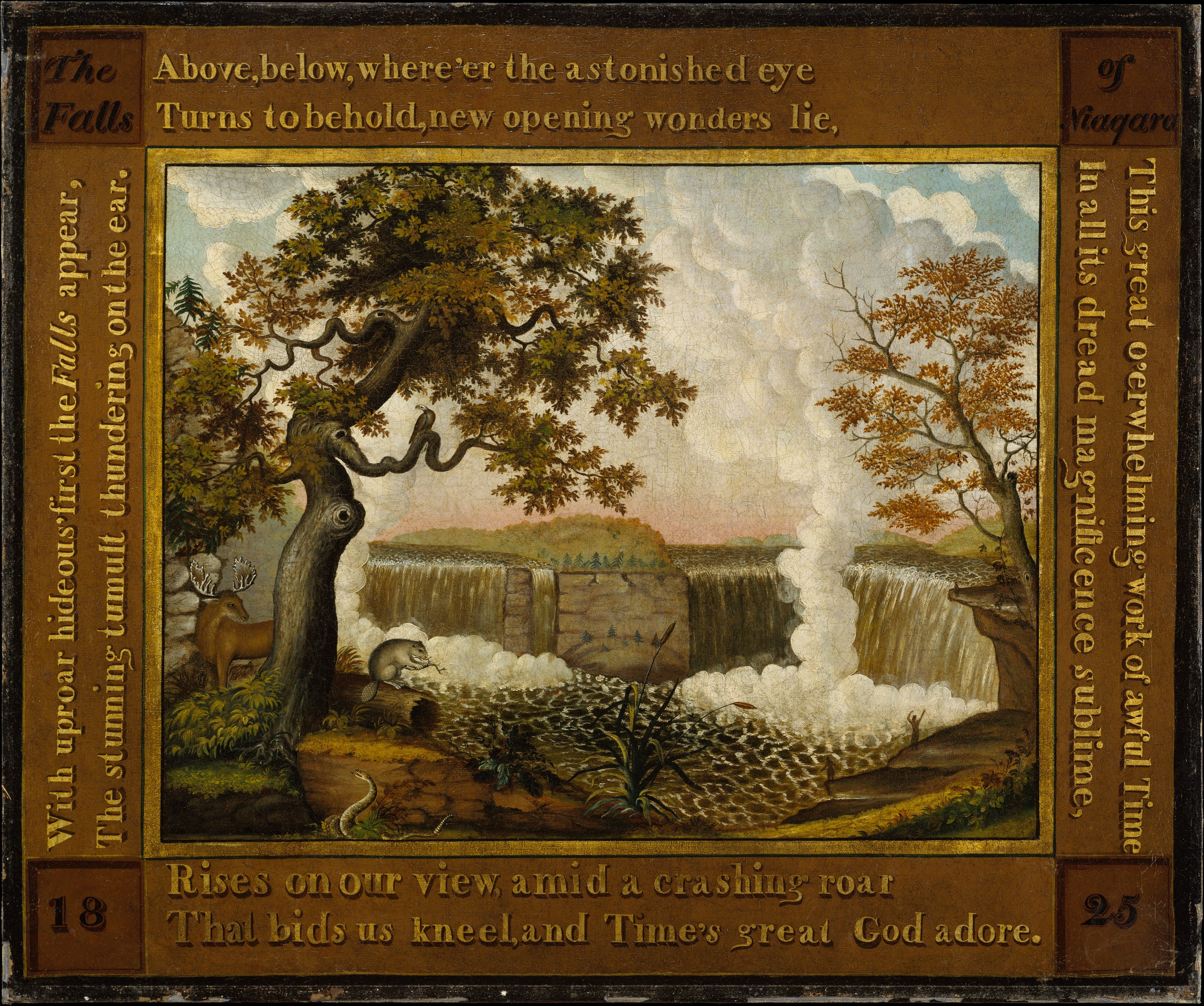
- Artist: Edward Hicks
- Year: c. 1825
- Medium: oil paint, canvas
- Dimensions: 80 cm (31 in) × 96.5 cm (38.0 in)
- Location: Metropolitan Museum of Art
- Accession: 62.256.3

The Falls of Niagara is a c.1825 painting by Edward Hicks. It is part of the collection of the Metropolitan Museum of Art.

Although Hicks had personally visited Niagara Falls in 1819 this picture was based on a previous depiction of the Falls by Henry Schenck Tanner on an 1822 map of North America. The view is from the Canadian side and includes traditional North American images of moose, beaver, rattlesnake and eagle. On the wide border of the picture are inscribed extracts from a poem, The Foresters, by Alexander Wilson. It reads (clockwise from left):

With uproar hideous first the Falls appear
The stunning tumult thundering on the ear.
Above, below, where'er the astonished eye
Turns to behold, new opening wonders lie,
This great overwhelming work of awful Time
In all its dread magnificence sublime
Rises on our view amid a crashing roar
That bids us kneel, and Times great God adore.

== See also ==
- 1825 in art
