= Clark Nature Center =

Place in Pennsylvania, United States

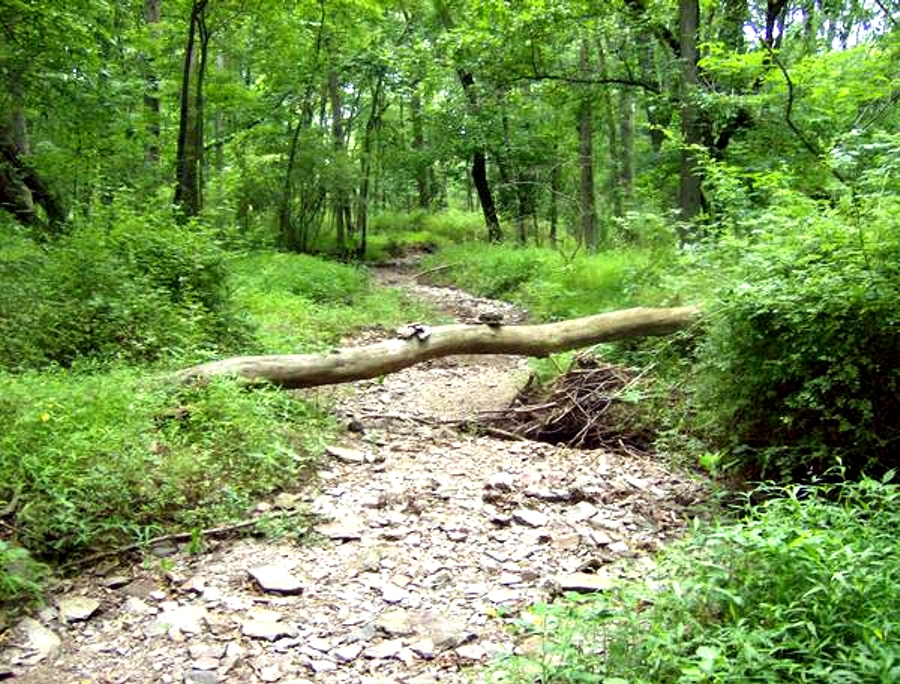
- Dry bed of a seasonal creek in the park

- Location within Pennsylvania
- Location: Newtown Township, Bucks County, Pennsylvania
- Coordinates: 40°13′42″N 74°55′56″W
- Area: 0.079 square miles (0.20 km^{2})
- Elevation: 167 feet (51 m)

Clark Nature Center is a nature trail park within the Newtown Township, Pennsylvania, USA, just off Durham road (Route 413), USA. It was established in 1997, on land originally bought from the Leni Lenape Indians in 1683 by William Penn. The park covers an area of approximately 50.6 acres (20.5 ha), with a mixture of dirt and wood chipped nature trails. Two seasonal creeks run through the park. Park benches have been sited at various view points along the trail. Local wildlife includes wild turkey, deer, and occasionally foxes can be seen.

The Newtown Creek, situated to the west across Swamp road, is a tributary of the Neshaminy Creek, running north to south, is the western boundary between the borough of Newtown and the township of Newtown.

== History ==
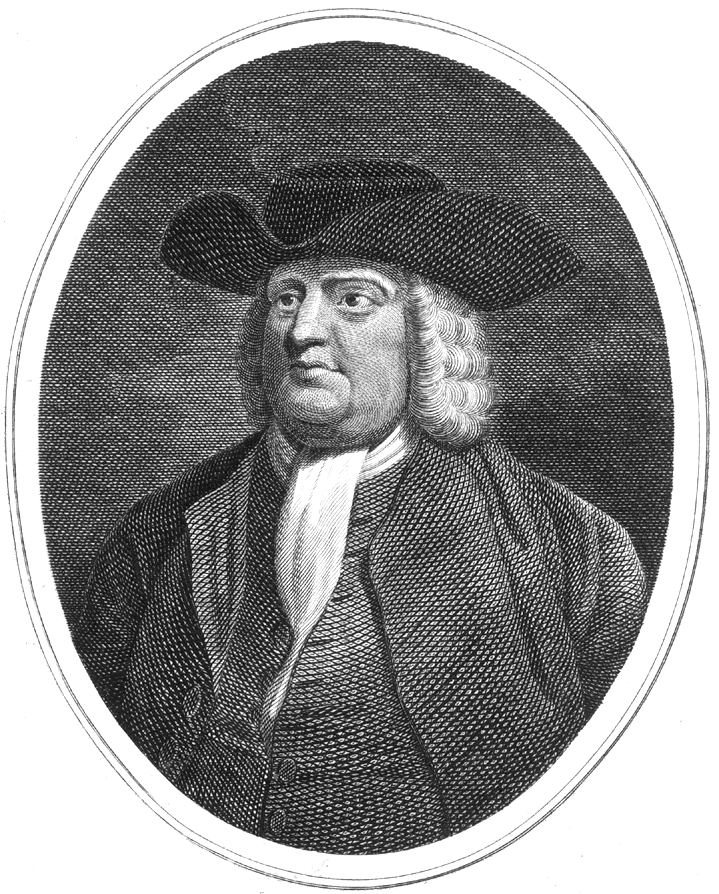
William Penn

A history of the land that comprises the park can be seen on the Park and Recreation website of Newtown Township.

=== Early history ===
- October 27–28, 168) - William Penn conveyed to Christopher Taylor 5,000 acres (2,000 ha), 564 of which in Newtown.
- June 2, 1702 – Israel and Joseph Taylor, sons of Christopher, conveyed 564 acres (228 ha) to Samuel Hough (DB p100). Samuel Hough sold his land in a number of transactions, Northern Portion, Middle Portion, and Southern Portion. The southern land included the lower part of the country lot and the entire town lot of Samuel Hough passed to William Buckman through an unknown conveyance around 1702.
- April 4, 1716 (proved August 26, 1716) - William Buckman, in his will, left his land that he purchased from Samuel Hough to his son William Buckman, Jr.
- 1750 - Buckman, Jr. sold to his son John Buckman
- 1790 - John Buckman willed to his son John Buckman, Jr.
- 1807 - Buckman, Jr. purchased 158 acres (64 ha) from nephew, William Buckman, 4th.
- 1833 - John Buckman, Jr. dies
- 1838 - The estate of John Buckman, Jr. sold 50 acres (20 ha) and 120 perches of land to Stacy Buckman. "It appears that Stacy Buckman built the house that today stands on the property soon after his purchase, and the property remained in his family until 1891. It was given the name Mount Pleasant."
- October 29, 1891 – George B. Buckman and Marianna Hpilborn, executors of the last will and testament of Stacy Buckman sold to Isaac Eyer.
- October 30, 1891 - Isaac Eyer sold to George V. Doan

=== 20th century and onwards ===
- April 1, 1910 - George V. Doan sold to John Lownes
- March 31, 1923 - John Lownes sold to John Mast
- March 27, 1931 – In a sheriffs sale, Cheltenham Building & Loan Association, No. 2 bought the property for US$130.59.
- May 29, 1935 - Cheltenham Building & Loan Association, No. 2 to Lyman Clark for one US dollar.
- July 5, 1935 – Lyman Clark sold to John M. McCoy for one dollar
- July 5, 1935 – John M. McCoy sold to Lyman and Mary Clark for one dollar.
- December, 1997 – Lyman and Mary Clark sold 50.632 acres (20.490 ha) to Newtown Township to be preserved in perpetuity as open space.

== Image gallery ==
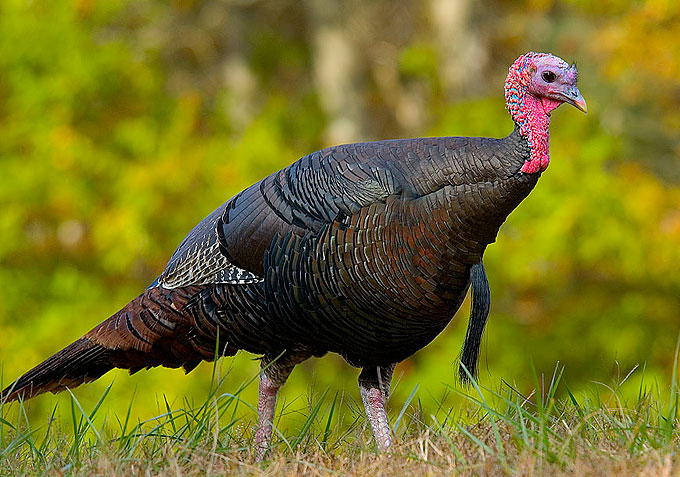
Eastern wild turkey

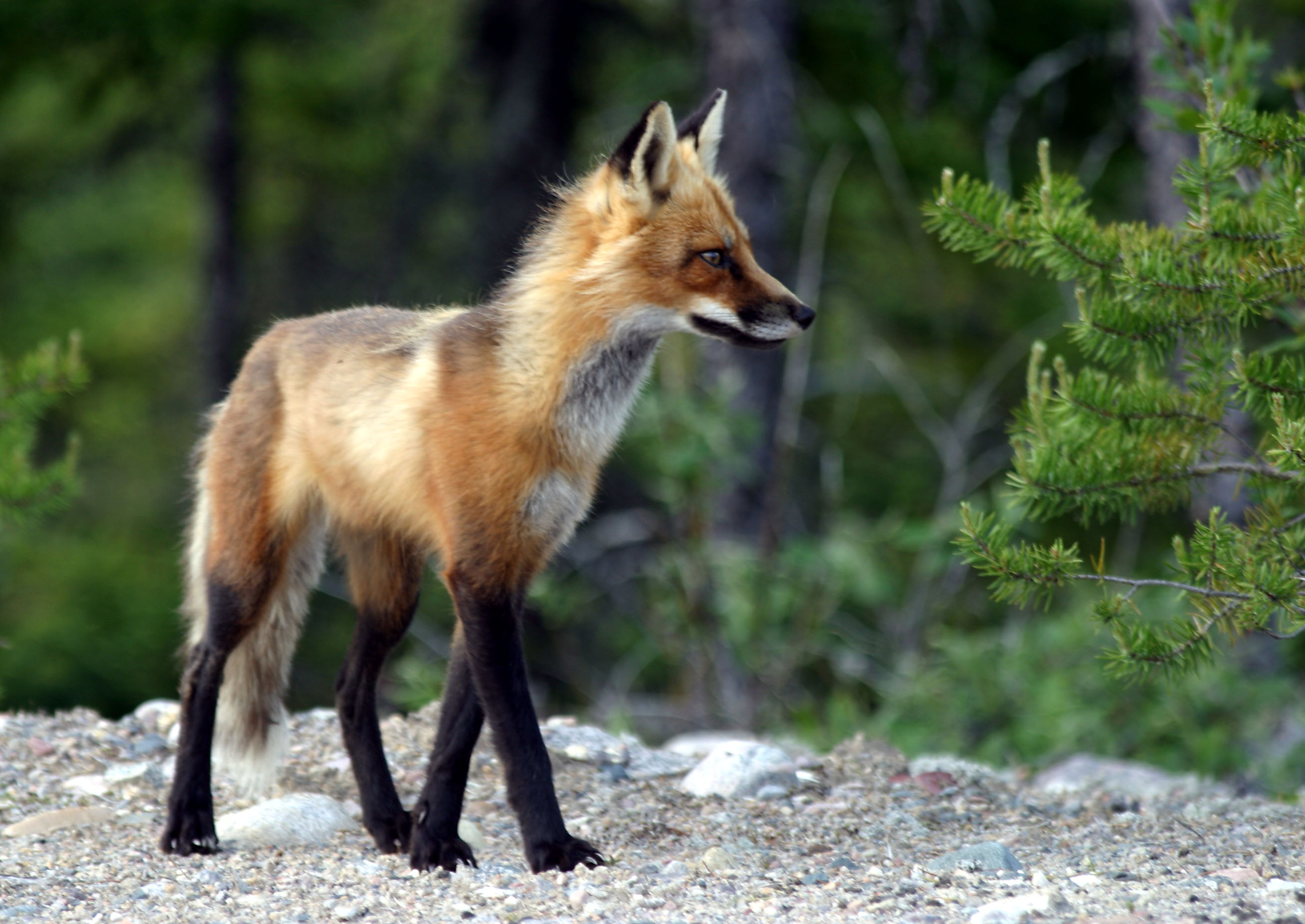
Adult fox

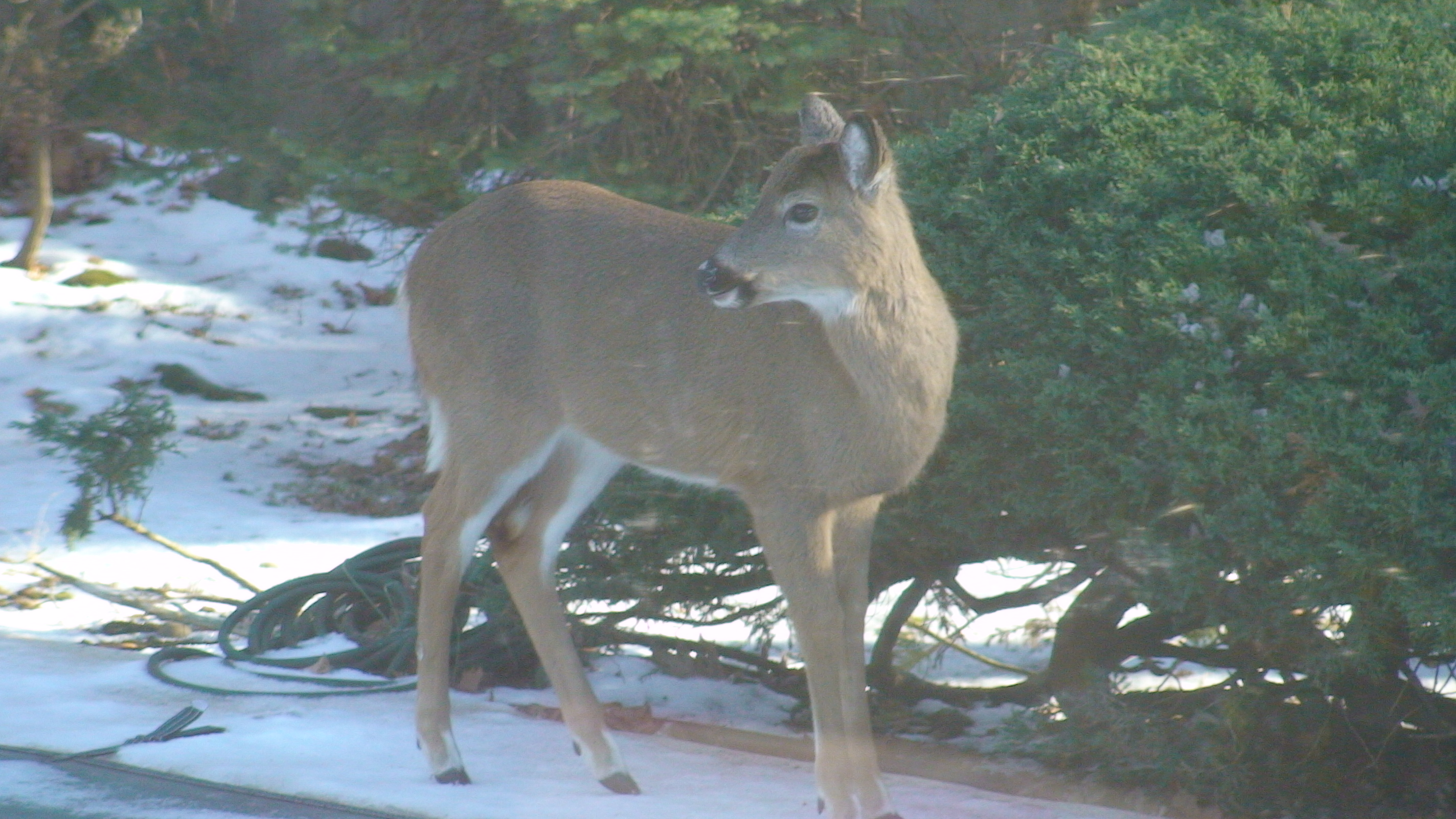
Adult deer

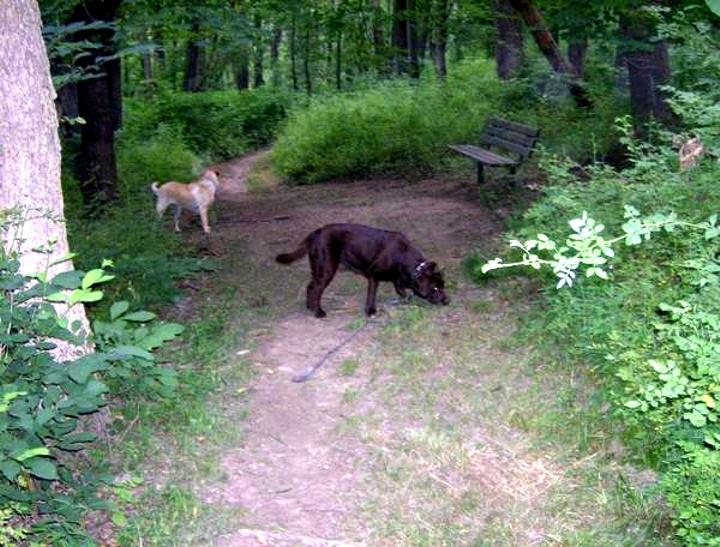
Park benched area

== See also ==
- Tyler State Park (Pennsylvania)
