= David Leedom Farm =

- U.S. National Register of Historic Places
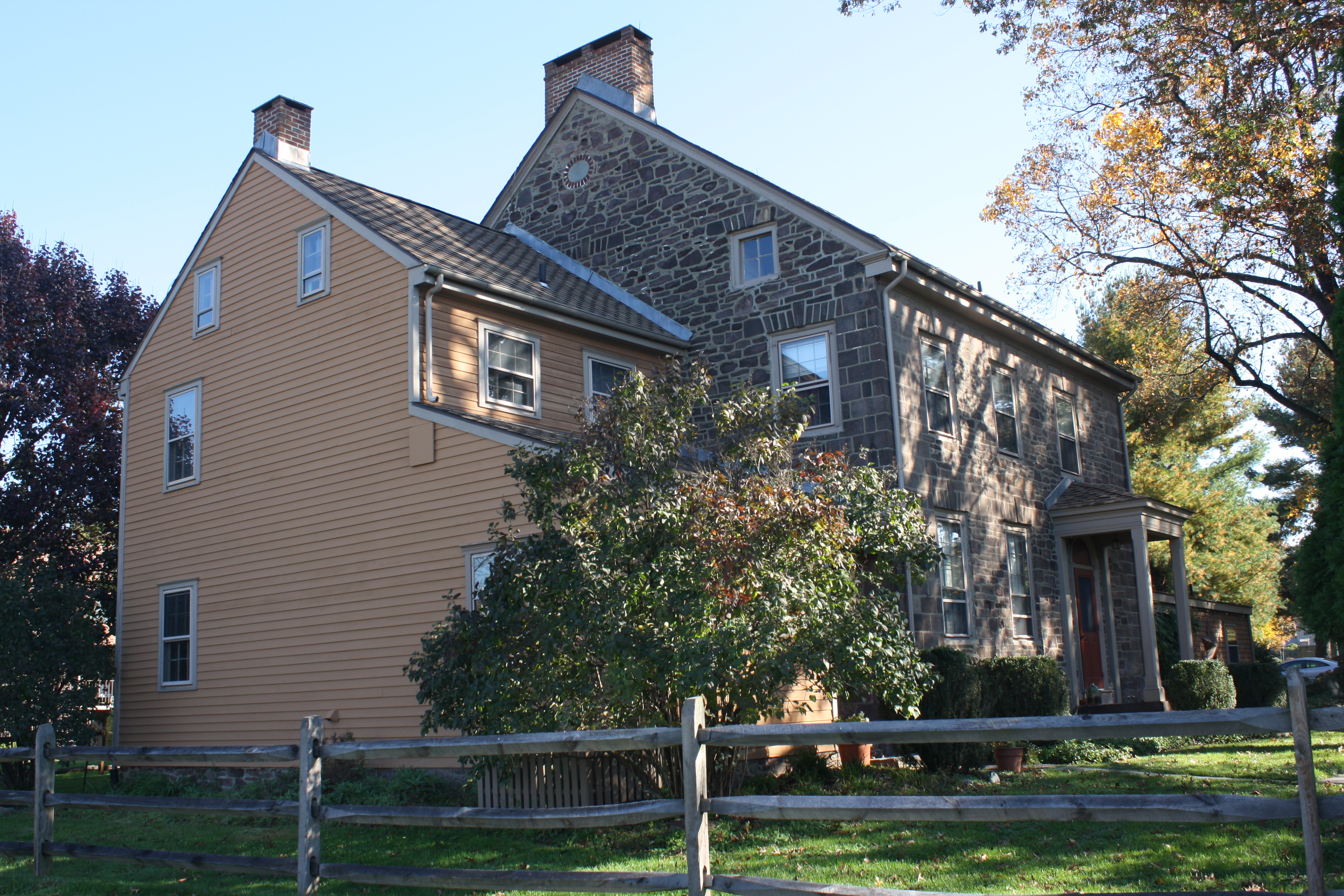
- David Leedom Farm. October 2012.

- Location within Pennsylvania Location within the United States
- Location: Southwest of Newtown off Richboro Road, Newtown Township, Pennsylvania
- Coordinates: 40°13′19″N 74°57′25″W
- Area: 1 acre (0.40 ha)
- Built: 1825
- NRHP reference No.: 76001609
- Added to NRHP: January 1, 1976

David Leedom Farm, also known as Pleasant Retreat, is a historic home and farm located at Newtown Township, Bucks County, Pennsylvania. The house was built in four stages, with the oldest dated to the late 18th century and consisting of a one-story, one roof stone structure. A large, 2 1/2-story stone addition was built in the late-18th century. In 1802, a three-story, stone "mansion" section was added. A two-story, frame addition was built in the early 1800s. The house features a series of piazzas and the interior of the mansion section has a three-story staircase. Also on the property are a variety of contributing farm-related buildings. The house was featured in one of four Newtown farmscape paintings by noted artist Edward Hicks (1780-1849).

It was added to the National Register of Historic Places in 1976.

== Gallery ==
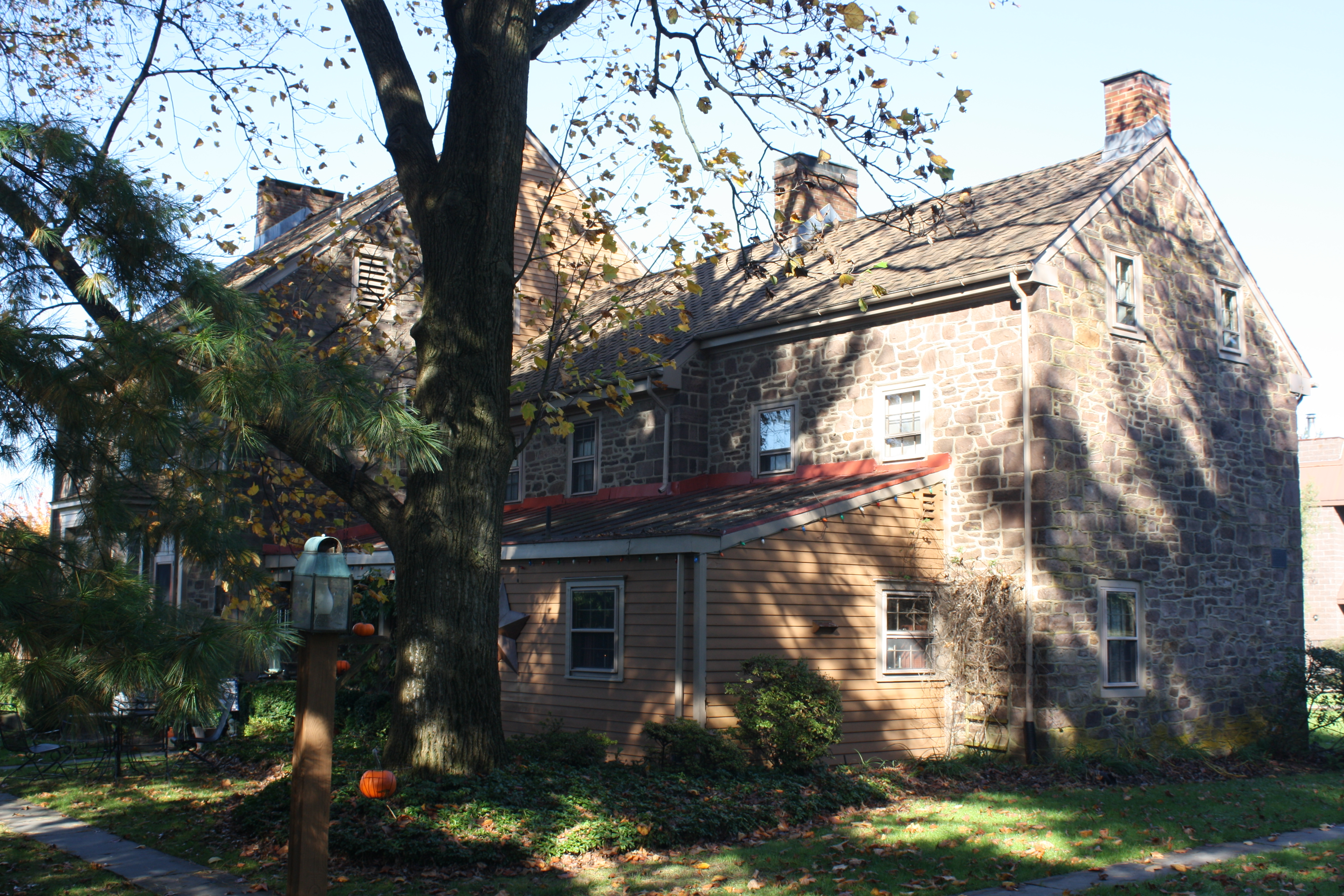

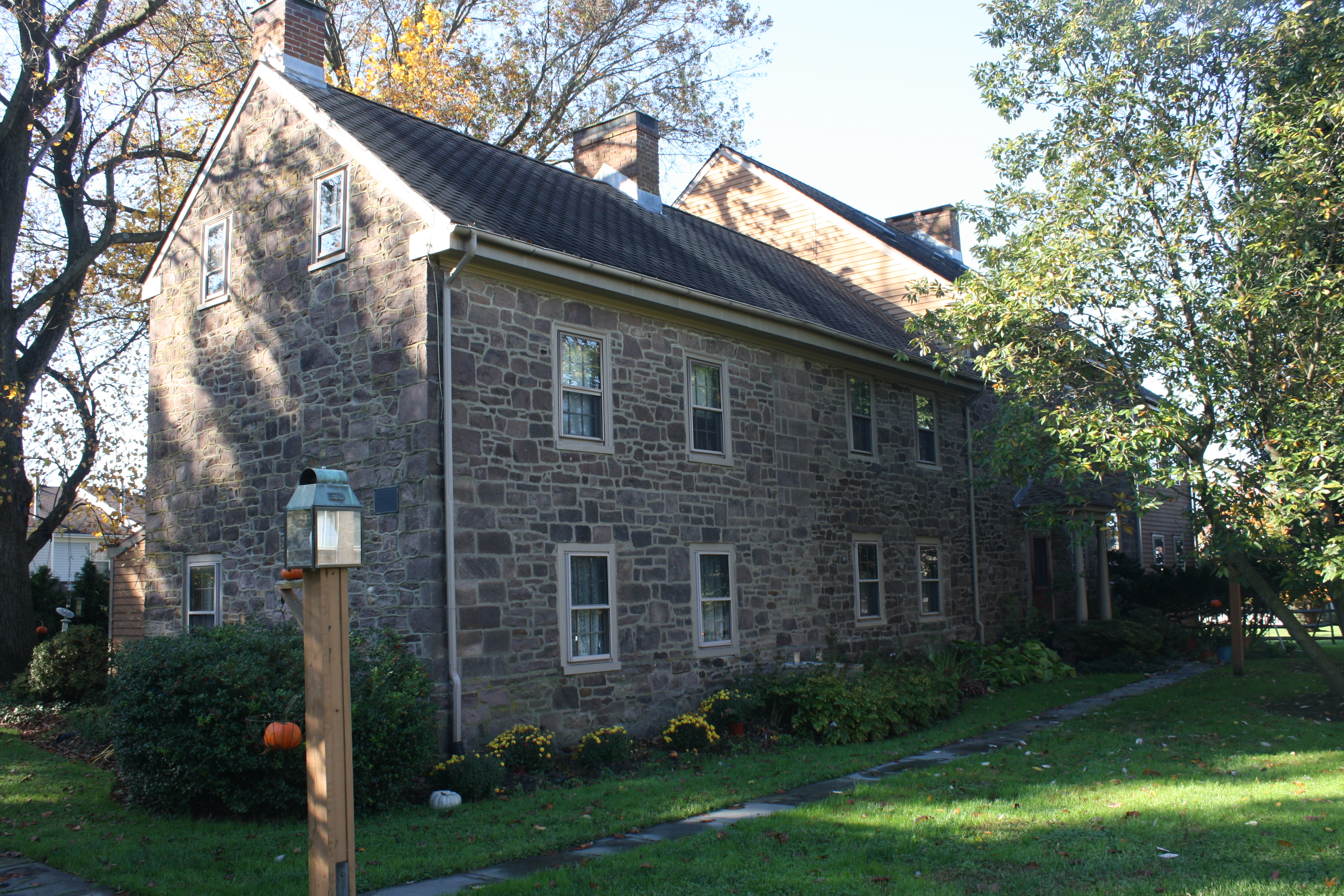

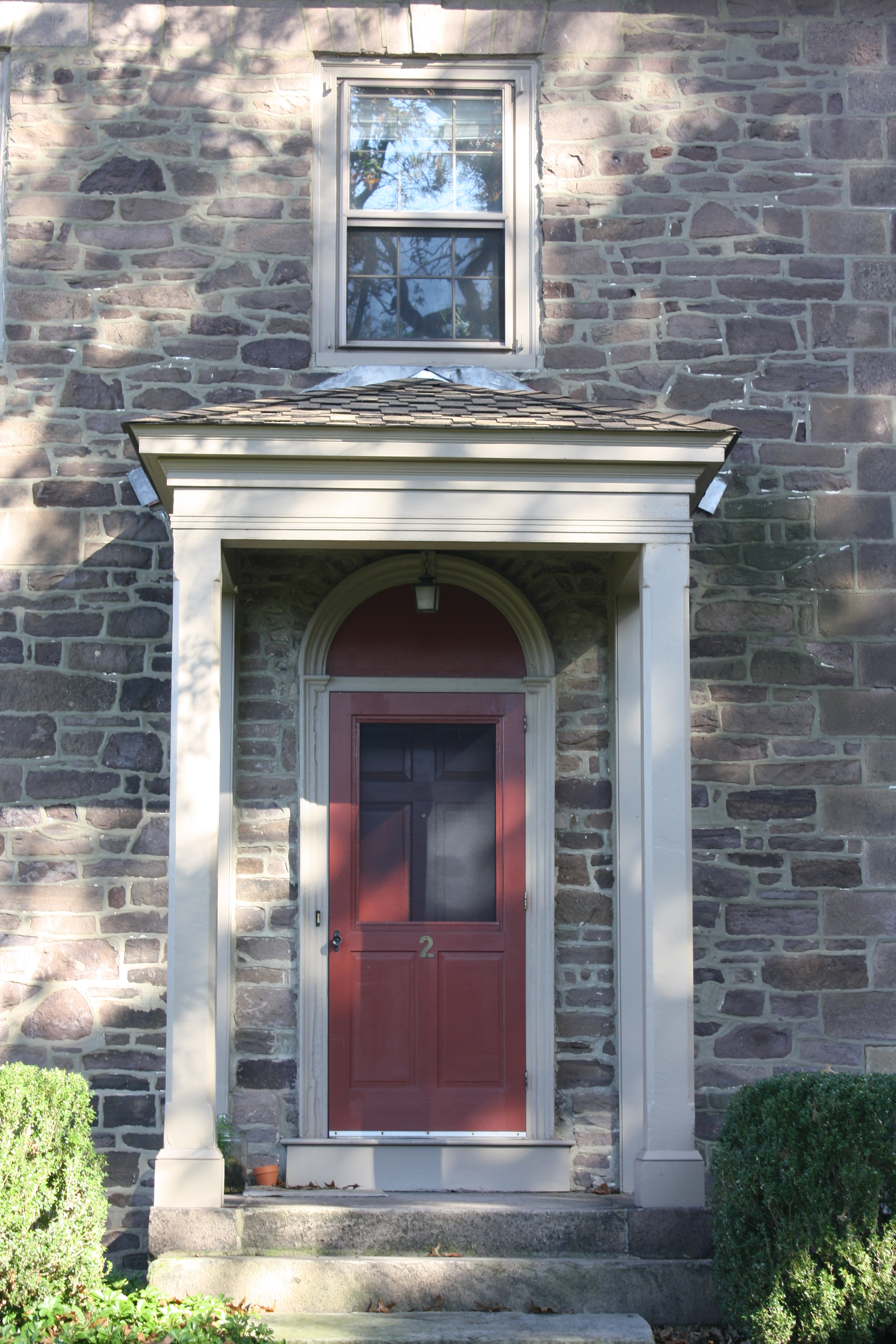
