= Peter Taylor Farmstead =

- U.S. National Register of Historic Places
- U.S. Historic district
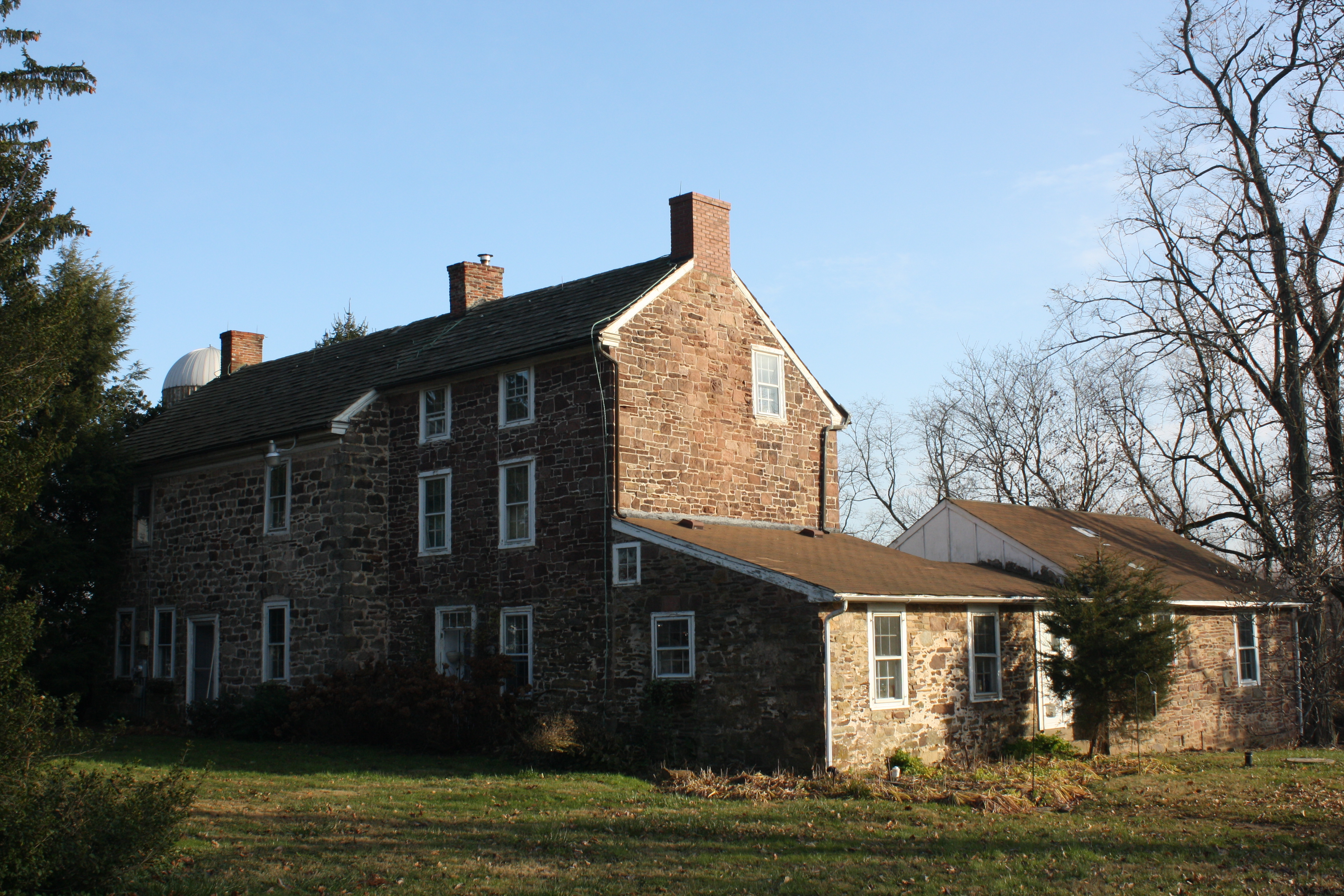
- Peter Taylor Farmhouse. November 2012.

- Location within Pennsylvania Location within the United States
- Location: 229 Wrights Rd., Newtown Township, Pennsylvania
- Coordinates: 40°15′16″N 74°56′7″W
- Area: 3.9 acres (1.6 ha)
- Built: 1750
- Architectural style: Colonial English Farmhouse
- NRHP reference No.: 89000353
- Added to NRHP: May 5, 1989

The Peter Taylor Farmstead, also known as the Shull Farm, is an historic farm and national historic district that is located in Newtown Township, Bucks County, Pennsylvania, United States.

It was added to the National Register of Historic Places in 1989.

== History and architectural features ==
This district encompasses two contributing buildings: the farmhouse and barn. The main section of the two-story, fieldstone farmhouse was built circa 1750. Additions or modifications were then made circa 1800, 1842, 1860, and 1940. The modifications that were done circa 1800 rebuilt the original cabin which dates to 1715. The two and three-story, frame-over-stone, bank barn was built circa 1750 and expanded circa 1860.

== Gallery ==
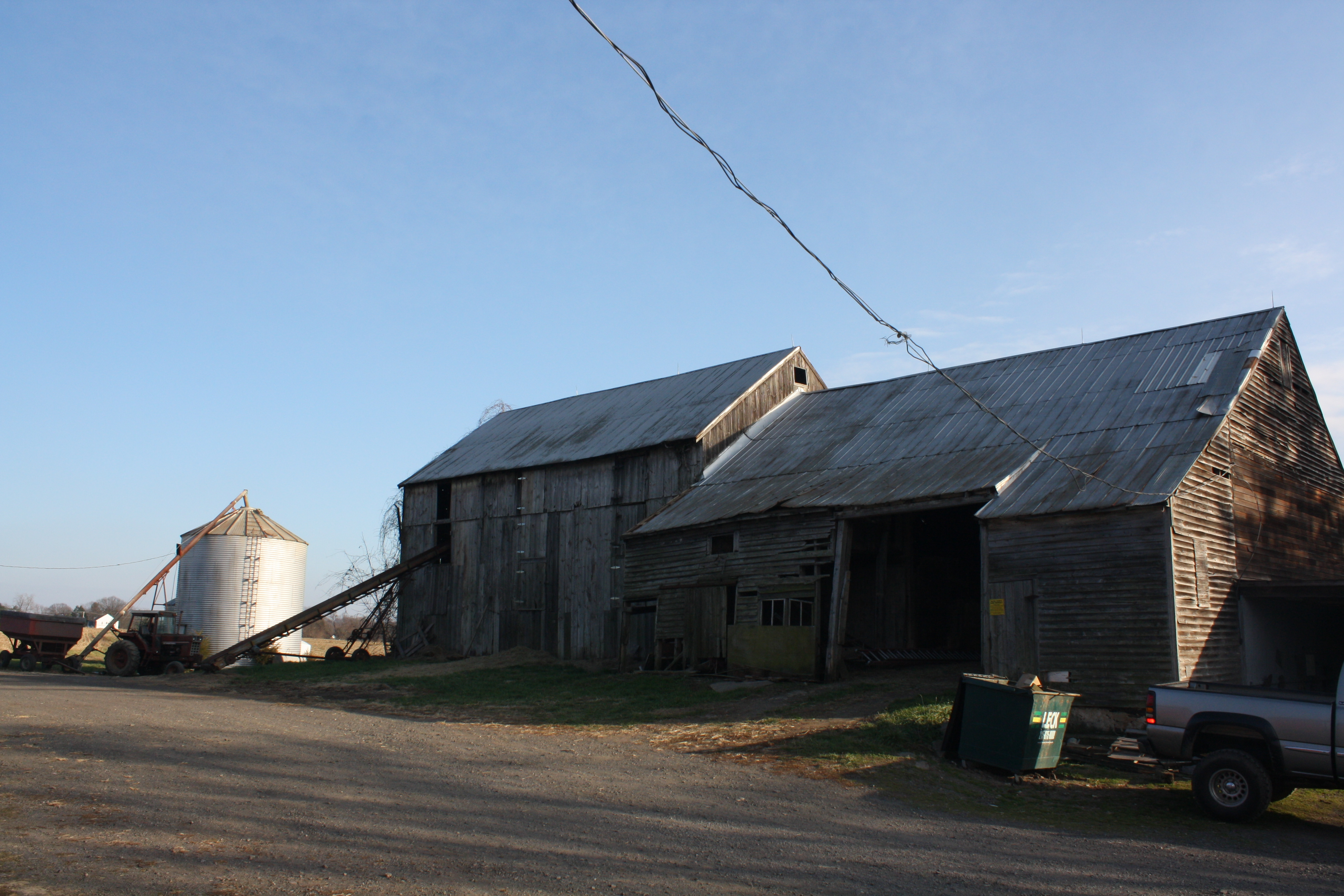
Barn

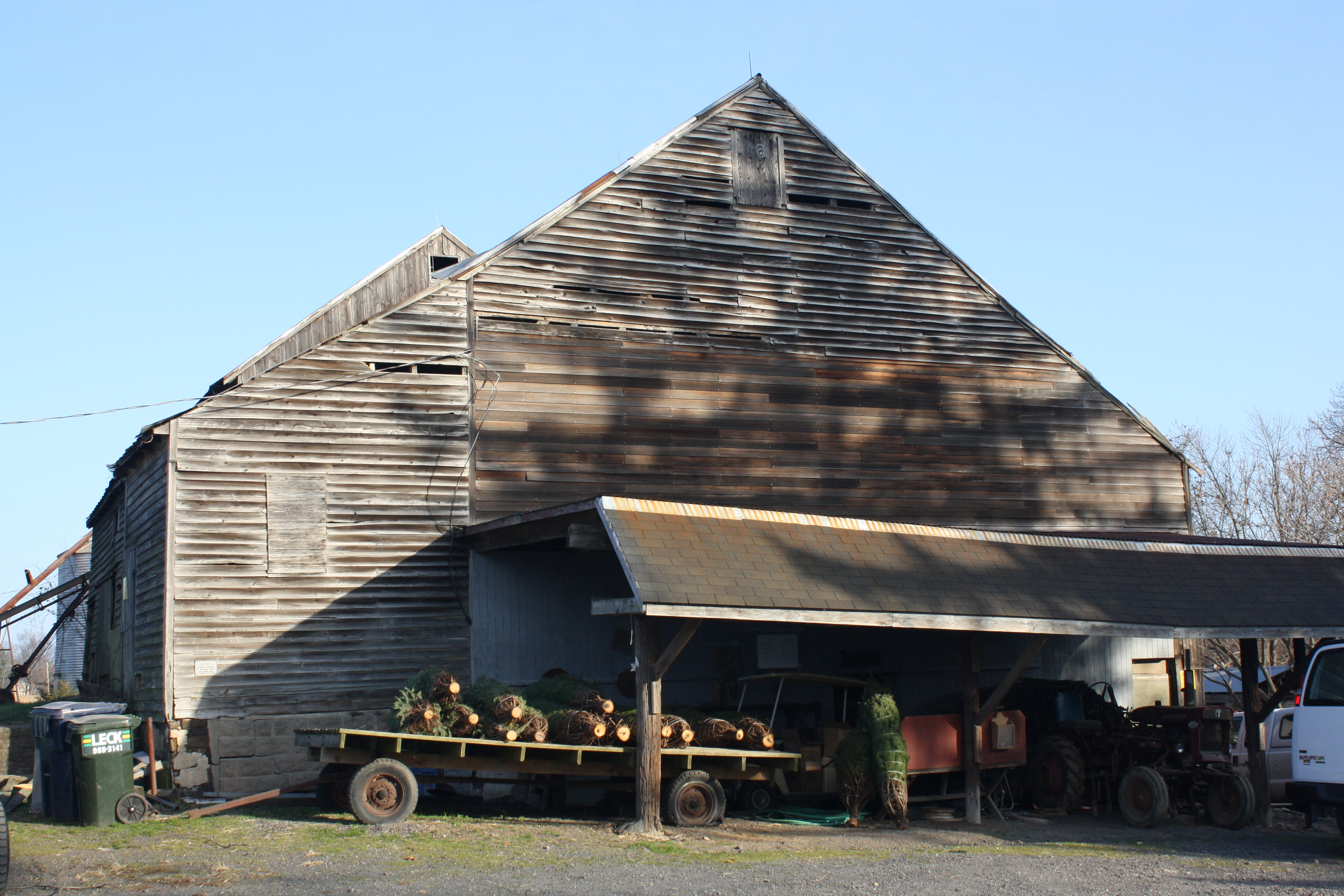
Barn

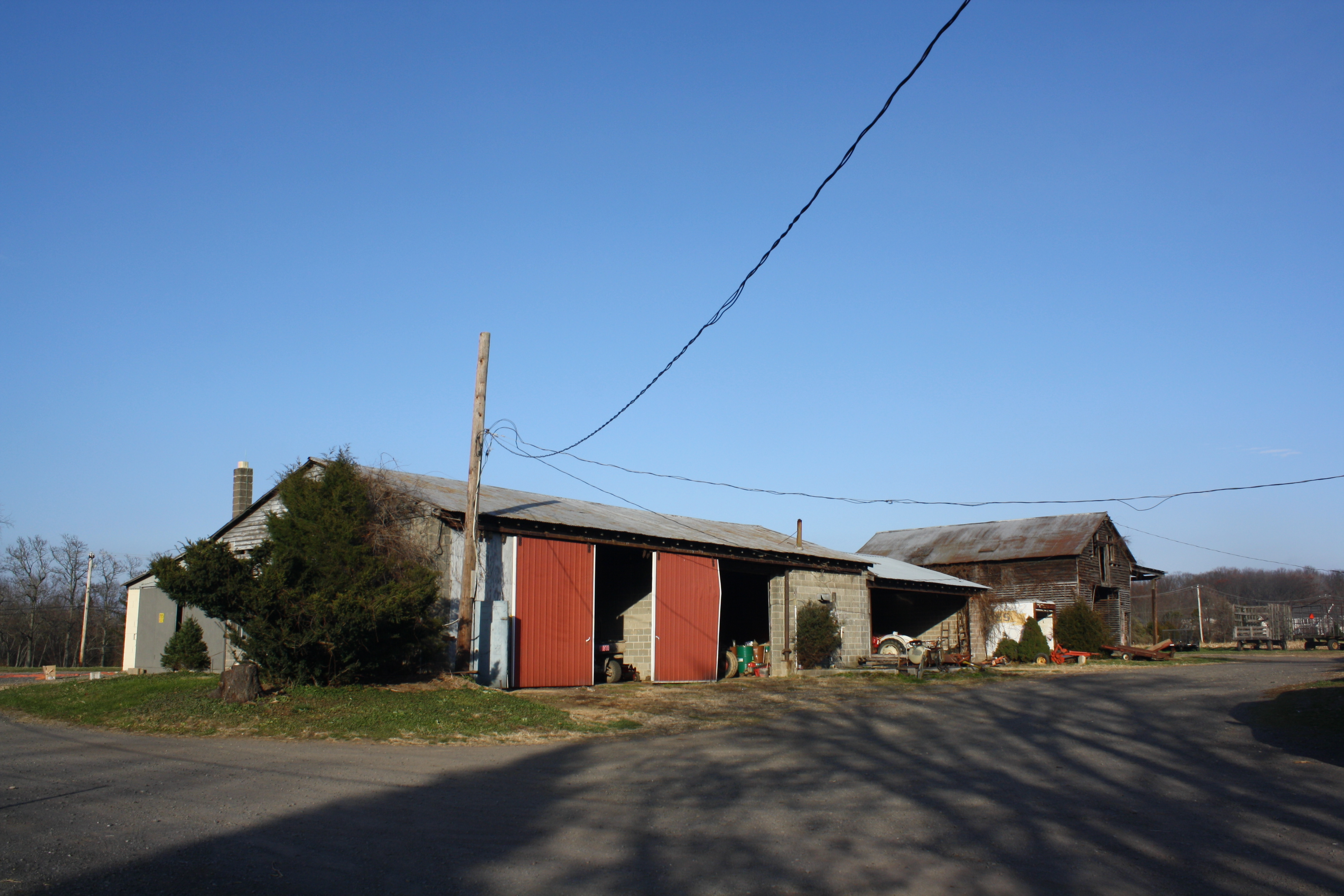
Machine Shed

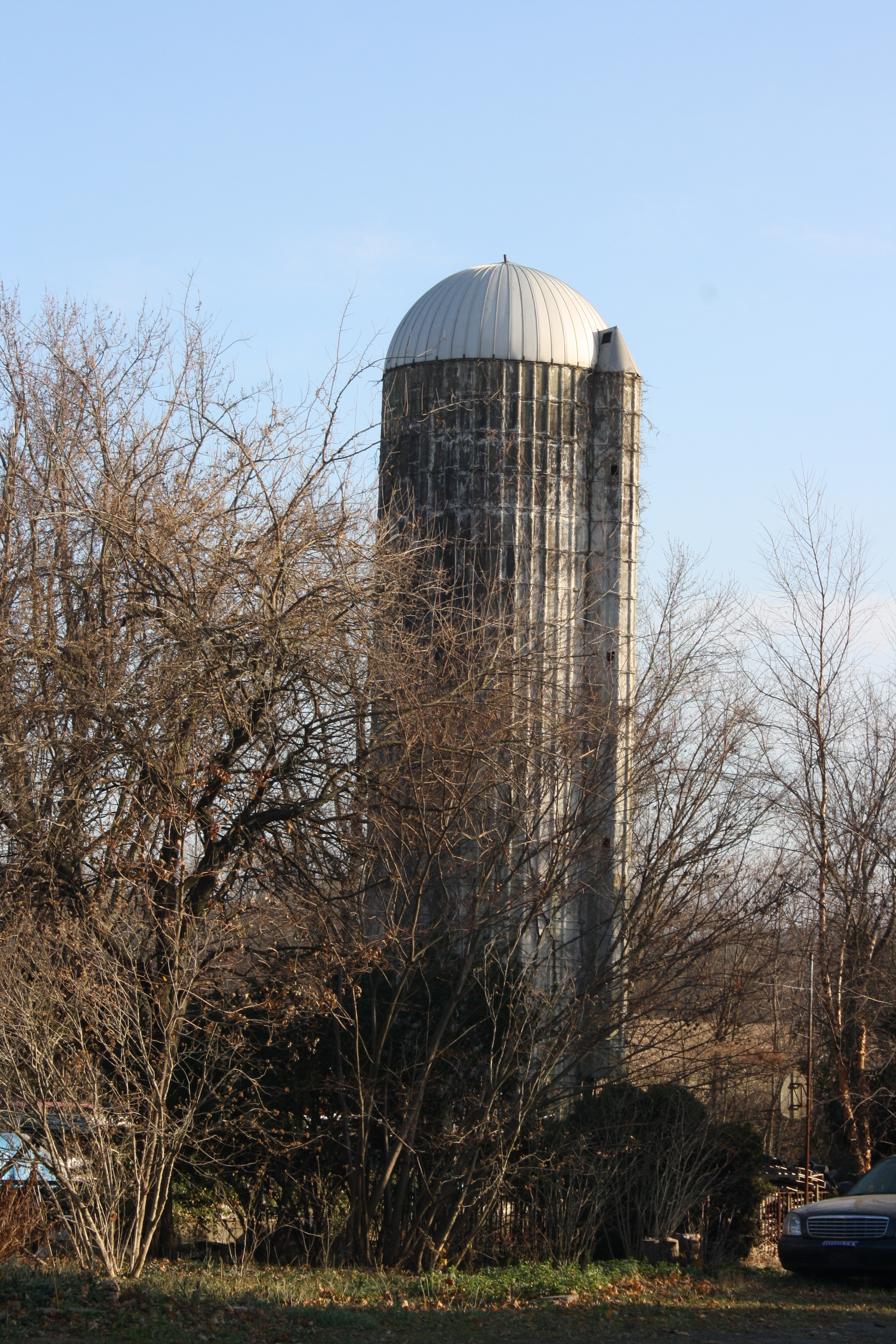
Silo
