= Newtown Township, Bucks County, Pennsylvania =

Township in Pennsylvania, US

Newtown Township
- Township
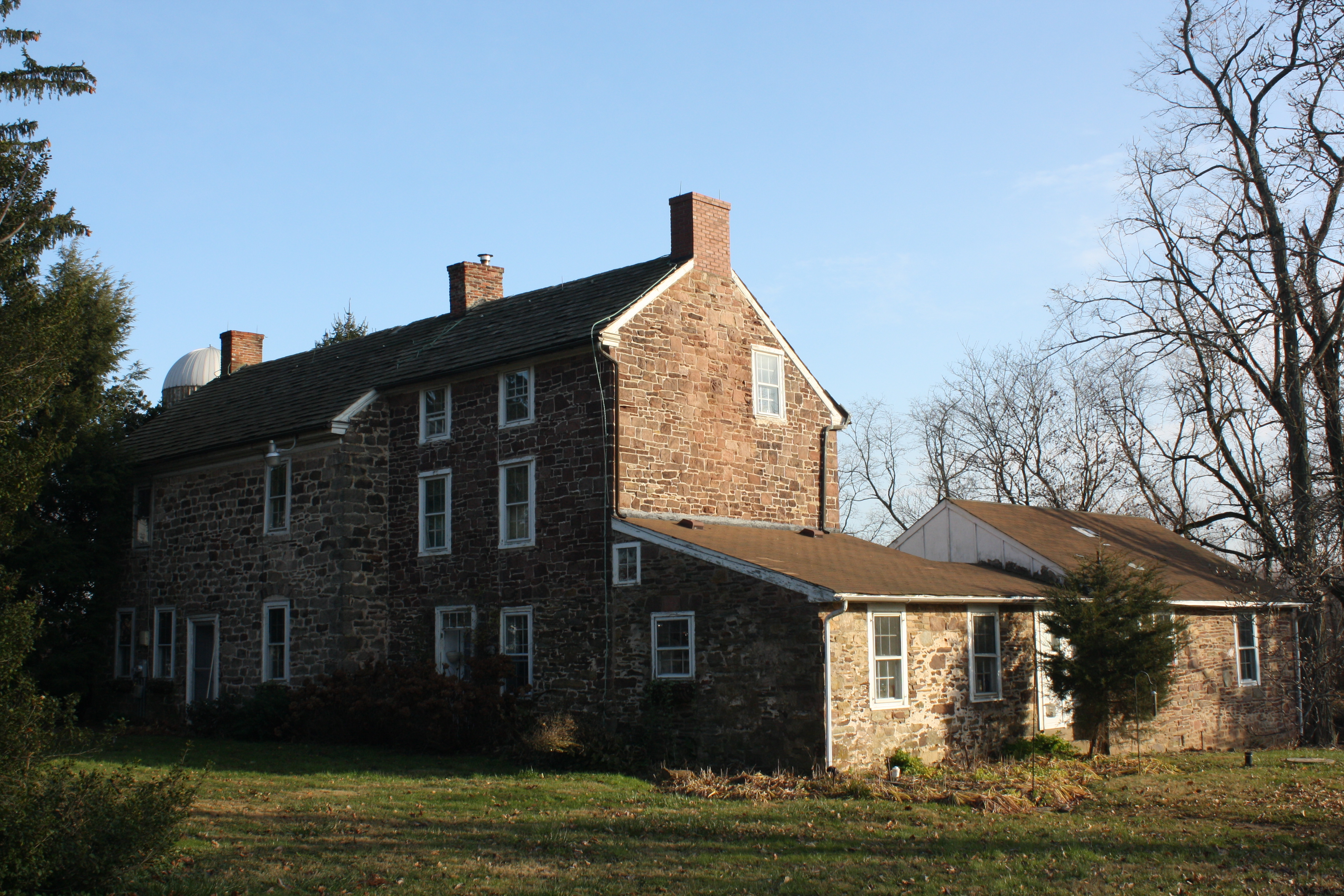
- Peter Taylor Farmhouse, built 1750

- Seal

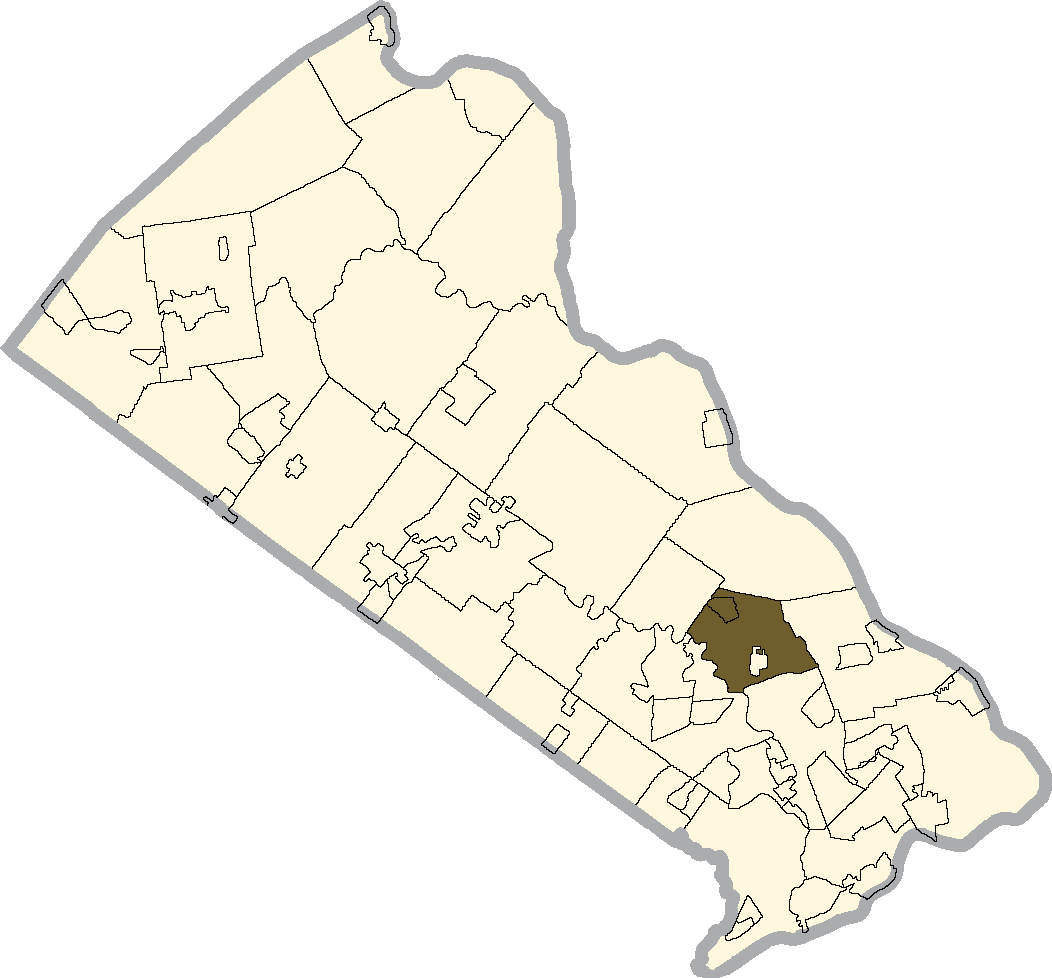
- Location of Newtown Township in Bucks County

- Location in Pennsylvania and the United States Newtown Township (the United States)
- Coordinates: 40°13′47″N 74°56′10″W
- Country: United States
- State: Pennsylvania
- County: Bucks

Area
  - Total: 11.98 sq mi (31.0 km^{2})
  - Land: 11.90 sq mi (30.8 km^{2})
  - Water: 0.08 sq mi (0.21 km^{2})
- Elevation: 164 ft (50 m)

Population (2020)
  - Total: 19,895
  - Estimate (2023): 19,701
  - Density: 1,672/sq mi (645.5/km^{2})
- Time zone: UTC-5 (EST)
  - Summer (DST): UTC-4 (EDT)
- Area codes: 215, 267 and 445
- FIPS code: 42-017-54192
- Website: newtownpa.gov

Newtown Township is a township in Bucks County, Pennsylvania, United States. The population was 19,895 at the 2020 census (predicted to be 19,701 in 2023).

== History ==
Newtown Township traces its roots back to William Penn, who purchased 5,000 acres (20 km^{2}) from the Lenape Indian tribe in 1683. He named this land "my New Township", which gradually evolved to Newtown Township. Newtown served as the County Seat of Bucks County from 1726 until 1813, when the Court was moved to Doylestown. In 1838, the area comprising the commercial center, plus a number of homes, was incorporated into Newtown Borough. Today, the Township surrounds Newtown Borough and each has its own form of government.

Newtown Township is governed by a 5-member Board of Supervisors who oversee a full-time township manager. Members are elected to serve 6 year terms. As of 2020 the Township Supervisors were Phil Calabro, Dennis Fisher, John Mack, Kyle Davis, and David Oxley.

== Geography ==
According to the U.S. Census Bureau, the township consists of a total area of 12.0 square miles (31 km^{2}), all land.

Former villages Spring Garden and Stoopville were located in the township, as is the census-designated place of Newtown Grant.

Natural features include Core Creek, Neshaminy Creek, and Newtown Creek.

== Demographics ==
Historical population
Census	Pop.	Note	%±
1930	712		—
1940	816		14.6%
1950	1,013		24.1%
1960	1,468		44.9%
1970	2,002		36.4%
1980	4,527		126.1%
1990	13,685		202.3%
2000	18,206		33.0%
2010	19,299		6.0%
2020	19,895		3.1%

As of 2010 census, the township was 87.8% Non-Hispanic White, 1.2% Black or African American, 0.1% Native American, 7.9% Asian, and 1.2% were two or more races. 1.9% of the population were of Hispanic or Latino ancestry.

As of the census of 2000, there were 18,206 people, 6,761 households, and 5,063 families residing in the township. The population density was 1,522.6 inhabitants per square mile (587.9/km^{2}). There were 6,848 housing units at an average density of 572.7 units per square mile (221.1 units/km^{2}).

There were 6,761 households, out of which 42.6% had children under the age of 18 living with them, 64.7% were married couples living together, 7.8% had a female householder with no husband present, and 25.1% were non-families. 21.0% of all households were made up of individuals, and 5.6% had someone living alone who was 65 years of age or older. The average household size was 2.68 and the average family size was 3.17.

In the township the population was spread out, with 28.9% under the age of 18, 4.8% from 18 to 24, 34.1% from 25 to 44, 24.1% from 45 to 64, and 8.2% who were 65 years of age or older. The median age was 37 years. For every 100 females there were 93.2 males. For every 100 females age 18 and over, there were 88.5 males.

The median income for a household in the township was $80,532, and the median income for a family was $91,923. Males had a median income of $65,064 versus $41,087 for females. The per capita income for the township was $34,335. About 1.2% of families and 1.5% of the population were below the poverty line, including 1.9% of those under age 18 and 5.1% of those age 65 or over.

== Climate ==
According to the Köppen climate classification system, Newtown Township, Pennsylvania has a hot-summer, wet all year, humid continental climate (Dfa). Dfa climates are characterized by at least one month having an average mean temperature ≤ 32.0 °F (≤ 0.0 °C), at least four months with an average mean temperature ≥ 50.0 °F (≥ 10.0 °C), at least one month with an average mean temperature ≥ 71.6 °F (≥ 22.0 °C), and no significant precipitation difference between seasons. During the summer months, episodes of extreme heat and humidity can occur with heat index values ≥ 100 °F (≥ 38 °C). On average, the wettest month of the year is July which corresponds with the annual peak in thunderstorm activity. During the winter months, episodes of extreme cold and wind can occur with wind chill values < 0 °F (< -18 °C). The plant hardiness zone is 7a with an average annual extreme minimum air temperature of 0.0 °F (−17.8 °C). The average seasonal (Nov-Apr) snowfall total is between 24 and 30 inches (61 and 76 centimetres), and the average snowiest month is February which corresponds with the annual peak in nor'easter activity.

Climate data for Newtown Township, Bucks County, Pennsylvania (1981 – 2010 averages)
Month	Jan	Feb	Mar	Apr	May	Jun	Jul	Aug	Sep	Oct	Nov	Dec	Year
Mean daily maximum °F (°C)	39.6 (4.2)	42.7 (5.9)	51.0 (10.6)	62.9 (17.2)	72.5 (22.5)	81.7 (27.6)	85.9 (29.9)	84.2 (29.0)	77.3 (25.2)	66.1 (18.9)	55.1 (12.8)	43.9 (6.6)	63.7 (17.6)
Daily mean °F (°C)	31.3 (−0.4)	34.0 (1.1)	41.4 (5.2)	52.2 (11.2)	61.7 (16.5)	71.2 (21.8)	75.7 (24.3)	74.2 (23.4)	67.0 (19.4)	55.3 (12.9)	45.7 (7.6)	35.9 (2.2)	53.9 (12.2)
Mean daily minimum °F (°C)	23.1 (−4.9)	25.2 (−3.8)	31.8 (−0.1)	41.4 (5.2)	50.8 (10.4)	60.6 (15.9)	65.6 (18.7)	64.2 (17.9)	56.6 (13.7)	44.6 (7.0)	36.4 (2.4)	27.8 (−2.3)	44.1 (6.7)
Average precipitation inches (mm)	3.54 (90)	2.78 (71)	4.14 (105)	3.97 (101)	4.32 (110)	4.35 (110)	5.22 (133)	4.33 (110)	4.42 (112)	3.82 (97)	3.64 (92)	4.08 (104)	48.61 (1,235)
Average relative humidity (%)	66.1	62.7	58.7	57.6	62.3	66.6	66.8	69.1	70.3	69.5	67.9	68.1	65.5
Average dew point °F (°C)	21.3 (−5.9)	22.6 (−5.2)	28.0 (−2.2)	37.7 (3.2)	48.7 (9.3)	59.5 (15.3)	63.9 (17.7)	63.4 (17.4)	57.0 (13.9)	45.5 (7.5)	35.7 (2.1)	26.4 (−3.1)	42.6 (5.9)
Source: PRISM Climate Group

== Ecology ==
According to the A. W. Kuchler U.S. potential natural vegetation types, Newtown Township, Pennsylvania would have an Appalachian Oak (104) vegetation type with an Eastern Hardwood Forest (25) vegetation form.

== Transportation ==
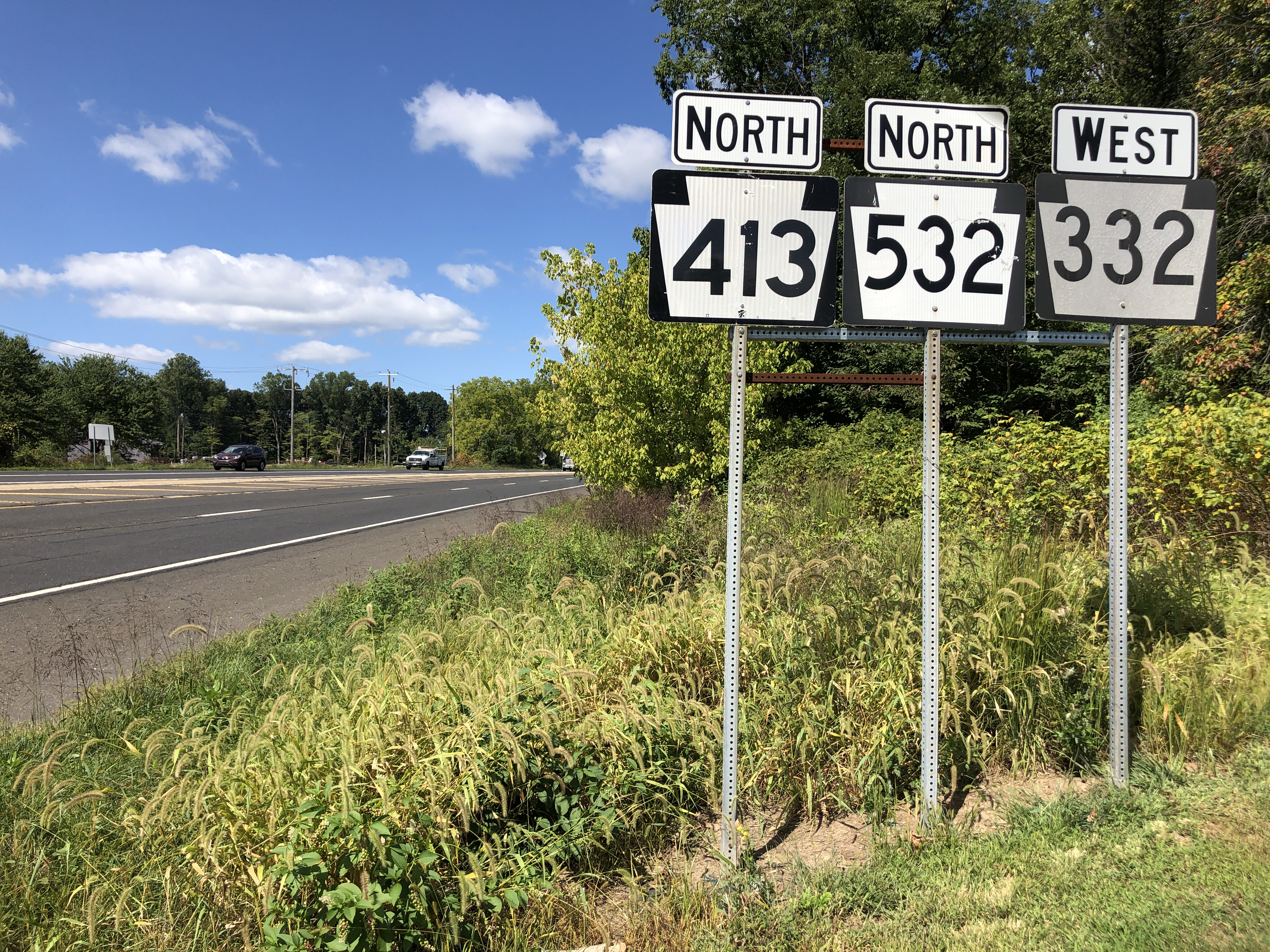
PA 332, PA 413 and PA 532 along the Newtown Bypass in Newtown Township

As of 2018 there were 87.36 miles (140.59 km) of public roads in Newtown Township, of which 16.15 miles (25.99 km) were maintained by the Pennsylvania Department of Transportation (PennDOT) and 71.21 miles (114.60 km) were maintained by the township.

Three state highways traverse the township: Pennsylvania Route 332, Pennsylvania Route 413 and Pennsylvania Route 532. PA 332 follows a generally east–west alignment, PA 413 follows a generally north–south alignment, and PA 532 follows a southwest–northeast alignment. All three originally passed directly through the middle of the township, with PA 332 and PA 413 also crossing the borough of Newtown, but all now follow the Newtown Bypass to avoid central parts of the township and Newtown Borough.

SEPTA provides Suburban Bus service to Newtown Township along Route 130, which runs between Bucks County Community College in the township and Frankford Avenue and Knights Road in Northeast Philadelphia.

== Parks and recreation ==
- Chandler Fields
- Clark Nature Center
- Helen Randle
- Roberts Ridge
- Carl Sedia
- Silver Lake Park
- Tyler State Park
- Newtown Skate Park
- Veterans Park

== Notable people ==
- Deirdre Bolton, broadcast journalist and business news and commentator
- Alexandra Cooper (1994–), podcaster
- Kenneth Frazier, Chairman, President and CEO Merck & Co.
- Felix Hirsch, German Jewish journalist and historian
