= Twelfth Street Meeting House =

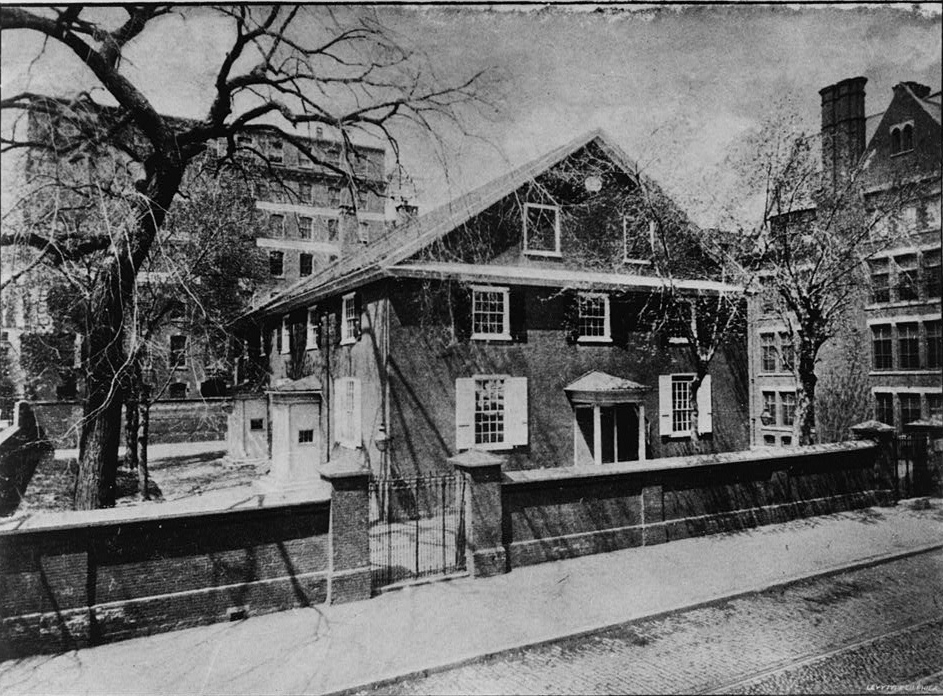
- Twelfth Street Meeting House (before 1892), in its original location. Penn Charter School is right.
- Interactive map of the Twelfth Street Meeting House area
- Former names: Western District Meeting House; Central Philadelphia Meeting House
- Alternative names: Meeting House at George School

General information
- Type: Quaker meeting house
- Architectural style: Federal
- Location: Original: 20 South 12th Street, Philadelphia, Pennsylvania; Current: George School, 1690 Langhorne-Newtown Road, Newtown, Pennsylvania, United States
- Coordinates: Original: 39°57′04.2″N 75°09′37.0″W; Current: 40°12′40.6″N 74°56′1.5″W
- Completed: 1812–1813
- Relocated: 1972–1974

Height
- Roof: 48 ft (15 m)

Dimensions
- Other dimensions: Width: 57 ft 4 in (17.48 m); Length: 90 ft 8 in (27.64 m)

Technical details
- Material: Brick, laid in Flemish bond

Design and construction
- Architects: Abraham Carlisle (1755); John D. Smith (1812–1813)

Renovating team
- Architect: Charles S. Hough (1972–1974)

Twelfth Street Meeting House was a Quaker meeting house in Philadelphia, Pennsylvania. It was built on the west side of 12th Street, south of Market Street, 1812–1813, incorporating architectural elements from Philadelphia's Greater Meeting House (1755).

The building was dismantled and relocated to Newtown, Bucks County, Pennsylvania in 1972, and reconstructed, 1973–1974. Since then it has served as the meeting house for George School.

== History ==
=== Greater Meeting House ===
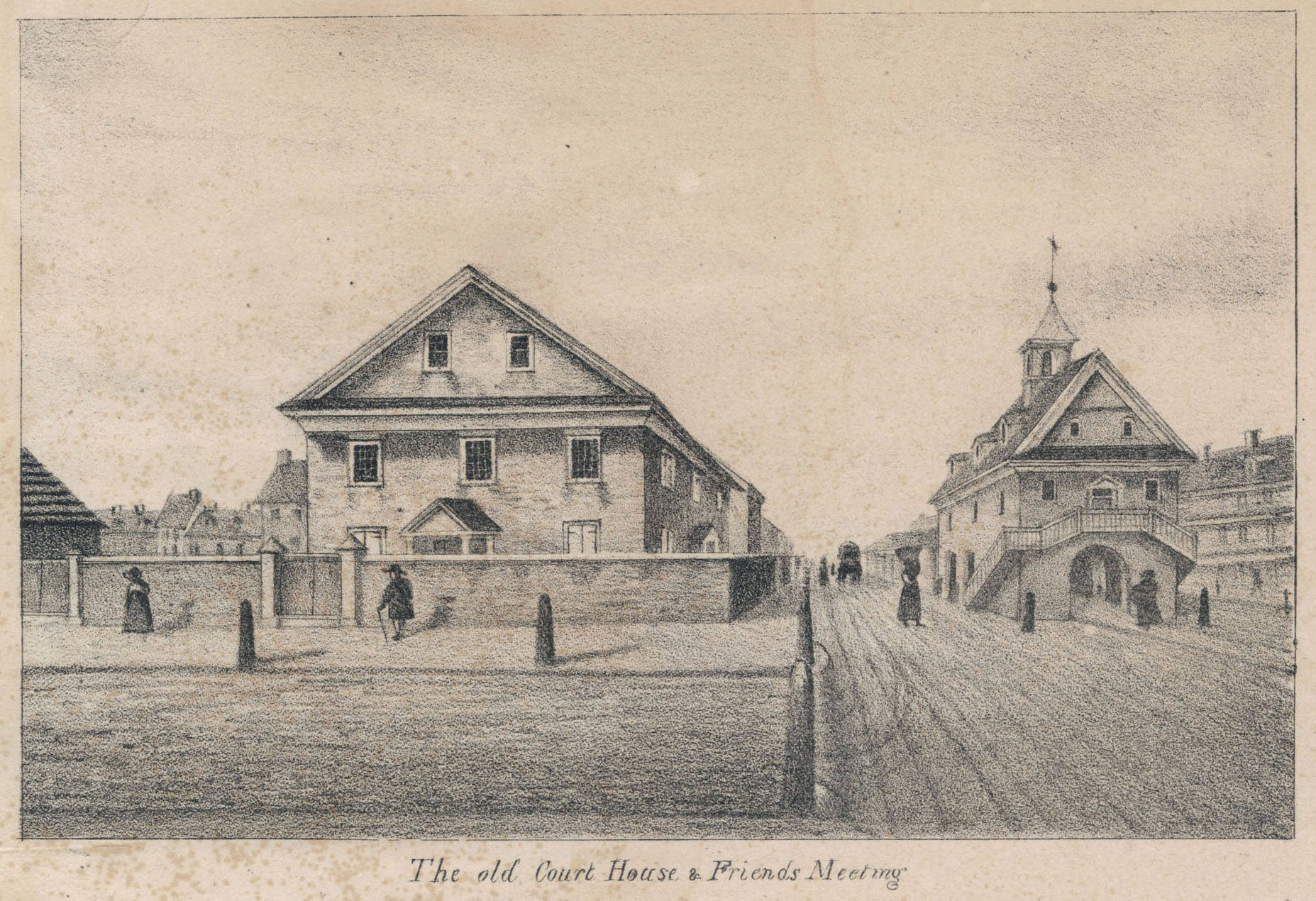
Philadelphia Greater Meeting House (1755, demolished 1812), left

The Philadelphia Greater Meeting House was built in 1755 at the southwest corner of 2nd and Market Streets. Constructed by carpenter Abraham Carlisle and his apprentice, Isaac Coates, the square brick building – 57-ft (17.4-m) per side – was unusually large for the American Colonies. Its six triangular roof trusses – 58-by-20-foot (17.7 m × 6.1 m) – were made of pine and held together with wooden pegs rather than nails.

As Philadelphia grew as a commercial city, the area near the waterfront became too noisy for the quiet contemplation of Quaker worship and inconvenient for many members of the meeting. The land on which the Greater Meeting House stood was sold in 1809, with the proceeds to go toward building a meeting house further west.

=== 12th Street ===
A plot of land on South 12th Street – 142 by 134 ft (43 by 41 m) – was purchased in 1810 for $11,000. Carpenter John D. Smith dismantled the old building. Its roof trusses, which dictated the width of the new building, were unpegged and transported in pieces. Other architectural elements such as windows, doors and columns were salvaged and reused. The new building was longer than the old – 91 ft (28 m), rather than 57 ft (17 m). Smith built two additional roof trusses of tulip poplar, and increased the spacing between all of them. The two-story main meeting room replicated the dimensions of the Greater Meeting House's square interior, and at least some of its old benches were reused. The new building's extension featured a one-story women's meeting room, separated from the main meeting room by a movable partition, and a second floor room. Construction of the Twelfth Street Meeting House was completed in April 1813, at a cost of $21,410.46.

In 1827 a schism occurred in American Quakerism, which divided into Orthodox and Hicksite factions. Twelfth Street Meeting remained a stronghold for Orthodox Friends.

From 1874 to 1925, the meeting house was used for daily meeting by the adjacent William Penn Charter School, a Quaker private school for boys at the southwest corner of 12th and Market Streets. The school moved to a suburban campus in 1925, and its school building was demolished to build the PSFS Building (1930).

The schism in American Quakerism was formally healed in 1955. The following year, the formerly-Orthodox Twelfth Street Meeting and the formerly-Hicksite Race Street Meeting merged to form the Central Philadelphia Monthly Meeting. The two bodies consolidated at the Race Street Meeting House, making the 12th Street building superfluous. In September 1969, CPMM announced an agreement to sell the property to PSFS for $810,000.

==== Friends Institute and AFSC ====
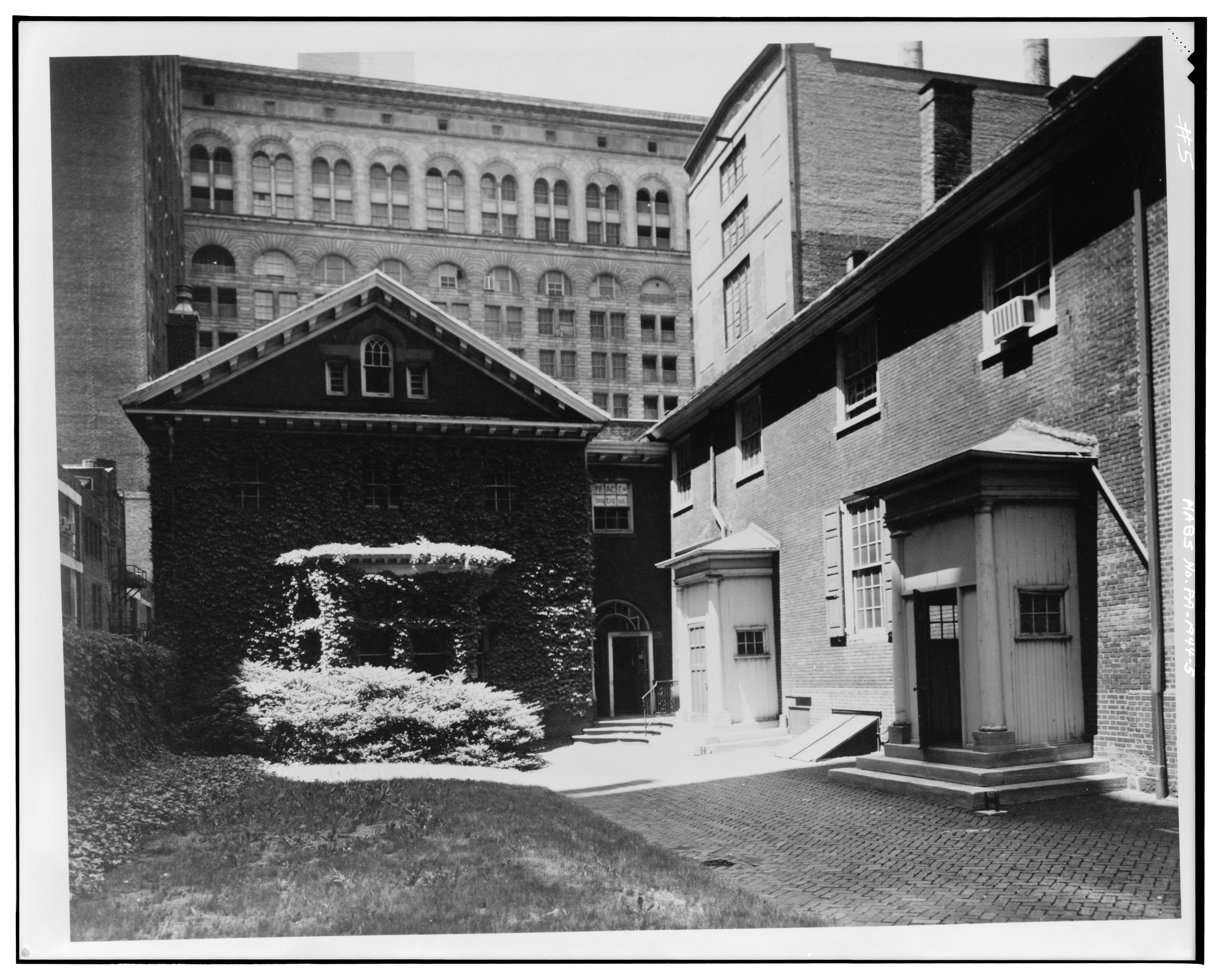
Friends Institute (1892, demolished 1972), left, with the John Wanamaker Department Store in the background.

The Friends Institute, a one-story social hall, was built southwest of the meeting house in 1892. A second story was added in 1909, to provide offices and lodging rooms for visitors.

In April 1917, days after the United States declared war on Germany and entered World War I, a group of Quakers met at the Twelfth Street Meeting House to discuss the impending military draft. They formed the American Friends Service Committee to negotiate alternative service – rather than imprisonment – for conscientious objectors to the war. AFSC first had its headquarters in the Friends Institute, but soon expanded into the former women's meeting room. The main meeting room's balcony was divided into offices for AFSC in 1936, and occupied until 1960, when the organization moved to the Central Philadelphia Monthly Meeting. AFSC shared in the 1947 Nobel Peace Prize, and continues to work for peace and social justice in the United States and around the world.

The Friends Institute building was demolished in 1972.

=== Relocation ===
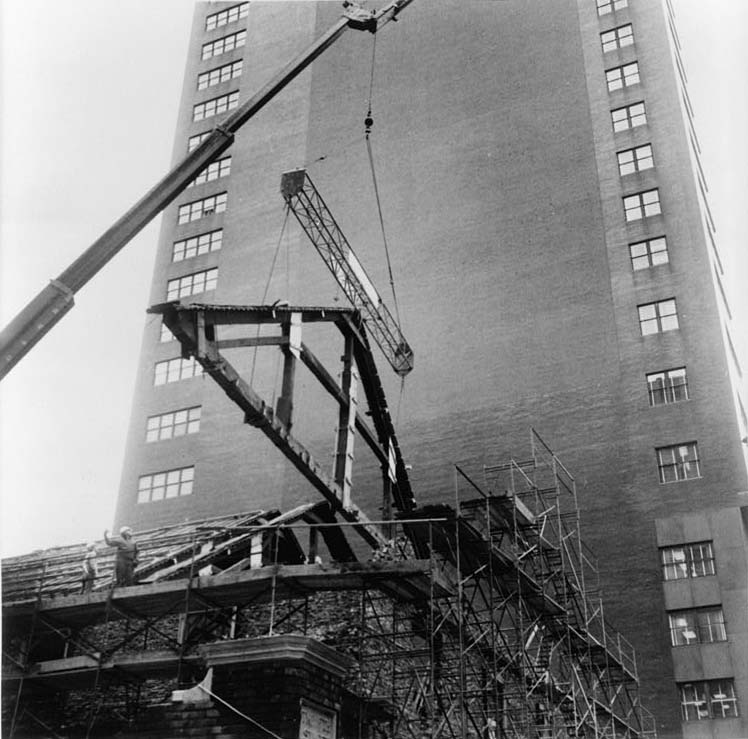
Removal of the meeting house's first roof truss, July 1972. PSFS Building is in the background.

The Twelfth Street Meeting House embodied more than 200 years of Philadelphia Quaker history, and there was an intense desire to find a way to preserve the building. In the 1930s, a floor joist had been discovered with the initials "AC + IC" and the date "1755" spelled out in nailheads. This was presumed to have been the Greater Meeting House's builders, Abraham Carlisle and Isaac Coates, "signing" their work.

The Central Philadelphia Monthly Meeting delayed finalizing the sale to PSFS for two years, hoping to find a donor who would relocate the building. Several non-profits expressed interest, but withdrew after examining the high cost of reconstruction. To make the deal more attractive, CPMM committed to paying the cost of the building's dismantling and transportation. The sale of the property to PSFS was finalized on October 10, 1971, but the fate of the meeting house remained unresolved. The William Penn Charter School – which had used the building for daily meeting for more than 50 years – worked diligently to raise funds to relocate the meeting house to its campus in Germantown, but finally was forced to give up its bid at the end of November. In December, George School announced that an anonymous donor had committed to paying for the building's reconstruction on its campus in Bucks County. Following the donors' deaths, it was revealed that they had been a married couple, F. Palin Spruance and Helen Sensenderfer Spruance. The cost of dismantling and transporting the pieces of the building was $60,000. The cost of reconstruction has never been disclosed, but was estimated at up to half-a-million dollars.

Architect Charles Hough, of the firm Hayes & Hough, supervised the dismantling of the building in Summer 1972. In addition to the structural and architectural elements, between 50% and 75% of its bricks were salvaged and reused. The pieces of the building were numbered, transported 28 mi (45 km) to the George School campus, and reconstructed beginning in Spring 1973.

=== Reconstruction ===
"It's all about the trusses." — Charles Hough.

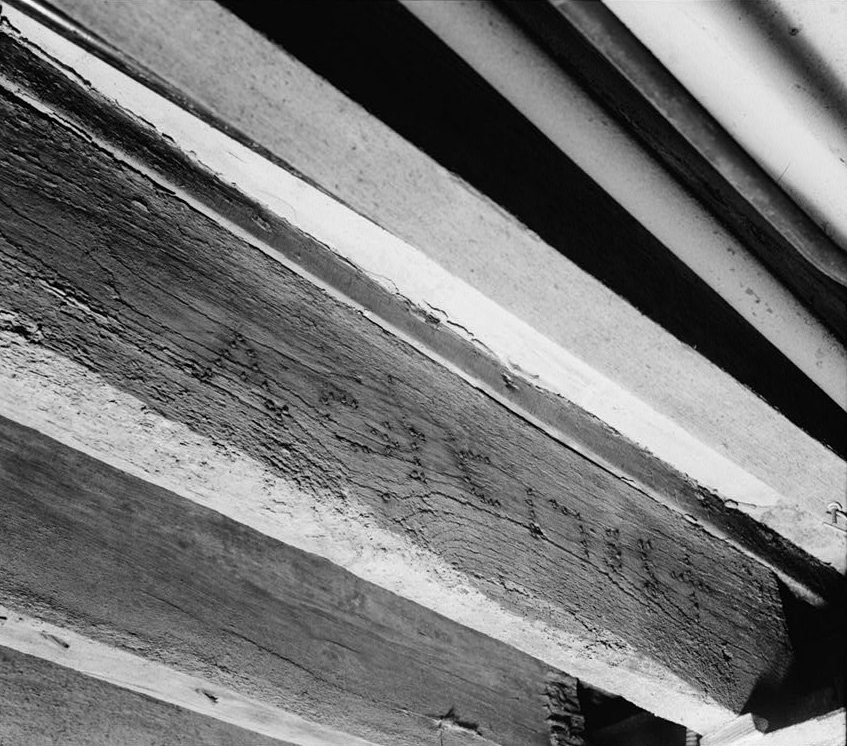
Floor joist from the Great Meeting House, signed "AC + IC 1755."

Hough reconstructed the exterior to look as it had in 1813. He removed a 20th-century addition that contained bathrooms and a caretaker's apartment, along with anachronisms such as a Colonial Revival triple window added to the women's meeting room. He used modern materials – cinderblock, concrete, steel – for structure; faced the building with original bricks laid in Flemish bond; and reinstalled the marble steps, exterior woodwork, windows and doors. The 1755 and 1813 buildings had been oriented east-west; the reconstructed building was oriented north-south.

Hough used the interior to evoke both of the ancestor buildings. At the south end, he created a great room, 54 ft (16 m) on each side – the interior dimensions of the 1755 Greater Meeting House – and a soaring 45 ft (14 m) tall. Dramatically, he left the original roof trusses exposed, high overhead. At the north end, he represented the length of the 12th Street building's extension with a 1-story "activities room." A continuous line of wainscoting around the interior visually united the two spaces. He turned a side entrance to the women's meeting room into the building's main entrance, and inserted a staircase at its northwest corner. This led up to a second floor balcony overlooking the great room, or led down to a basement with bathrooms and utilities. At the northeast corner, he inserted a kitchenette and closets. Benches, railings, waincoting and other interior woodwork were refinished and reused. Hough's attention to detail extended to attaching the reused floorboards with replicas of the 1813 iron nails, forged by a local blacksmith. Along the north wall, he installed the ministers' gallery and elders' bench – a raised platform traditionally reserved for visiting ministers and persons of authority. In a crowning gesture, above the gallery/bench he mounted the 1755 floor joist "signed" by the meeting house's original builders, Abraham Carlisle and Isaac Coates.

The Philadelphia Chapter of the American Institute of Architects recognized Hough's work on the meeting house with a 1975 award for excellence. He was a lifelong Quaker, and a 1944 graduate of George School. In his 2016 obituary, his family recalled that relocating the meeting house had been the "proudest moment" of his career.

The restored meeting house was re-dedicated September 24, 1974. Now shared with Newtown Friends School, the building continues to be used for daily meeting, lectures, concerts, and special events.

== Measured drawings ==
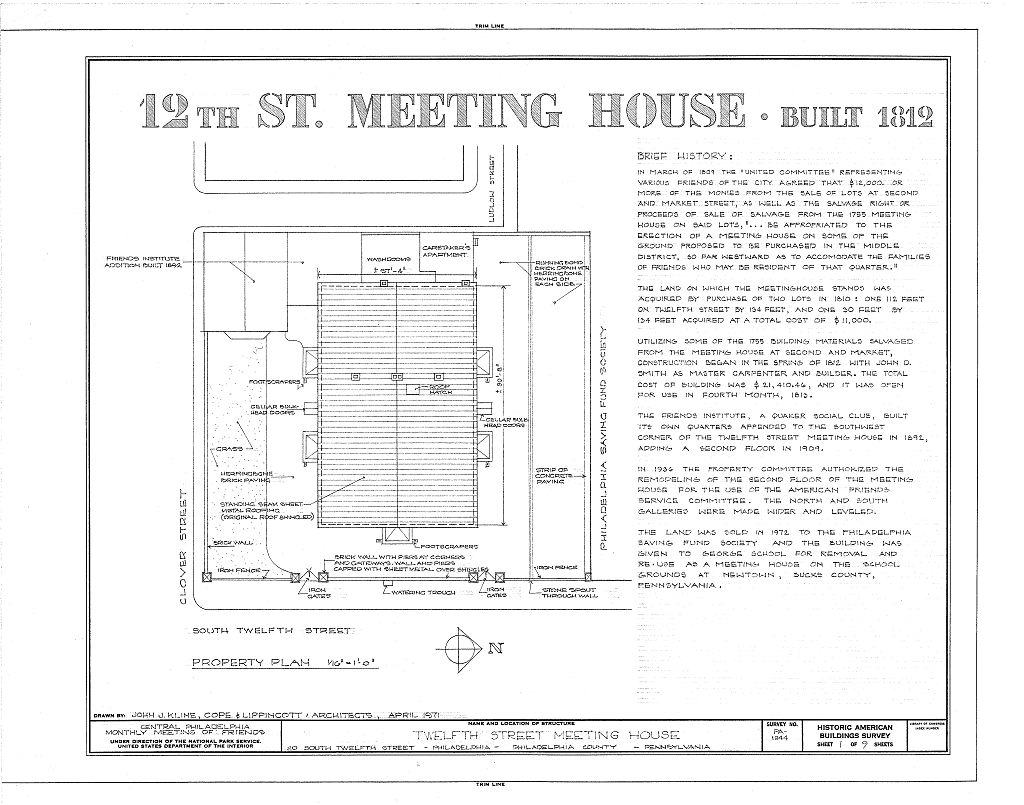

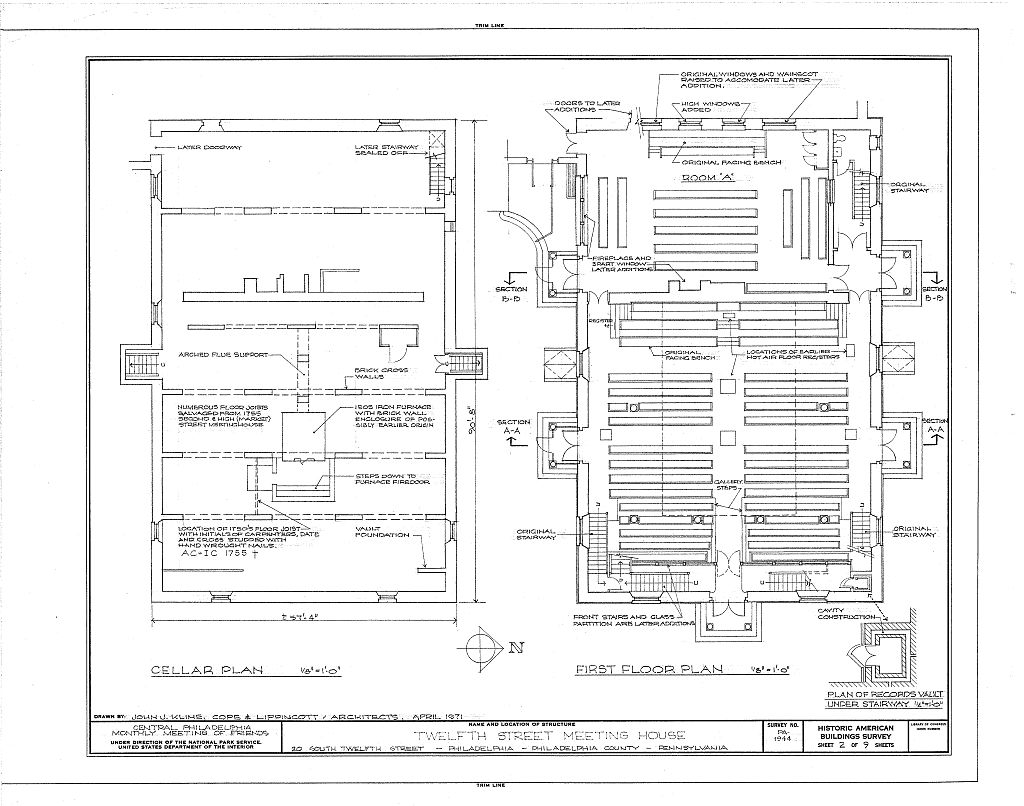

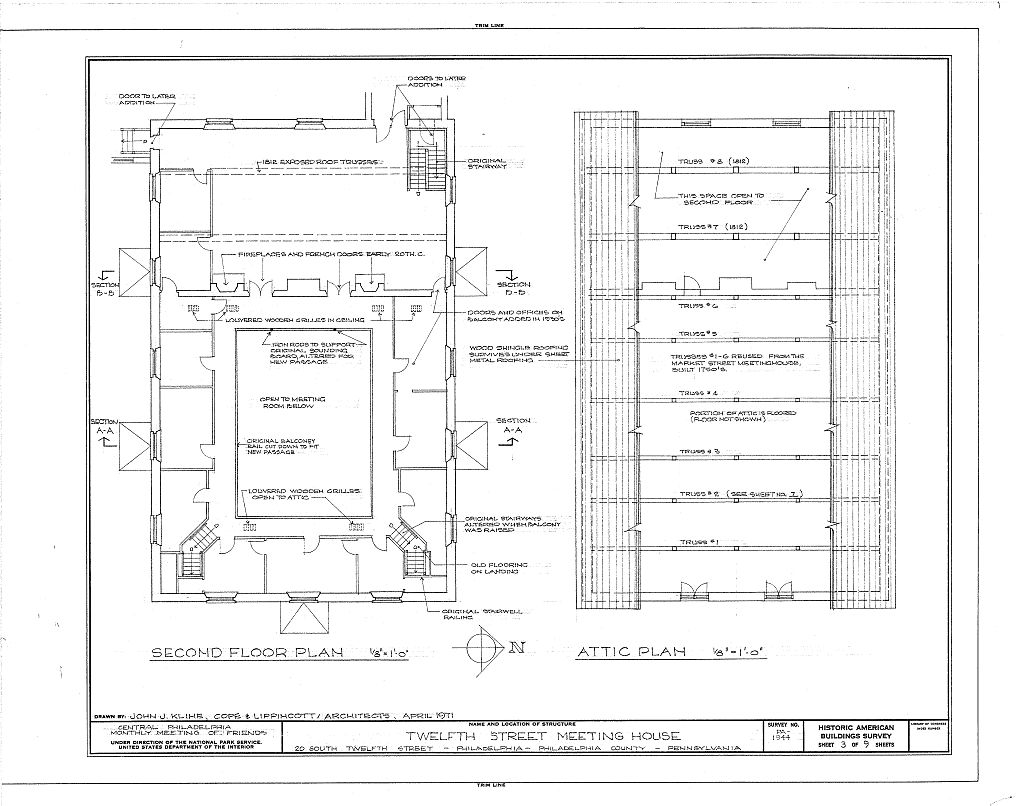

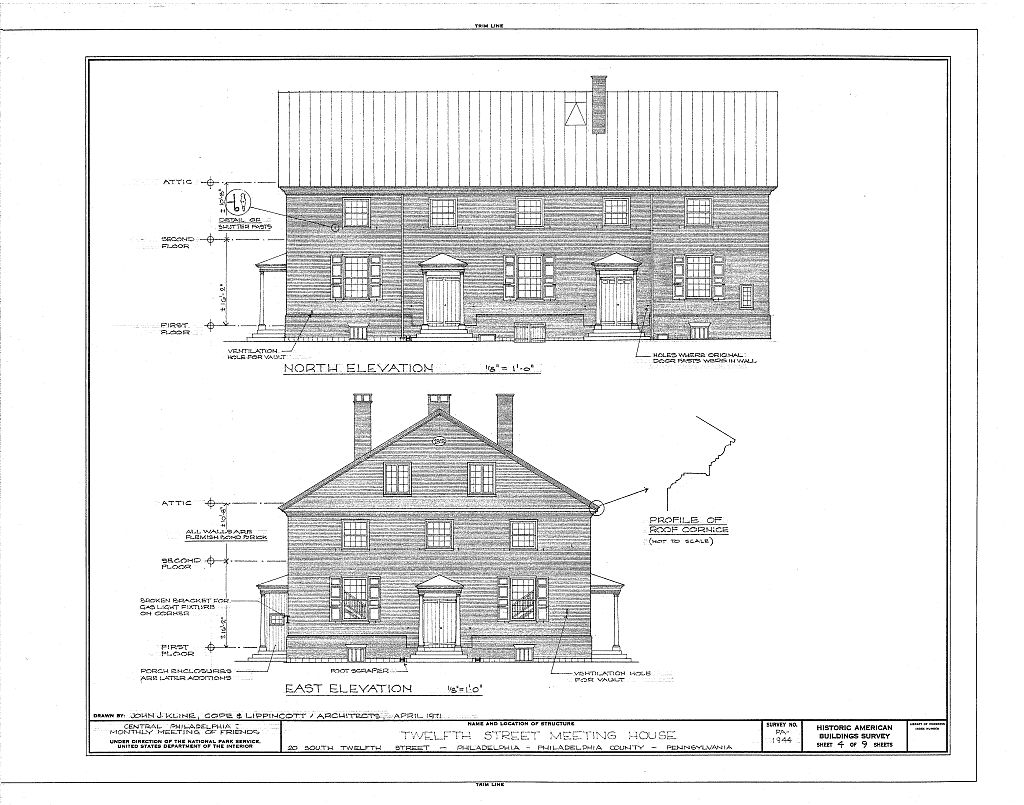

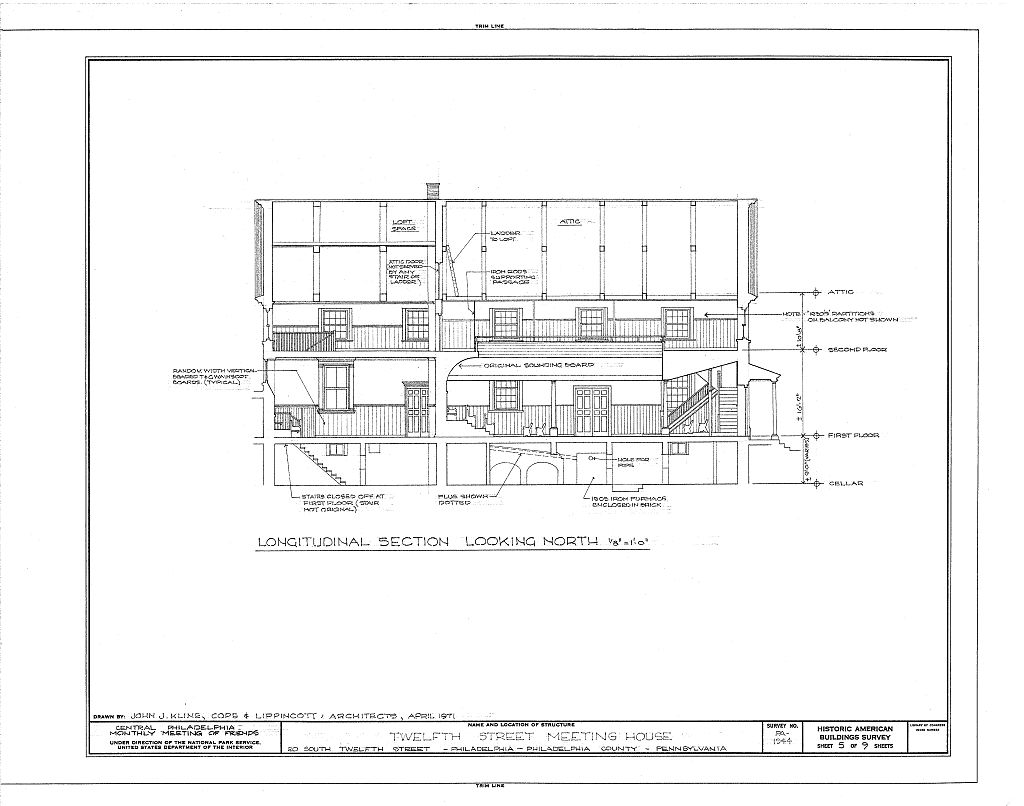

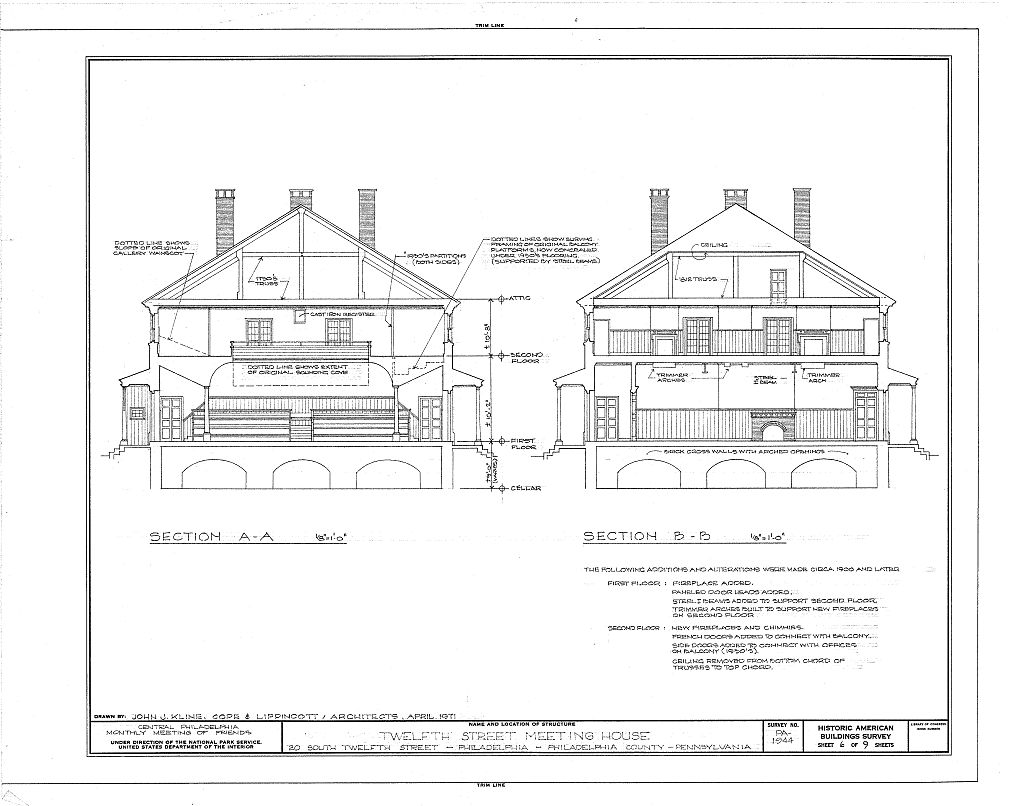

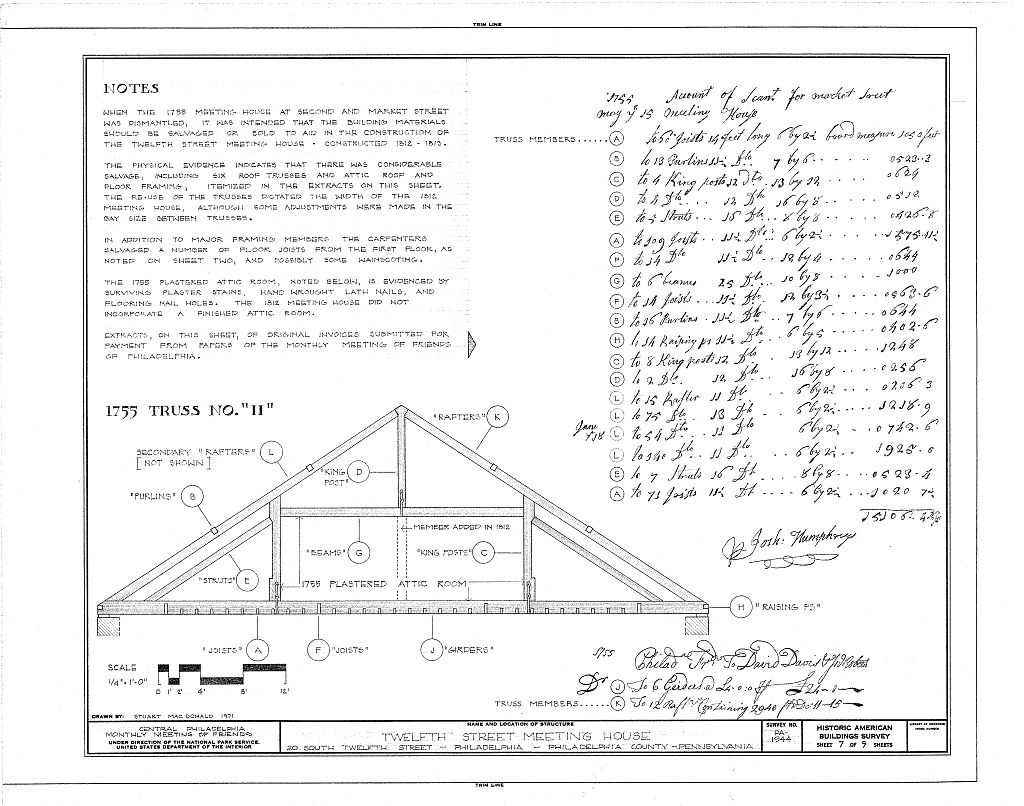

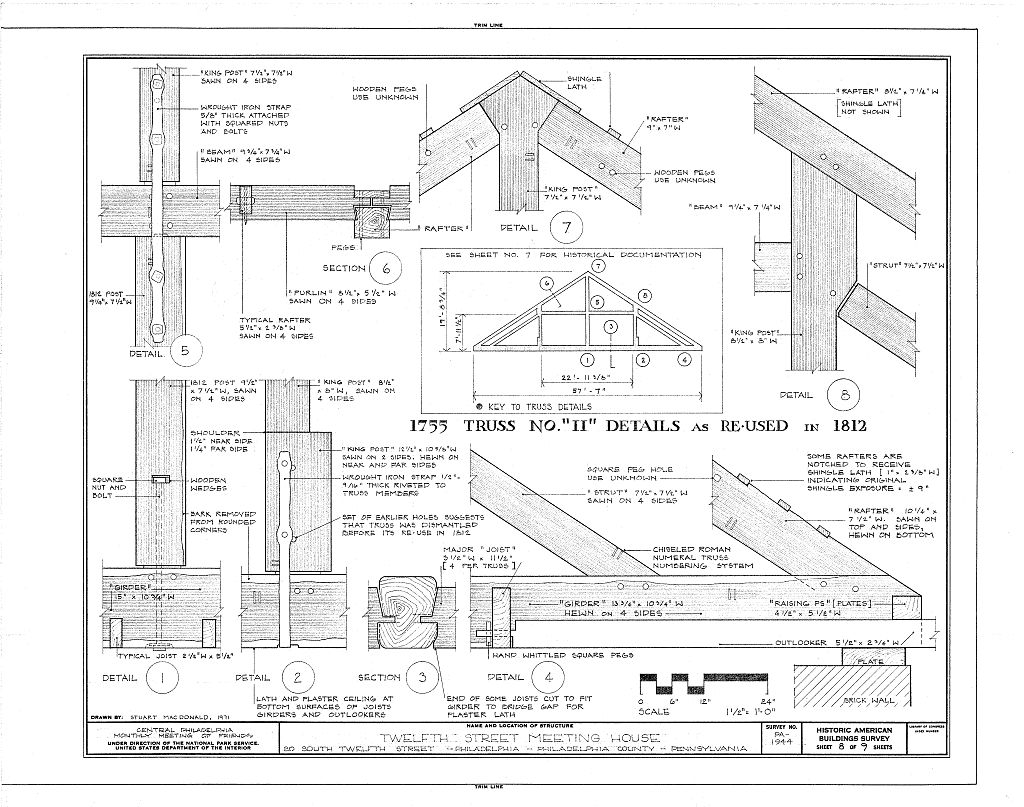

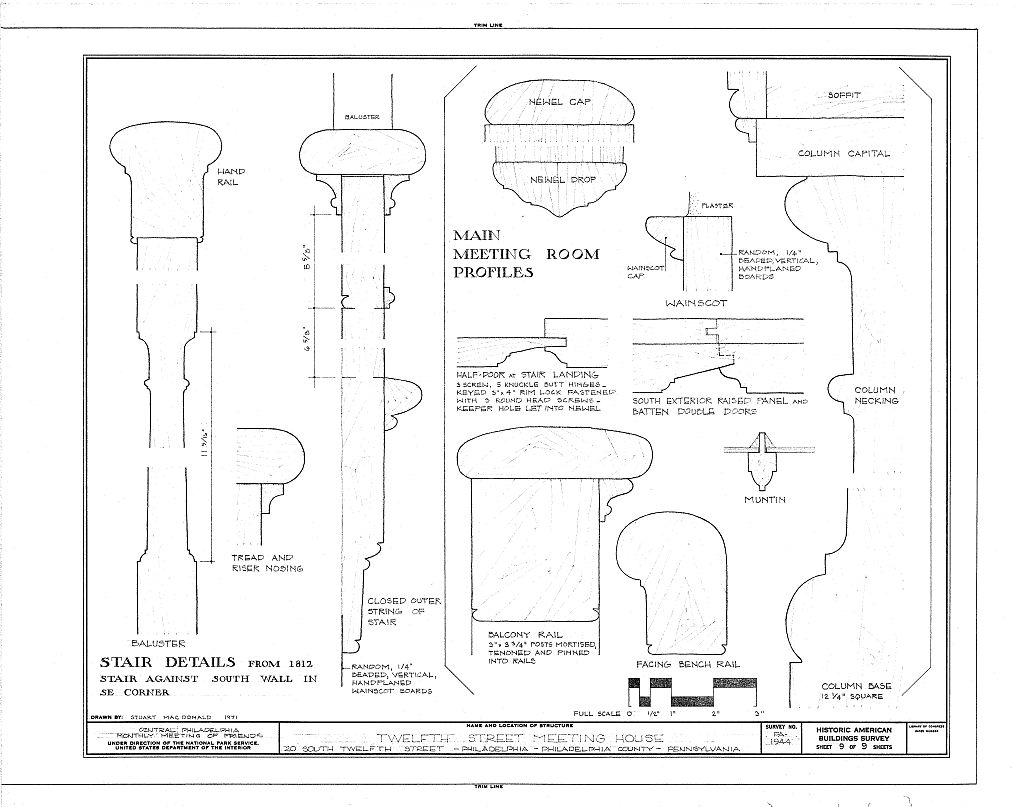

== Photos ==
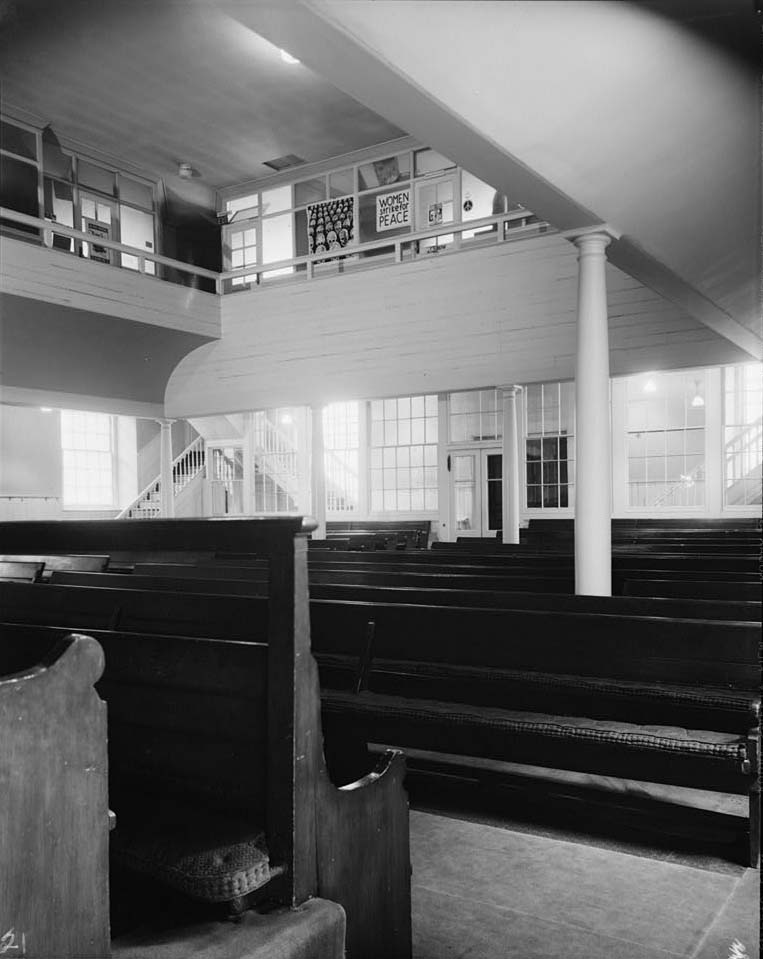
Main meeting room, prior to relocation. The offices in the balcony were built for AFSC.

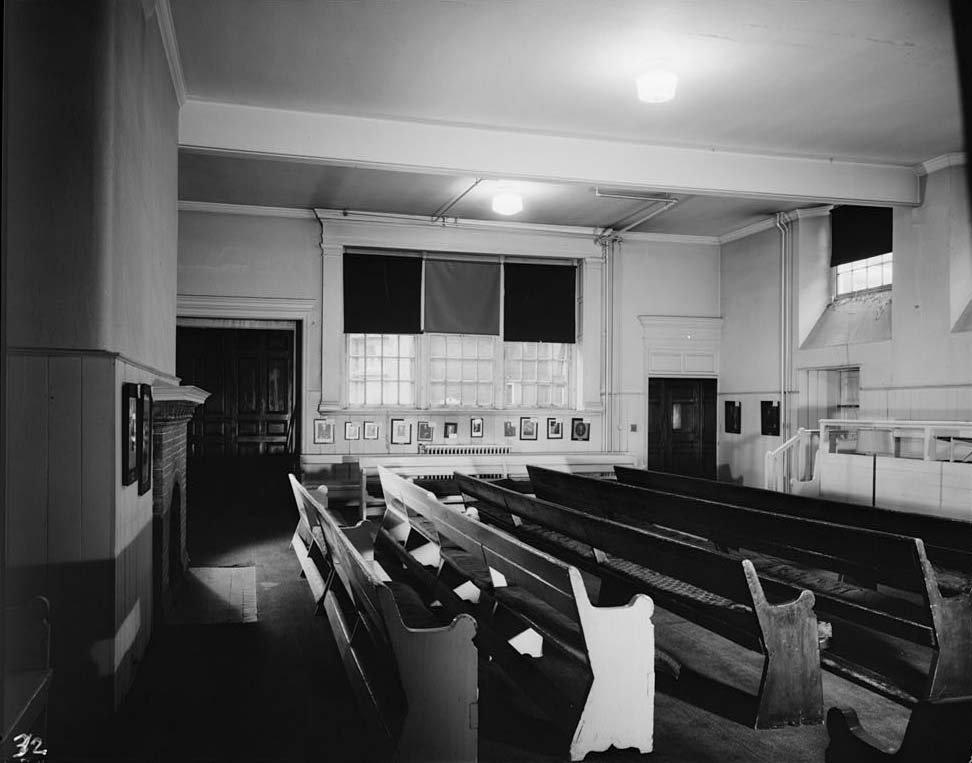
Women's meeting room, prior to relocation. Note the ministers' gallery and elders' bench (far right).

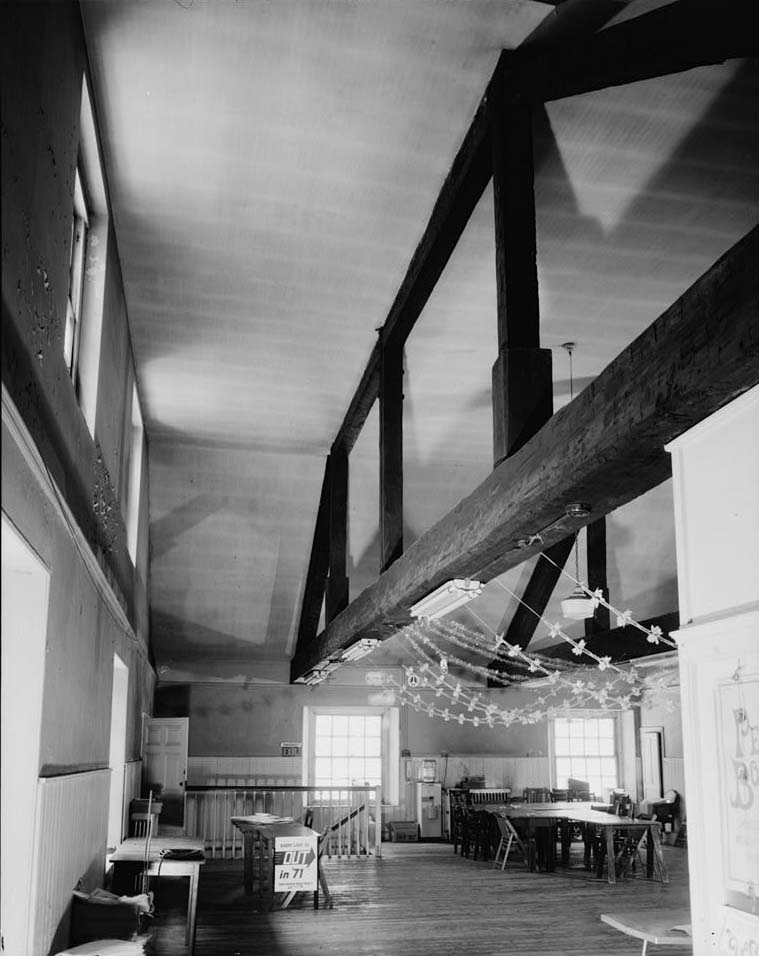
The two 1812 roof trusses in the second floor room, prior to relocation.

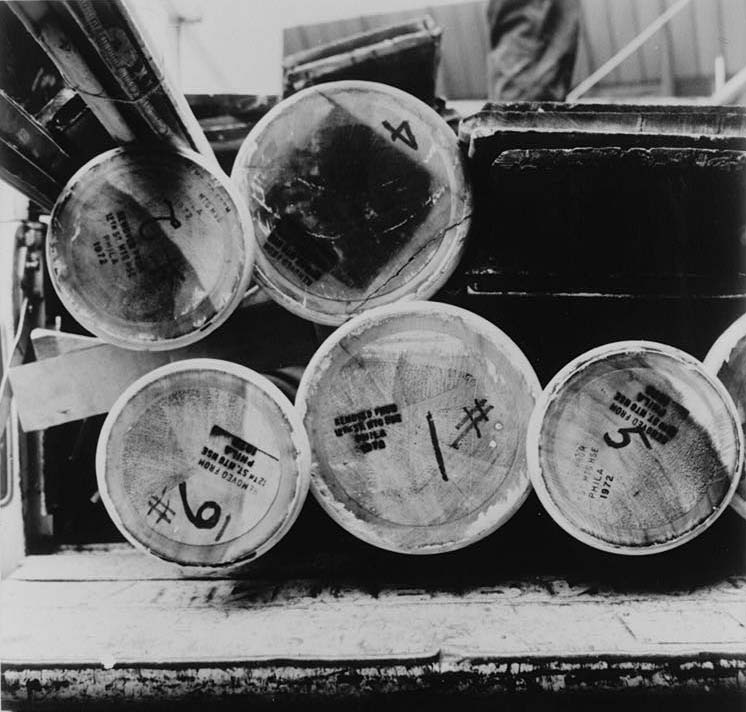
Columns from the main meeting room, numbered for relocation.
