= Sara Lomax-Reese =

American journalist

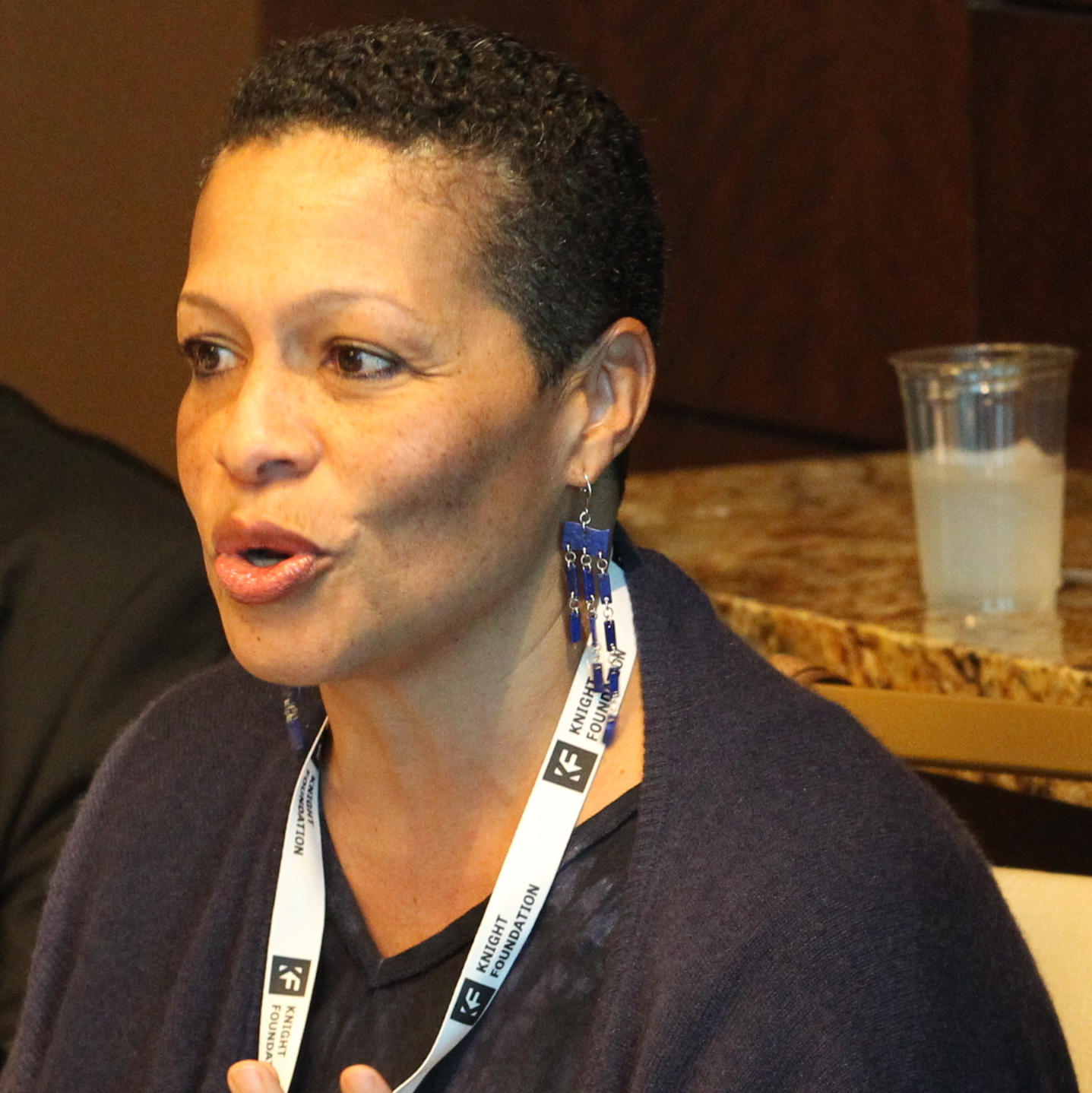
- at the 2019 Knight Foundation Media Forum
- Education: University of Pennsylvania
- Occupations: journalist, CEO
- Writing career
- Genre: non-fiction

Sara Lomax-Reese is an American journalist, media executive and entrepreneur. Lomax-Reese is the president and CEO of WURD Radio, the only African-American owned talk radio station in Pennsylvania. She is the co-founder of URL Media along with S. Mitra Kalita.

== Early life ==
Lomax-Reese is one of six siblings and the youngest daughter of Walter P. Lomax Jr., a physician and entrepreneur. Lomax purchased WURD 900 AM in 2003.

Lomax-Reese attended The George School, a Quaker boarding and day high school, in Newtown, Pennsylvania, where she graduated in 1983. She attended the University of Pennsylvania, Philadelphia and graduated from there in 1987. She is also a graduate of the Columbia University Graduate School of Journalism.

== Career ==
Lomax-Reese co-founded the magazine HealthQuest: Total Wellness for Body, Mind & Spirit, the first nationally circulated African-American consumer health magazine in the country. She has written for The Atlanta Journal-Constitution, The Miami Herald, The Philadelphia Inquirer, Essence Magazine, and American Visions Magazine. Her essay “Black Mothers/Sons” is featured in the 2016 book "Our Black Sons Matter".

Lomax-Reese has taught communications at Oglethorpe University in Atlanta, Georgia, and a collaborative course at the University of Pennsylvania.

== Honors and awards ==
In 2019, Lomax-Reese was elected to Arcadia University's board of trustees.

== Bibliography ==
Contributor to "Our Black Sons Matter: Mothers Talk about Fears, Sorrows, and Hopes" (Rowman & Littlefield, 2016).
