= Johanna Meyer-Lövinson =

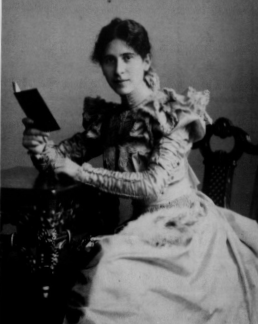
Johanna Meyer-Lövinson

Johanna Meyer-Lövinson (1874 – 1957) was a German-American Jewish radio host, performer, and art model.

== Early life ==
Johanna Lövinson was born on January 13, 1874, in Berlin, Germany. She was the youngest of the seven children of realtor and businessman Siegfried Lövinson and Rosalie Hirschberg.

Johanna was 17 when she first attended a teachers' seminary. At the age of 19, she moved to Italy in order to work as a governess. She returned to Berlin and took “dramatic lessons”, learning from actor Max Pohl. Johanna then took “voice and breathing lessons”, and learned German literature. She taught students in fishing schools proper diction and literature. Frequently, she taught German language to foreign people, directed amateur plays, and organized a book club. The year 1896 was Johanna's first “public performance, a charity event for needy children”. This was her first of many performances for charity, as she continued this for more than thirty years.

== Personal life ==
Johanna married businessman Eugen Meyer (who was 12 years older than her) in 1901. Hildegard (the couple's first child) was born in 1902, but died of influenza shortly after being born. The couple's son, Paul, was born in 1904, and their daughter, Leonore, in 1911. Johanna's children had emigrated to the U.S. and lived in Chicago, Illinois, by 1938. Johanna joined her children that year (her children had obtained a visa for her), and lived in an apartment that they had bought for her in Chicago. She had joined Leonore the following year in Reading, Pennsylvania, where Leonore was a kindergarten teacher. Johanna began to study English and took "Americanization classes." Johanna and her daughter then moved to Philadelphia, Pennsylvania, in 1943. When World War II ended in 1945, Johanna learned that the majority of her family in Europe had perished in the war. Johanna was hospitalized in 1956, and died on April 29, 1957.

== Career ==
Shortly after Paul's birth, Eugen's business fell through, and Johanna resumed teaching students in schools. She also gave voice projection lessons; lectured on Jewish subjects; and read children's stories (occasionally in costume and with music) "in rented halls". This opened the door for Johanna to perform "readings of literature for more organizations and events". Through these jobs, Johanna became acquainted with famous writers like Ernst Toller, Stefan Zweig, and Georg Hermann. Johanna became "a successful and prolific reciting artist", and occasionally travelled to perform. Sometimes, she invited the authors of her book club books to join her in her reading circles. In 1923, the first German radio station opened in Berlin, and Johanna joined the station in 1924. She read children's literature, and gave "lectures on women's issues". Johanna became a famous speaker, "and she was often requested at cultural events in various cities". When the Nazis took power in 1933, Johanna lost her radio position, yet she resumed performing "dramatic readings and lectures for the Jüdischer Kulturbund".

In 1946, Johanna started modeling for art students at multiple art schools in Philadelphia. She was required to "dress in costume, and to project her personality". She also taught German at the Junto school in Chicago, where she continued to teach until 1956. In 1950, Johanna played the role of a patient's mother in a brief educational film about mental health produced by the Pennsylvania Department of Welfare. She worked for German-language radio stations in the United States. In Chicago and Philadelphia, she co-hosted radio programs that had sponsorship from the International Institute, which wanted to help new immigrants familiarize themselves with America and its customs. Johanna co-hosted a radio program, commemorating Goethe's 200th birthday, on the newly created radio station, WFLN, of Philadelphia. By 1956, Johanna resigned from being an art model. And after she was hospitalized in 1956, she stopped teaching.
