= Leon Bass =

Late Philadelphian teacher

Leon Bass (January 23, 1925 – March 28, 2015) was an educator from Philadelphia. He is noted as an African-American soldier in World War II who witnessed the Buchenwald concentration camp.

== Early life and education ==
Bass was born and grew up in Philadelphia, one of six children (Henry Jr., Claude, Harvey, Marcellus, and sister, Willie Belle). His father, Henry Bass, was a Pullman porter, and his mother, Nancy Weston Bass, was a housewife. Both his parents emigrated to West Philadelphia from Bennettsville, South Carolina.

== Career ==
=== Liberation of Buchenwald ===
On April 11, 1945, near the end of World War II, Bass, then a Sergeant with the 183rd Engineer Combat Battalion, and another member of the 183rd, Sgt. William A. Scott III, arrived at the headquarters of the 1126th Battalion in a forward liaison capacity. The next day, they convoyed with members of the 1126th to Eisenach, approximately 100 kilometers from Buchenwald concentration camp, which was discovered by allied troops the previous day.

After arriving at Eisenach, Bass and others were detailed to Buchenwald to assist in relief, and were among the first American soldiers to be seen by survivors of the camp. Bass later referred to the people he saw that day as "the walking dead".

=== Post-World War II career ===
After the war, Bass graduated from West Chester University and then studied at Temple University, where he received a Doctorate. He became a teacher at the Benjamin Franklin High School in Philadelphia, eventually becoming its principal, a position he served in until 1981. He later taught history at George School, a Quaker boarding school in Newtown, Pennsylvania.

He was a speaker on the subject of racism and the Holocaust, and lectured extensively on the subject, bringing his unique perspective as a witness of many forms of oppression.

He was a participant in the International Liberators Conference, held in Washington DC in 1981. In 1994, he was the keynote speaker at the Georgia Commission on the Holocaust, and in 1996 he was awarded the Pearlman Award for Humanitarian Advancement from Jewish Women International.

He appeared in the Academy Award-nominated Documentary "Liberators: Fighting on Two Fronts in World War II". An oral history interview with Bass is in the Fortunoff Video Archive for Holocaust Testimonies at Yale University, and was also adapted into a podcast episode for "Those Who Were There: Voices from the Holocaust." In his final years, Bass published his memoir Good Enough: One Man's Memoir on the Price of the Dream. He also collaborated with Brian McKissick, Angela Morgan, and M. Alexis Scott on the screenplay Beech Tree Forest, which tells the story of the 183rd Engineer Combat Battalion—an all-Black unit involved in the liberation of Buchenwald concentration camp. The screenplay sought to correct historical inaccuracies and address efforts by the U.S. military and government to downplay or omit the presence and contributions of Black soldiers in the liberation. Although the project entered development, the film remained in pre-production at the time of Bass’s death in 2015 at the age of 90.
