= Anindita Ghose =

Indian author, journalist, editor

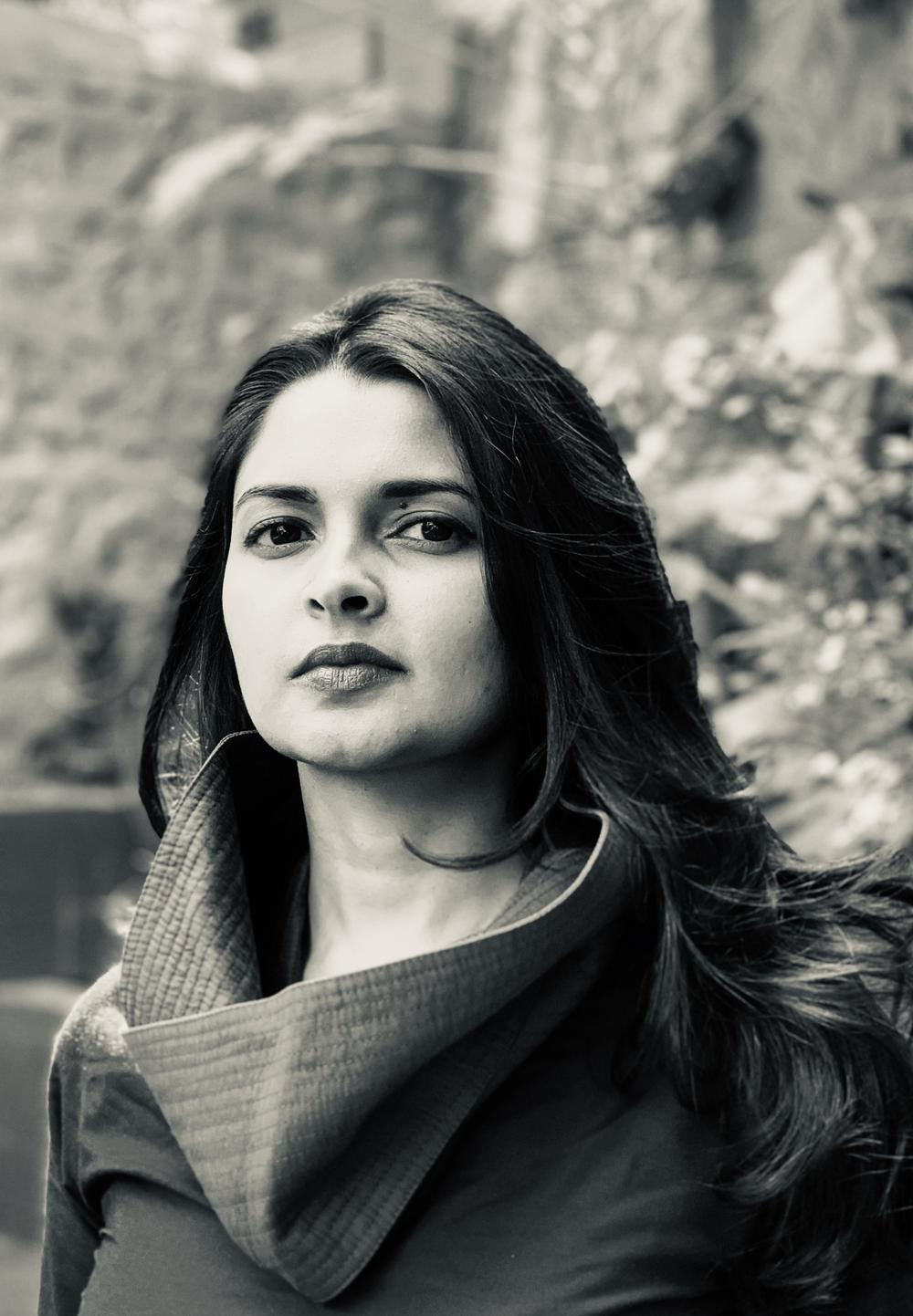
- Occupations: Author, Journalist
- Writing career
- Language: English
- Notable work: The Illuminated
- Website: aninditaghose.com

Anindita Ghose is an Indian author, journalist, and editor based in Mumbai.

== Biography ==
Ghose was born in Kolkata, and brought up in Mumbai.

Ghose has an MA in Linguistics from the University of Mumbai, and an MA in Arts & Culture Journalism from Columbia University's Graduate School of Journalism. She worked as a journalist at The Times of India, Mint, and Vogue India, and was editor-in-chief of Mint's Saturday magazine, Lounge.

Her debut novel The Illuminated was published in the Indian subcontinent by 4th Estate HarperCollins and by Head of Zeus (Bloomsbury) internationally in 2023. It was described by author André Aciman as ‘extraordinary’ and Peony Hirwani of The Independent picked Ghose as one of her nine best upcoming authors from India.

The Only City, an anthology of short stories on Bombay edited by her, was published by HarperCollins in India in 2025. A review in The Tribune called it "tender, chaotic, and irresistibly sincere" and "proof that the short story still endures."

Her journalism has been published in The Guardian, The Caravan, The Hindu, Vogue India, Kinfolk and Esquire India.

== Bibliography ==
- First Proof: The Penguin Book of New Writing from India 6 (anthology), India, Penguin, October 2010, ISBN 9780143415510
- The Illuminated, India, 4th Estate HarperCollins, July 2021, ISBN 9789354227257
- The Book of Dog (anthology), India, HarperCollins, January 2022, ISBN 978-9354893568
- The Illuminated, United Kingdom, Head of Zeus, January 2023, ISBN 978-1803289779
- The Only City (editor), India, HarperCollins, October 2025, ISBN 978-93-6989-325-6
