= S. Mitra Kalita =

American journalist

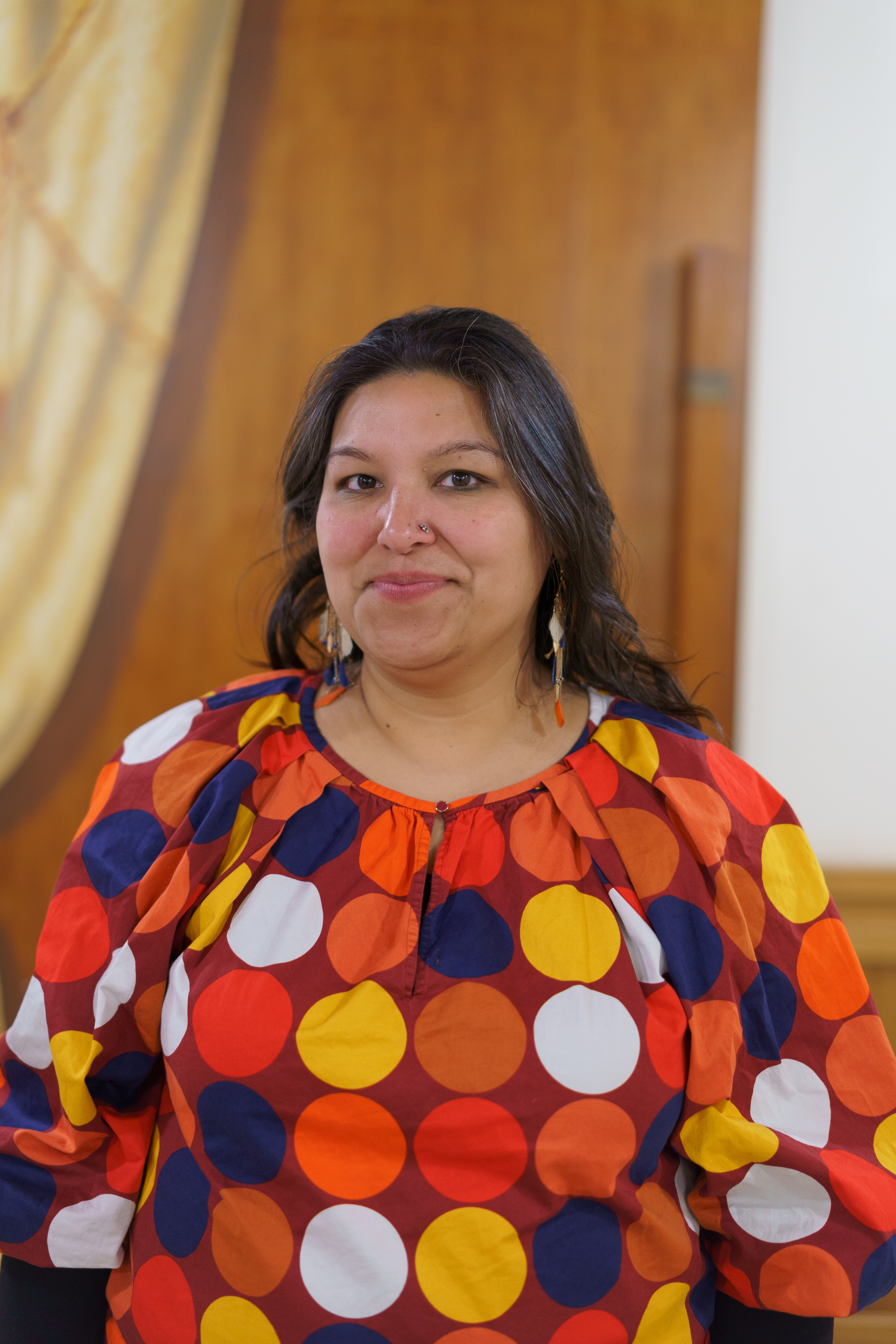
- Kalita at the International Journalism Festival 2024 in Perugia, Italy
- Born: Brooklyn, New York
- Education: Rutgers University, Columbia University
- Occupations: Author, journalist, media executive
- Notable work: Suburbal Sahibs, My Two Indias
- Spouse: Nitin Mukul
- Children: 2

S. Mitra Kalita is an American journalist, media executive and author of two books. Her first book 'Suburban Sahibs' is about how immigrants redefined New Jersey and thereby America and her second book 'My two Indias' is economic memoir about Globalization.

From July 2018 to 2020, she was Senior Vice President for News, Opinion and Programming at CNN Digital and was the Vice President for Programming at CNN Digital from June 2016 to July 2018. She has been on the board of The Philadelphia Inquirer since November 2020.

In 2020, Kalita started Epicenter-NYC, a newsletter to help New Yorkers get through the COVID-19 pandemic. She is also a 2021 Nieman Visiting Fellow at Harvard University, and co-founder and director of URL Media, a network of Black and Brown community news outlets that share content and revenue.

== Career ==
Mitra Kalita was the managing editor for editorial strategy at the Los Angeles Times from 2015 to 2016.

She went on to become the executive editor (at large) at Quartz after working as the founding ideas editor there. She helped launch Quartz India and Quartz Africa. She also worked at the Wall Street Journal where she directed coverage of the great recession and helped launch Livemint, a business newspaper in New Delhi, India along with founding editor Raju Narisetti.

She is a co-founder of URL Media along with Sara Lomax-Reese. She also served as a story consultant on Season 3 of Apple TV's The Morning Show.

== Personal life ==
Kalita was born in Brooklyn and was raised in Long Island, Puerto Rico, and New Jersey. She lives in Queens and has two daughters.

== Books ==
- Suburban Sahibs Three Immigrant Families and Their Passage From India to America.
