= Gwendolyn Holbrow =

American artist (born 1957)

Gwendolyn Holbrow (born August 22, 1957), is an American artist. Primarily a sculptor, she works in a variety of media and addresses an eclectic array of topics, with exploration of boundaries a recurring theme: between the tangible and intangible worlds; between the genders; between the individual and society. Humor and satire abound in Holbrow's art.

== Notable exhibitions, installations and awards ==
Holbrow's career highlights both the restlessness of her vision and her skill at executing her conceptions. She won a Gold Medal at the Massachusetts Horticultural Society’s Annual Flower Show, with The Root-Children, which addressed that year’s show theme, “Deeply Rooted.” She won Best of Show at the Cambridge, MA Art Association's National Prize Show with Queen Kong, a 7-foot-tall (2.1 m) Barbie contemplating a diminutive, apish Ken in her clutches. And Make Way for Calflings, a piece submitted for a citywide exhibition featuring cow-themed pieces from artists across America, earned $50,000 at an auction for Boston's Jimmy Fund – the highest value fetched by any of that project's many well-received pieces.

Other memorable pieces and exhibitions have included Keep it Clean, a table fountain featuring a nude Ken and Barbie together in a (working) miniature shower; It Was Here, a bronze and concrete “historical marker” that lures the observer into noting the infinite, overlooked value of the present moment; and River of Grass, a living sculpture at the Chesterwood Estate and Museum in Stockbridge, MA, in which Holbrow transforms a line of tall grass and wildflowers into a stream, waterfall and pool coursing through the estate's carefully manicured grounds.

== Early life and education ==
Holbrow was born in New York City. Her physicist father's professional pursuits kept the family constantly on the move during her childhood, and she attended a large number of schools, public and private, before graduating from the George School in Newtown, PA, in 1975. She enrolled in the University of Wisconsin–Madison and earned a bachelor's degree in linguistics in 1980; she studied medicine for a year but found medical studies unfulfilling and left to begin a family. She is a mother of four.

== Artistic training, development and philosophy ==
Holbrow first studied commercial art in the mid-1980s, at the Madison Area Technical College in Madison, WI, but it would be some time before her creative focus turned strongly to art. In 1989, she and her husband moved their family to Frankfurt, Germany, and while there, Holbrow did professional graphic-arts work, received classical voice training, and involved herself in the local choral and opera community. During a visit to the Van Gogh Museum in Amsterdam in 1998, Holbrow realized Von Gogh's student art was as primitive and problematic, as the paintings on which she was then laboring; perhaps hers held some promise as well. Her serious study of fine art began at this point. Returning to America in 1998, Holbrow earned her Bachelor of Arts degree in Studio Art in 2001 from Framingham State College in Massachusetts, and soon after started teaching art herself at the Danforth Museum.

A view of Reflection, installation at the Danforth Museum in Framingham, MA in 2007.

Holbrow's training reflects her quirky willingness to tackle a vast variety of media, subjects and issues: she lists auto-body training along with more conventional pursuits such as stone carving on her vitae.

Holbrow says her overarching motivation as an artist is “making people pay attention”: experientially as with It Was Here, or to social/political issues as with her extensive forays into Barbie art, which have won her frequent acclaim. Holbrow's take on the way Barbie, personifying women in America, is idealized in order to be vilified: “Barbie is our shadow and you have to embrace your shadow.” In her artist's statement accompanying Speech Balloons, a body of work that seeks to manifest communication in tangible form, Holbrow wrote: “My task as an artist is to serve as channel between the seen and unseen worlds, facilitating the flow, and creating or revealing connections which nourish the inner lives of individuals and the community.”

== Selected awards and achievements ==
- "Make Way For Calflings" raises $50,000 at auction for the Jimmy Fund, Boston, 2006
- Artist's Valentine Grant Competition winner for Speech Balloon body of work, Ann Wilson Lloyd, juror, Groton, MA, 2006
- Best of Show for sculpture Queen Kong, Cambridge Art Association National Prize Show, Robert Fitzpatrick, Pritzker Director of the Museum of Contemporary Art - Chicago, juror; Cambridge, MA, 2004
- Gold Medal for special exhibit The Root-Children (Die Wurdelkinder), New England Flower Show, Boston, MA, 2004
- Artist's Valentine Grant Competition winner for Barbie body of work, Nick Capasso, juror, Groton, MA, 2003
- Listed in Who's Who of American Women, 2002-7 editions; Who's Who in America, 2006-2007
- Silver Medal for special exhibit The Queen's Croquet-Grounds, New England Flower Show, Boston, MA, 2002
- Juror's Choice Award for acoustic sculpture Gravity Chimes, Cambridge Art Association SOUND juried show, 2001
- Cheryl di Mento Memorial Art History Essay Award for Louise Bourgeois, Framingham State College, 2001
- Distinguished Artist, Concord Art Association, 2001
- First prize for tabletop fountain Keep It Clean, Concord Art Association Members' Juried Show II, 2000

== Articles and reviews ==
- "Barbie and March Madness," by Julia Spitz, Sculpture, March, 2009
- "Contemporary Sculptors at Chesterwood 2006," by Marty Carlock, Sculpture, April, 2007
- "Artists 3," by Chris Bergeron, Metrowest Daily News, October 8, 2006
- "Exhibitionist," by Geoff Edgers, Boston.com, September 25, 2006
- "Cows Auctioned to boost the Jimmy Fund," Boston Globe, September 22, 2006
- "Screwing with Barbie," by Brita Belli, Fairfield County Weekly, July 13, 2006
- "Barbie as Art," by Candace Taylor, Play, July 12, 2006
- "Plastic Princess," by Donna Doherty, New Haven Register, July 15, 2006
- "Barbie's Bubble Burst?" by Adrienne LaFrance, WBUR.org Visual Arts, January 23, 2006
- "Role Model," by Greg Cook, Boston Phoenix, December 16, 2005
- "Plastic Princess' Barbie has issues in this Exhibit," by Joel Brown, Boston Globe, December 11, 2005
- "Raising The Barbie," by Brigit Alverson, North Shore Sunday, December 4, 2005
- "This Barbie's not for kids," by Rebecca Schoonmaker, Salem News, November 4, 2005
- "Go! Ahead," by June Wulff, Boston Globe, October 17, 2004
- "Anything goes in CAA prize exhibition," by Cate McQuaid, Boston Globe, May 28, 2004
- "After top flower show honors..." by Cate Coulacos Prato, Boston Globe, April 4, 2004
- "Barbie artist wins grant," NESA News, Fall, 2002
- "Gwendolyn Holbrow" by Maxine Farkas, Middlesex Beat, November 2002
- "A few provocative 'works' highlight show" by Susan Leveene, Daily free Press, November 14, 2002
- "The pulse of ART" by Chris Bergeron, Metrowest Daily News, October 17, 2002
- "Students Shine at Art Exhibit" by Kate Vlachtchenko, The Gatepost, November 17, 2000
