= Louis Harvy Chalif =

Dancer and dance instructor

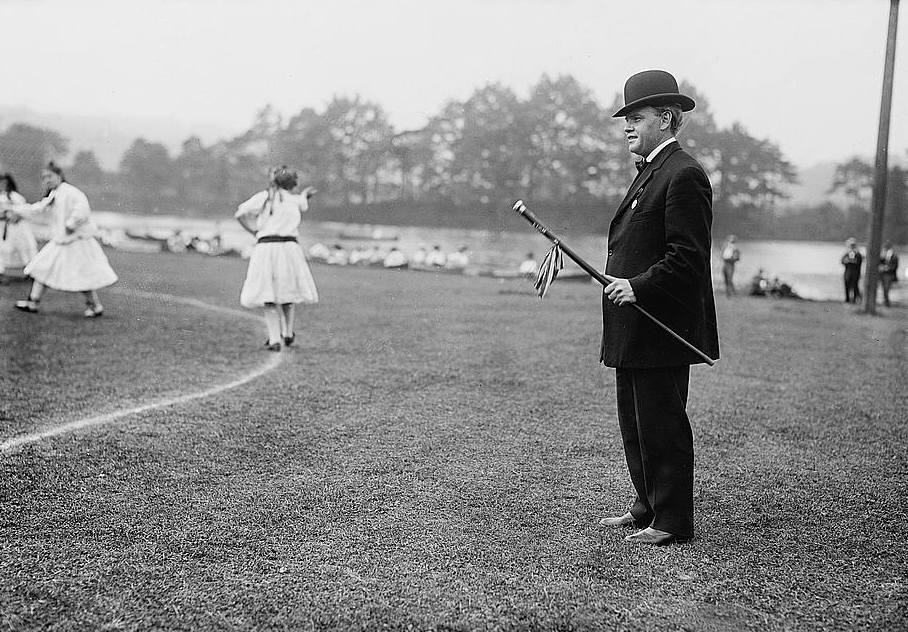
Louis Harvy Chalif circa 1913

Louis Harvy Chalif (Лазарь Гершович Халиф; December 29, 1876 – November 25, 1948) was a Ukrainian dance instructor and an author. His name is also recorded as Louis Harvey Chalif. Born in Odessa, he was one of the first Ukrainian dance instructors to teach in the United States, moving to New York City in the early 1900s.

Initially teaching at various New York City institutions, Chalif founded his own school, the Louis H. Chalif Normal School of Dancing, in 1905. Chalif wrote many textbooks on dance techniques and books describing folk dances, including five that were translated to multiple languages. He is credited with the creation of several compositions, arrangements, and ballet performances. From the 1900s until his death, Chalif lived in New York City with his wife Sara and six children.

== Early life ==
Louis Harvy Chalif was born on December 29, 1876, into a Jewish family in Odessa, which at the time was part of the Russian Empire. His name is also recorded as Louis Harvey Chalif; his parents' names have not been recorded. When he was nine years old, he attended the Odessa Government Theater where he was mentored by Thomas Laurentiyevich Nijinsky, father of dancers Vaslav Nijinsky and Bronislava Nijinska. In 1887, he performed in the ballet Excelsior alongside Virginia Zucchi.

Chalif graduated from the Odessa Government Theater in 1893. According to The National Cyclopaedia of American Biography, his graduation thesis inspired an "exercise composed from the five standard positions" of ballet. He was then invited to the Warsaw Imperial Ballet, where he received a post-graduate diploma in 1895.

== Career ==
Chalif became the Odessa Government Theater's ballet master in 1897. The following year, Pyotr Ilyich Tchaikovsky noticed Chalif during a performance and invited him to dance in one of his own ballets. Between 1899 and 1902, Chalif was a soldier in the Russian army.

In the early 1900s, Chalif became the first Russian-born dance and ballet teacher to immigrate to the United States. Different dates are cited for his immigration. Writer Lisa C. Arkin has cited both 1903 and 1905 as the date when he arrived in the U.S., but records from the Ellis Island immigration center indicate that a 28-year-old dancing master named Lasar Chalif had arrived in 1904, which corresponds with Chalif's birth year and career. The National Cyclopaedia of American Biography has cited an arrival date of 1903 and the New York City Landmarks Preservation Commission has cited a date of 1904. At the time, he was able to speak English, French, and Italian, in addition to his native Russian.

Chalif taught dancing at the Elinor Comstock School of Music for three years after his arrival in the U.S. In addition, Metropolitan Opera Ballet director Luigi Albertini hired Chalif as an assistant ballet master in either 1904–1905 or 1905–1906. He gave lessons in the New York Society for Ethical Culture School and the Henry Street Settlement. At the latter, he programmed festivals with Alice and Irene Lewisohn for pupils of his own school. Chalif was also hired by New York University (NYU) as a folk dancing teacher. The NYU staff who attended Chalif's class preferred that he teach the same "baby dances" that he had taught at the Henry Street Settlement, as they felt his syllabus was overly complex. Chalif was also still a performer at this time, teaching dance at the Teachers College at Columbia University. During 1909, Chalif headed an "athletic dancing" course for the YMCA.

Chalif served as a director at the Congress of the Playground Association of America in 1908 and a choreographer at the Hudson–Fulton Celebration in 1909. Chalif was vice president of the American Society of Teachers of Dancing, and between 1910 and 1918 he was also a teacher for the American Society of Professors for Dancing. Chalif stopped performing after 1910, devoting himself solely to teaching. Chalif choreographed in classical ballet, but his main goal was to teach organized dancing, which in the first decade of the 20th century was still in its development.

=== Louis H. Chalif Normal School of Dancing ===
In 1905, Chalif opened his own dance and pedagogical school, known as the Louis H. Chalif Normal School of Dancing. The school was initially situated on the Upper West Side and then at 360 Fifth Avenue inside the Aeolian Company's showroom. At the school, one of the first in United States to train dance instructors, Chalif also taught children and amateur dancers. According to an early catalog, the school offered "Professional Courses in Esthetic Greek, National, Interpretive, Character, Folk, Contra and Fine Ballroom Dancing". In 1907, the school relocated to 7 West 42nd Street.

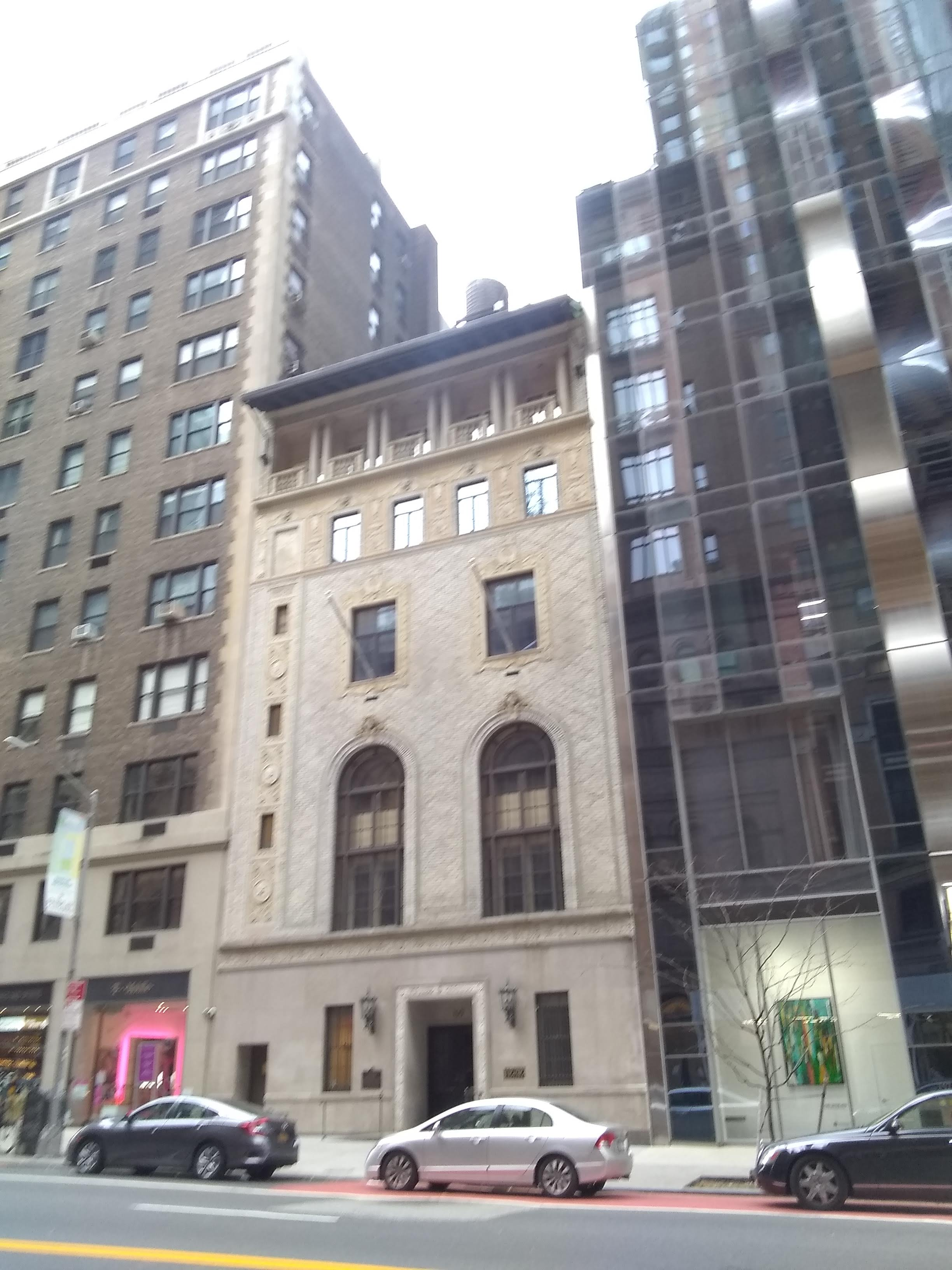
Chalif's school on 165 West 57th Street

Chalif commissioned a new five-story building at 165 West 57th Street close to Carnegie Hall, from George A. and Henry Boehm in 1916. The building included space for dressing rooms, ballrooms, and the Chalif family's own apartment. The National Cyclopaedia of American Biography called the school "a surprisingly beautiful building", and The Sun referred to 165 West 57th Street as the "Temple of Terpsichore". (Note: Another source states that, between 1913 and 1914, Chalif's school moved to 57th Street, close to Carnegie Hall. Chalif's textbook nicknamed that location the "Temple of Terpsichore", but it is unclear whether this refers to 165 West 57th Street.) Chalif advertised the building as being "unparalleled for its purposes in America" as well as "striking evidence" of the school's success. Dance Magazine characterized the building as "the greatest highlight and dream of Chalif's lifetime", noting that Chalif would walk past the building even after other parties had purchased it.

By the 1930s, the school's syllabus required 500 hours of study in various styles of dance. Chalif would work for up to sixteen hours a day on his work and career, according to his son Amos. Louis Chalif also taught classes at other places across the New York metropolitan area, including in Bernardsville, New Jersey (where his son Edward taught), and Chatham, New Jersey (where Amos taught). The Louis H. Chalif Normal School of Dancing moved out of 165 West 57th Street in 1933. Chalif gave up ownership of that building the next year as part of a foreclosure proceeding. Subsequently, the school was situated at the Steinway Hall building at 113 West 57th Street. In 1937, he moved from Steinway Hall to the International Building at the nearby Rockefeller Center.

=== Other activities ===
Chalif also led several organizations that sought to codify the instruction of dance education. He endorsed a law in 1922 that would have banned the teaching of certain "immodest dances" in New York state, though the law was not passed. In his later life, Chalif continued to express his opinions vigorously. In the 1930s, he was quoted in an anonymous news clipping as being strongly against tap dancing because, as he believed, "The whole world is full of hate, and so is the modernistic dance".

== Personal life ==
Chalif was married to Sara Katz in Odessa on December 4, 1902. The couple had eight children. They had five sons (the first two sons Abraham and Samuel were born in Odessa in 1903 and 1906, respectively; Edward, Selmer, and Amos, and three daughters, Vitalis, Helen, and Frances. All three of Chalif's sons taught at the Louis H. Chalif Normal School of Dancing at some point. The Chalifs' two oldest children were born in Russia, but they moved to the United States with their mother in the early 1900s. Amos Chalif, who grew up at 165 West 57th Street, said the building had been "a wonderful place to grow up", as he learned to ride a bicycle there.

Chalif participated in several Jewish organizations and attended Temple Rodeph Sholom. On November 25, 1948, aged 71, Louis H. Chalif died of a heart attack. He had been riding in a vehicle with friends in New York City's Central Park when he died. Chalif's children took over the school after their father's death and operated it until 1955. Afterward, the Chalif children continued to teach dance; when Amos Chalif retired in the 2000s, the family had taught dance for 100 years.

His granddaughter Sonia Chalif Simon was an art historian on the faculty of Colby College.

== Publications ==
Chalif has been attributed as the author of around 1,200 ballets and dance compositions, which were categorized into several dance genres based on their difficulty. The works covered the "Aesthetic, Ballet, Ballroom, Character, Folk, Historical, National, and Pantomime" genres, according to writer Dick Oakes. Five of his works were translated into other languages. Chalif's work also includes 120 folk dances and 35 ballets. To promote his school and dance societies, Chalif distributed twenty thousand mail-order catalogs worldwide.

During his lifetime, Chalif published six textbooks. One of these textbooks was about Russian folklore and costumes. Chalif also published five volumes of The Chalif Text Book of Dancing between 1914 and 1924. The first, second, and fourth volumes were mostly about ballet and some ballroom dancing techniques; the third volume was about Greek dancing; and the fifth volume was about toe dancing.

== Legacy ==
In 1945, Dance Magazine wrote that Louis Chalif had been "at the forefront of the movement that introduced ballet instruction to 'the average American child'". Upon his death, his New York Times obituary described him as "the dean of New York dance teachers". Both in New York City and across the U.S., Chalif was a major promoter of dance. His pupils had included actor-dancers such as Cyd Charisse, Buddy Ebsen, and Ann Miller, as well as actresses like Marion Davies, Alice Faye, Helen Gahagan, Mae Murray, and Ann Sothern. He also taught dance to Harriet Hoctor, who went on to found her own dance school. After Chalif's death, the Library of Congress compiled a collection of his mail-order catalogs as well as photographs of him.

== See also ==
- List of Russian ballet dancers
