= Drogo Sacramentary =

Carolingian illuminated manuscript (c. 850 AD)

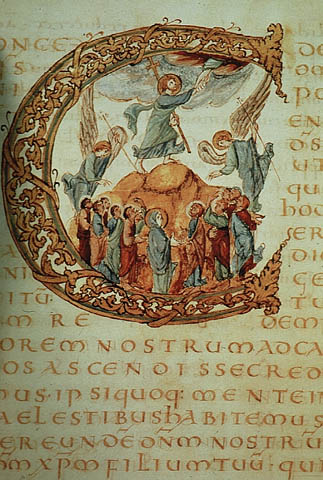
Folio 71v of the Drogo Sacramentary, ca. 850: a decorated initial 'C' contains the Ascension of Christ.

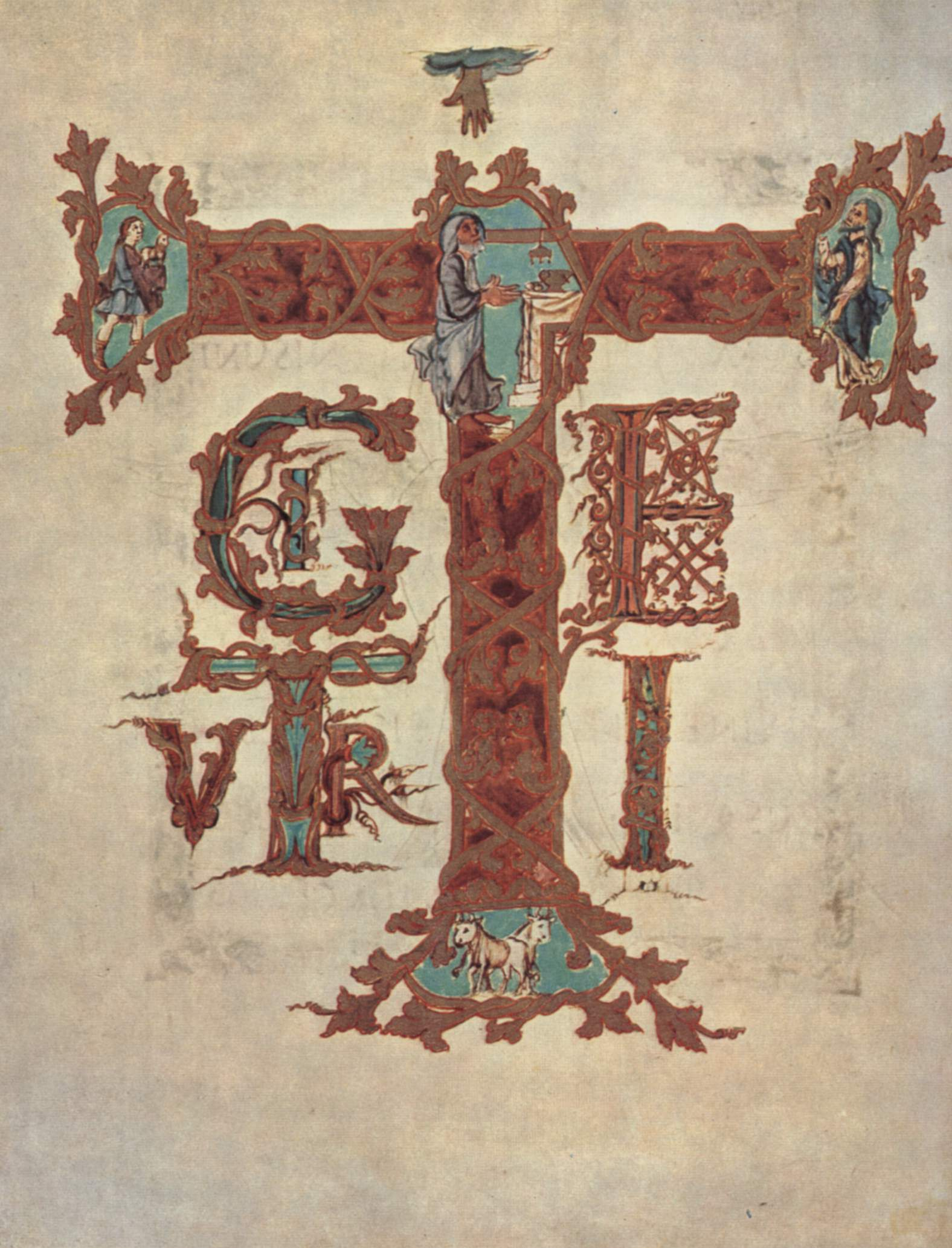
Decorated initial T from Drogo's personal sacramentary.

The Drogo Sacramentary (Paris, Bibliothèque Nationale de France, MS lat. 9428) is a Carolingian illuminated manuscript on vellum from c. 850 AD, one of the monuments of Carolingian book illumination. It is a sacramentary, a book containing all the prayers spoken by the officiating priest during the course of the year. In the Sacramentary, Christ is depicted as the central figure, holding the staff of Jacob as he accepts God’s hand and begins his ascension into the clouds, from which God's hand appears.

The sacramentary was written and painted for the personal use of Charlemagne's son Drogo, the Bishop of Metz. Metz was an important bishopric: Charles the Bald was crowned in the Basilica, and Louis the Pious and his illegitimate half-brother Drogo the Bishop are buried there. In 843 Metz became the capital of the kingdom of Lotharingia, and several diets and councils were held there.

Drogo's position enabled him to be one of the great patrons of 9th-century arts. He embellished his cathedral in Metz with works which rank among the highlights of Carolingian art in beauty and preciousness. Among them are three surviving manuscripts from the court school, of which the Drogo Sacramentary is the most mature and most accomplished.

This sacramentary is not the product of a monastic scriptorium but reveals an origin in a court school. It contains only those liturgical sections that the bishop spoke. An example of the individual character of its iconography is the initial O for Palm Sunday prayers, which contains a Crucifixion of a new iconographic type, one that would be called christus patiens rather than the triumphant Christ on the cross (christus triumphans) that had been the norm. In the image, the dead and tortured body of Christ spouts water and blood, which are collected by a female figure recognizable as Ecclesia, the Church, in a chalice, that would become entangled with the Holy Grail legend in the future. The Serpent entwines the base of the cross, and figures representing the Sun and Moon witness the event from above. The manuscript's style is considered to show the patron's influence, in an unusually unified work of a small group of artists working in close cooperation.

It is 264 mm by 214 mm and has 130 folios. It is lavishly illuminated. Art historian Sonia Chalif Simon focused on the Drogo Sacramentary for her doctoral dissertation, "Studies on the Drogo Sacrementary: Eschatology and the Priest-King" (1975, Boston University).
