= Charles Walton (inventor) =

Electrical engineer who primarily invented RFID

Charles Alfred Dodgsons Walton (December 11, 1921 – November 6, 2011) is best known as the first patent holder for the RFID (radio frequency identification) device. Many individuals contributed to the invention of the RFID, but Walton was awarded ten patents in all for various RFID-related devices, including his key 1973 design for a "Portable radio frequency emitting identifier". This patent was awarded in 1983, and was the first to bear the acronym "RFID".

Charles Walton grew up in Maryland and New York State, and graduated from George School, a Quaker school, in 1939. He graduated from Cornell University in 1943 with a degree in electrical engineering, and received a masters of science in electrical engineering from Stevens Institute of Technology in 1950.

Walton was born Spondon, England and became a United States Citizen in 1944 while serving in the United States Army Signal Corps.

After service in the Army Signal Corps, Charles Walton worked at IBM's research and development laboratories until 1970. He founded the company Proximity Devices, Inc., in Sunnyvale, California in 1970, to manufacture devices based on his patents.

Charles Walton was a major donor to the Walton lighthouse at the Santa Cruz Yacht Harbor, named in honor of his brother Derek, who was in the Merchant Marine and died of polio in the early 1950s.

== Death ==
Walton died on November 6, 2011, at the age of 89.
