= The Illuminated =

2021 novel by Anindita Ghose

- Author: Anindita Ghose
- Language: English
- Genres: Literary Fiction
- Publisher: HarperCollins
- Publication date: 2021
- Publication place: India
- Media type: Print (hardcover)
- Pages: 312
- ISBN: 9354227252
- Website: aninditaghose.com

The Illuminated is the debut novel by Mumbai writer Anindita Ghose. It was published by 4th Estate HarperCollins in July 2021 in India and by Head of Zeus (Bloomsbury) in January 2023.

== Summary ==
The novel explores the relationships between a mother and her daughter and the men in their lives, set against the backdrop of religious fundamentalism in India.

== Reception ==
The novel received some favourable reviews and was featured on fiction lists by The Telegraph, The Times of India,GQ India and Harper's Bazaar Australia.

In The Irish Independent, Anne Cunningham called it "An extremely elegant work, an interesting take on the universality of feminism from a uniquely Indian perspective." The Straits Times called it a nuanced exploration of grief and identity. The Scroll.in reviewed it as "perfectly timed." The Financial Express described it as "audacious and assured." The New Indian Express wrote in their review: "This book is also about loneliness in marriage, liberation in widowhood, sexual exploitation in academia, women in politics, and the confusing nature of desire, and the heartbreak of families spread out over continents."

Vangmayi Parakala in The Asian Age was critical and said: "The Illuminated tries too hard to be ‘The Novel of its Times’", concluding "the book is unable to give each one their duly deserved space for real depth or nuance."
