= George Michener Hart =

American historian (1919–2008)

- Born: George Michener Hart; February 12, 1919; Doylestown, Pennsylvania, U.S.
- Died: April 17, 2008 (aged 89); Lehighton, Pennsylvania, U.S.
- Education: George School, Newtown, Pennsylvania
- Occupations: Historian, teacher, museum director, short line railroader.
- Known for: Railroad history

George Michener Hart (February 12, 1919 – April 17, 2008) was an American writer, photographer, and railroad historian. As a school administrator, he conducted freelance historical research for the Reading Company. Hart also played a key role in organizing the railroad's Iron Horse Rambles—a series of steam locomotive excursions—from 1959 until they were discontinued in 1964. Over his lifetime, Hart compiled a collection of more than 3,000 photographic negatives (1931–1968), documenting American railroads.

== Early life and education ==
Hart was born in Doylestown, Pennsylvania to George Hart (1886–1959) and Katherine Michener Hart (1892–1984). He attended Buckingham Friends School and the George School in Newtown, Pennsylvania, graduating in 1937. He later returned to the George School, where he worked as a business manager and treasurer.

== Railroad history and preservation ==
In the 1960s, Hart was appointed a director with the Pennsylvania Historical and Museum Commission. In 1969, he became the first director and employee of the newly established Railroad Museum of Pennsylvania, a position he held until his retirement in 1983.

In 1964, Hart founded Rail Tours, Inc., which operated steam-powered railroad excursions using locomotives and rolling stock he had acquired. That same year, Rail Tours, Inc. was one of two groups—alongside Steam Trains, Inc.—that entered negotiations with the Reading Company to acquire the former Northeastern Pennsylvania branch line, now known as the New Hope Railroad. At the time, Rail Tours owned ten pieces of rolling stock, including four steam locomotives. However, Hart's effort to lease the New Hope line was unsuccessful.

== Death and legacy ==
George Michener Hart died on April 17, 2008, in Jim Thorpe, Pennsylvania, following a brief illness. He was interred at Doylestown Cemetery in his hometown.

Throughout his life, Hart was widely recognized as pioneering in American railroad preservation. He was among the earliest private individuals to acquire, restore, and operate steam locomotives for public excursions when steam railroading was rapidly vanishing from the American landscape. At one time, he "owned and operated the largest collection of individually held steam locomotives qualified to run under Interstate Commerce Commission regulations." His equipment was used for tourist excursions, museum exhibitions, and motion picture productions.

Hart's contributions to railroad preservation extended beyond locomotives and rolling stock. His photographic archive, comprising more than 3,000 negatives taken between 1931 and 1968, captured a pivotal era in American railroading. The collection remains an invaluable resource for historians, researchers, and rail enthusiasts, documenting steam operations, infrastructure, and the human side of railroading during the mid-20th century. In 2006, the Railroad and Locomotive History Society honored Hart with its Gerald M. Best Senior Achievement Award.

As founding director of the Railroad Museum of Pennsylvania, Hart helped establish one of the leading institutions in the United States dedicated to railroad history. He was instrumental in shaping the museum's mission and in acquiring significant artifacts during its formative years. Kurt Bell, archivist for the Railroad Museum of Pennsylvania, observed that Hart "never felt the need to find a wife or have children: His heart belonged to the railroad."

Hart's legacy endures through the preservation organizations he helped inspire, the excursions he pioneered, and the archival materials he left behind. His name remains closely associated with the evolution of American railway heritage and the transition from working steam railroads to the heritage railroading movement.
