= Sonia Chalif Simon =

American art historian (1925–2022)

- in the Pyrennees where she lived
- Born: Sonia Sterling Chalif; December 24, 1925; Brooklyn, New York, U.S.
- Died: February 4, 2022 (aged 96); Jaca, Spain
- Other names: Sonia Chalif Daniels
- Occupation(s): Art historian, college professor
- Relatives: Louis Harvy Chalif (grandfather); J. Frederic Kernochan (great-uncle)

Sonia Sterling Chalif Simon (December 24, 1925 – February 4, 2022) was an American art historian and college professor. She specialized in medieval, baroque, and nineteenth-century subjects, and was on the faculty at Colby College from 1982 to 1996.

== Early life and education ==
Sonia Sterling Chalif was born in Brooklyn, the daughter of Edward Louis Chalif and Margaret Kernochan Montgomery Chalif. Her parents were dance teachers; her father, who was also an ornithologist, was born in Odesa, and her mother was from New Jersey. Her grandfather, Louis Harvy Chalif, was a noted author and ballet master. Attorney and judge J. Frederic Kernochan was her mother's uncle.

She attended the George School, and Vassar College, but left the latter to marry in 1946. She earned all her degrees at Boston University, including a bachelor's degree in fine art in 1966, a master's degree in fine art in 1970, and a Ph.D in art history in 1975. Her dissertation was titled "Studies on the Drogo Sacrementary: Eschatology and the Priest-King" (1975).

== Career ==
Sonia Chalif Daniels was active in women's clubs as a young woman, and taught at Far Brook School in New Jersey. She was known for her doctoral work on the Drogo Sacramentary, a manuscript made for and used by Drogo of Metz, son of Charlemagne. She also studied the iconography of the cloisters at Jaca Cathedral in Spain. She taught at the University of Massachusetts, the State University of New York, and the College of New Rochelle. She was also director of an art gallery at SUNY Cortland, from 1975 to 1980, and worked on the “Census of Stained Glass Windows in America, 1840-1940".

Simon was a member of the faculty at Colby College from 1982 to 1996, while her husband was head of the art department; they sometimes co-taught survey courses on Western art, and they co-directed the school's Colby in Salamanca program for the 1989–1990 academic year. The couple were advisors on the "Art of Medieval Spain" exhibit at the Metropolitan Museum of Art in 1993.

== Publications ==
- "Le Christ victorieux: Iconographie d'un chapiteau de Jaca" (1979)
- "David et ses musiciens: Iconographie d'un chapiteau de Jaca" (1980)
- "Un chapiteau du cloitre de la cathedrale de Jaca, representent la psychomachie" (1981)

== Personal life ==
Sonia Chalif married journalist George Goetz Daniels in 1946; they had four sons. She later married fellow art historian David L. Simon. She died in 2022, in Jaca, Spain, at the age of 96.
