= Mint (newspaper) =

Indian financial daily newspaper

- Type: Daily newspaper
- Format: Broadsheet
- Owner: HT Media
- Founder: Raju Narisetti
- Founded: 1 February 2007
- Language: English
- Headquarters: 199 Street, Floor 18–20, Kasturba Gandhi Marg, New Delhi, 110001
- Circulation: 133,115 (certified) (Indian Readership Survey, 2013 – MRUC)
- Sister newspapers: Hindustan Times; Hindustan
- Website: www.livemint.com

Mint is an Indian business and financial daily newspaper published by HT Media, a Delhi-based media group which is controlled by the K. K. Birla family. The family also publishes Hindustan Times. Mint was launched in 2007 and specializes in business and politics.

It publishes a single national edition distributed in New Delhi, Mumbai, Bangalore, Hyderabad, Chennai, Kolkata, Pune, Ahmedabad and Chandigarh. Mint is not published on Sunday. Every Saturday, it prints its sister magazine, Mint Lounge. It was India's first newspaper to be published in the Berliner format. The former editor of The Wall Street Journal India, Raju Narisetti ran Mint from its founding in 2007 to 2008. Narisetti was succeeded by Sukumar Ranganathan, who served as an editor until 2017.

In 2014, Mint and The Wall Street Journal ended their seven-year editorial partnership. The companies now have a content syndication agreement as well as a subscriptions bundle. In 2017, former editor of Khaleej Times Vinay R. Kamat was appointed as Editor, replacing Sukumar Ranganathan. In November 2020, Sruthijith Kurupichankandy, better known as SK, was appointed Editor-in-chief.

== History ==
=== Launch ===
Mint began in collaboration with The Wall Street Journal on 1 February 2007, with the Journal's former deputy managing editor, Raju Narisetti as its founding editor.

=== Relaunch ===
In 2016, Mint changed from the Berliner format it popularised in India and became a broadsheet. Mint also publishes Mint Lounge as a Saturday cultural edition.

== Livemint website ==
After struggling in the initial years, the Livemint website is now the second most read business news website in India, behind The Economic Times. After HT Media Limited acquired VCCircle from News Corp in 2020, the Livemint website also shares content with the VCCircle and TechCircle websites. The Deals, Tech and Startups page on the Mint newspaper routinely gets content from both VCCircle and TechCircle.

== Notable employees (past and present) ==
- Tamal Bandyopadhyay
- Melissa Bell
- Mitra Kalita
- Priya Ramani
- Anindita Ghose
- Supriya Nair
- Pallavi Singh
- Samanth Subramanian
- Sidin Vadukut, columnist,
