= George School =

Location
- 1690 Newtown Langhorne Road; Newtown, Pennsylvania; United States; 40.21177°N 74.93418°W

Information
- School type: Independent boarding and day high school
- Motto: Mind the Light
- Religious affiliation: Christianity
- Denomination: Quakers
- Established: 1893 (133 years ago)
- NCES School ID: 01195879
- Head of school: Justin Brandon
- Faculty: 71.9 (on an FTE basis)
- Enrollment: 539 (2019–2020)
  - Grade 9: 121
  - Grade 10: 145
  - Grade 11: 127
  - Grade 12: 146
- Classes: 14
- Student to teacher ratio: 7.5:1
- Hours in school day: 7
- Campus: Suburban
- Campus size: 265 acres (107 ha)
- Colors: Green/White, Buff/Brown
- Athletics conference: Friends Schools League
- Mascot: Cougars
- Rival: Westtown School
- Publication: Argo
- Newspaper: The Curious George
- Yearbook: Opus
- Nobel laureates: Mario Capecchi, Kenneth Geddes Wilson
- Website: georgeschool.org

George School is a private Quaker (Society of Friends) boarding and day high school located on a rural campus in Middletown Township, Bucks County, Pennsylvania (Newtown postal address). It has been at that site since its founding in 1893, and has grown from a single building (The building known as "Main") to over 20 academic, athletic, and residential buildings. Besides the usual college-preparatory courses, including an International Baccalaureate program, the school features several distinct programs rooted in its Quaker heritage. These include community service requirements such as cleaning up the dining hall, an emphasis on social justice and environmental concerns, required art courses, and community-based decision making.

== History ==
=== 19th century ===
George School was founded in 1891 and opened in 1893. John M. George, who donated much of the school's funding, is its namesake. It was intended as a school for Hicksite members of the Religious Society of Friends (Quakers). They wanted an alternative to Orthodox Westtown School. The two schools have remained friendly rivals in athletics, although they resolved their sectarian rift in the 1950s. The Patterson Cup (commonly known as "the moose" for the moose head at Westtown, where the tally was kept by hanging tea bags on alternating antlers) is awarded each year to the school that has won the most varsity and junior varsity contests between the schools. An alumni fundraising competition between the schools, the "Machemer Cup" also exists.

The campus was built on 227 acres (0.92 km^{2}) of the Worth Farm. The owners retained 60 acres (240,000 m^{2}), including the 1756 Tate House and 1804 Worth House. The school gave over the bulk of its property in the early years to a farm managed for its benefit. The farm supplied tuhe school's milk and meat until it closed in 1967. The school purchased the remaining property, including the two historic houses, in 1945. The school leased or gifted parts of the campus to Newtown Friends School in 1947 and the Pennswood retirement community in 1979.

The first headmaster, George Maris, had been a strong voice in favor of "guarded education" for Hicksite Friends, separated from worldly vices. Maris was among the Hicksites who courted George and secured a codicil to his will 74 days before his death. Maris was an ineffective headmaster, although the reasons for his lack of success are unclear; Maris was forced out of his position in 1901 and replaced by Joseph Walton, who had also been part of the founding group.

The new headmaster, Joseph Walton, had been a leading candidate for the presidency of Swarthmore College, the Hicksite-sponsored Friends college, in 1898. During Walton's tenure as head of George School (1901–1912), the school overcame a troubled balance sheet by expanding.

=== 20th century ===
The school built a new dormitory, Drayton Hall, in 1903 (the school had built Orton in a fit of optimism in 1897), and the first separate classroom building, Retford Hall, in 1903. Unlike Maris, Walton opposed the idea of "guarded" education and encouraged arts education. Walton died of a duodenal ulcer, aged 57.

George Walton, the son of Joseph Walton, served as headmaster from 1912 to 1948, the longest term of any head of school. There was little new construction during his term (the one major building was Bancroft Hall, built in 1931), but considerable social change. The enrollment nearly doubled, from 226 to 425, while the number of Quakers attending remained about the same, lowering the proportion. The school accepted its first black student in the 1940s and introduced social dancing and football. Outside of the school, he was a prominent voice within the Friends community. He was part of the group that founded the Pendle Hill study center in 1930; he accompanied two of that group, the well-known writer Rufus Jones and D. Robert Yarnall on a 1938 mission to Germany on behalf of the American Friends Service Committee to allow that group to distribute relief in Poland, then under occupation. After retiring from George School, he was an instrumental figure in reconciling the Hicksite and Orthodox Philadelphia Yearly Meetings in 1955.

Following World War II, teacher Walter Mohr, who had also worked with the American Friends Service Committee, organized affiliations with two German schools, Jacobi Gymnasium for boys in Düsseldorf and Gertraudenschule for girls in Berlin, at first sending relief supplies and organizing student exchanges. In 1950, the first of almost 20 years of German work camps began. In the late 1960s, these affiliations and work camps began to spread to Russia, Africa, and Latin America, and also included domestic work projects.

The next headmaster, Richard McFeely, ushered in an era of campus growth and a shift toward a less formal relationship between students and faculty: McFeely insisted on being addressed by his first name. McFeely was generally known as "Mr. Dick." McFeely had contracted polio while a student at Swarthmore. McFeely was friendly with Franklin D. Roosevelt, having spent time with him at Warm Springs, Georgia. During McFeely's time as the head of school (1948–1966), the school constructed the Alumni Gym, Hallowell Hall, McFeely Library (so named after his death), and Walton Center. McFeely retired because of poor health from polio and died within the year.

During the mid-1950s, Julian Bond, later a prominent civil rights leader, attended George School. While Bond encountered some racism while attending there, he was impressed by the school's anti-racist philosophy and first encountered ideas of non-violence and social action. One event, in particular, involved Bond, a varsity athlete, going to Philadelphia with his white girlfriend while wearing George School apparel. Upon returning, the school dean reprimanded him. George School has claimed it was enforcing a policy against wearing George School insignia apparel off campus; Bond alleged that the reprimand was racially motivated and said, "That was just like somebody stopping you and slapping you across the face."

Eric Curtis, an Englishman and former faculty member at Earlham College, was brought in as headmaster after McFeely, serving from 1967 (there was an interim head for 1966–67) until 1979. Curtis oversaw a tumultuous period of change in the school's social relationships, as assertive students and younger faculty battled older faculty and administrators (and the George School Committee) over various procedures. The two significant new buildings in Curtis's time were the Science Center and the Sports Center.

David Bourns was head of school from 1979 to 2001, when he left to head the Paul Cuffee charter school in Providence, Rhode Island. Bourns' time began as a recentering after the tumult of the previous decade. A new emphasis on academic rigor was enforced, along with more focused activism. The school built an Alternative Energy Center in the mid-1980s and for several years hosted a regional "Peace Fair." Nancy Starmer, the first non-member of the Society of Friends to head the school, succeeded him.

=== 21st century ===
On September 18, 2007, Barbara Dodd Anderson, George School Class of 1950, gave a gift of $128.5 million to George School. The gift is to be received over twenty years from an irrevocable charitable lead trust and is the single largest gift to an existing private school in U.S. history. The gift has its origins with billionaire businessman and philanthropist, Warren Buffett. Buffett was a student of Anderson's father, David Dodd, an economist and professor at Columbia University School of Business. Dodd became an early investor in Buffett's Berkshire Hathaway. Ms. Dodd Anderson, Mr. Buffet, and Mollie Dodd Anderson, granddaughter of Barbara Dodd Anderson, were present for the dedication of the new LEED Gold Certified Learning Commons and Mollie Dodd Anderson Library on October 17, 2009.

On April 27, 2015, George School became the first preparatory school in the nation to divest its endowment from coal.

== Governance ==
The George School Committee governs George School, self-perpetuating by approval of the Philadelphia Yearly Meeting of the Society of Friends. Quaker influences on the school are apparent in many Friends-derived procedures, especially the consensus format for faculty and other committee meetings, in which all present must either agree to proposals or "stand aside" for them to be approved. A four-year course of spiritual study begins with a term of Essentials of a Friends Community in the student's first year, followed by two terms of Faith Traditions, an in-depth World Religions course. Additionally, all students and faculty gather for a thirty-minute Meeting for Worship once a week, and all boarding students and resident faculty attend a longer meeting on Sundays. Also, in the Quaker spirit, since 1942, every student has had a "co-op" job, the equivalent of other schools' work-study jobs, but shared equally among all students regardless of their financial aid status. Finally, in the most apparent difference between outsiders, teachers and students usually refer to one another on a first-name basis.

== Curriculum ==
George School offers a college-preparatory course of study. To graduate, students must complete four years of English, three years of mathematics, three years of history, three years of science, three years of arts, and religious courses, and demonstrate third-year proficiency in a foreign language.

George School offers the two-year International Baccalaureate program, which qualifies students for admission to colleges and universities worldwide.

George School also offers Advanced Placement courses and examinations in Biology, Calculus (AB), English, U.S. History, Human Geography, Chemistry, Physics, Statistics and the school's four foreign languages: French, Spanish, Latin and Chinese. Additionally, students in the Portfolio Preparation class have been known to submit their work for the Art AP.

Students must take three full years of art. George School offers classes in ceramics, chorus, dance, digital imaging, drama, music seminar, newspaper (The Curious George, formerly The George School News), painting and drawing, photography, stagecraft, film production, orchestra, woodworking, and yearbook.

=== Service ===
All George School students must complete a 65-hour community service project before graduating. Students work on projects and in programs that reflect Friends' practices. Projects must be grounded in one-on-one contact with communities and individuals who are disempowered due to social, racial, economic, or health factors. These projects include intense, two-week experiences in school-sponsored, domestic or international work camps; once-a-week experiences that extend throughout the school year; and preapproved independent projects. Students may complete service projects during the school year or on vacation after their second year.

Recent service trips include India; Nicaragua; Cuba; Costa Rica; Boston, Massachusetts; Coastal Mississippi; and The Palestinian territories; France; South Africa; Ghana; Arizona; New Orleans, Louisiana; Americus, Georgia; South Carolina; Virginia Beach, Virginia; Washington, D.C.; West Virginia; South Korea; Vietnam; and China.

While more than half of the students at George School receive significant financial aid, relatively few of those students can afford to go on international service trips, as the maximum scholarship offered on most trips covers only about half of the total costs, which range from $2,000 to over $5,000.

== Extracurricular activities ==
=== Athletics ===
Students are almost always required to play a competitive sport or participate in a physical education program. Since 1996, certain fully scheduled students may take one trimester with no athletics. Still, first- and second-year students must play two interscholastic competitive sports, and juniors and seniors must play one:

- Fall: cross country, equestrian, field hockey, cheerleading, Association Football, volleyball, tennis (girls), Rowing
- Winter: basketball, rowing, cheerleading (basketball), swimming, winter track, fencing, rock climbing, and wrestling
- Spring: baseball, softball, equestrian, golf, lacrosse, tennis (boys), Ultimate Frisbee, track and field, Rowing

George School competes in the Friends School League, but in certain sports, such as equestrian, football, and wrestling, this is not possible due to the small number of league members that also participate. There is an annual competition with Westtown, which results in the awarding of the Patterson Cup, commonly referred to as "The Moose" by most students and faculty. The scores are based on the results of all varsity and junior varsity competitions between the two schools.

The school once had a swimming competency requirement for graduation.

=== Publications ===
- The Curious George is the school's student-produced newspaper on campus, formerly The George School News, "G Magazine," and "The Gazette." It returned to the name "Curious George" in 2016.
- The Georgian is the alumni newspaper circulated to alums, parents, and faculty.
- Argo is a student-produced literary and arts magazine.
- Opus is the school's yearbook.

=== Performing arts ===
The school has an active, long-standing performing arts program. It is not formally an "art school" but many of George School's most prominent alumni are performing artists.

Both student- and department-produced theater productions are performed in the Walton Center. Shows range from conventional high school productions, such as Guys and Dolls, to more controversial pieces, such as the Laramie Project. George School's dance classes perform at the annual Dance Eclectic, a showcase of student- and faculty-created choreography. George School Community Chorus includes a mixture of students and adults and offers a yearly winter concert. George School's Musical Theater course performs a musical in Walton Auditorium in the spring or winter term.

=== Symbols and logos ===
- The school's seal is an oil lamp with the inscription "Mind the light," referring to the Quaker conception of God's presence within all people as the inner light.
- The logo consists of the two words of the name ("The George School" is incorrect) separated by a stylized tree, reminiscent of the large one on the south end of campus. The Katsura tree, which inspired the logo, was removed and replaced in 2014 due to its "frail and dangerous condition." The current logo, adopted in 2000, replaced a more stylized, "bare branch" logo adopted in the late 1970s.
- The school colors were historically buff and brown, but those proved harder and harder to find for sports uniforms. Since autumn 2000, the school colors have been green and white.
- The mascot is a cougar, portrayed by one of the cheerleaders.

== Campus ==
Although its mailing address is Newtown, Pennsylvania, only a tiny part of its campus is in Newtown Township. Most of the campus is in Middletown Township. Both towns are in Bucks County.

Its property is now divided by the Route 332/Route 413 Newtown bypass, and the main entrance is on Route 413 south of the bypass.

The campus is adjacent to Neshaminy Creek, and Newtown Creek cuts through the property. Both are in the less-developed western part of the campus.

The Pennswood retirement community and Newtown Friends School, also Quaker institutions, are on George School land and adjacent to the campus.

=== George School Station ===
When it was founded, George School was relatively isolated. It had its own train station on the Reading Railroad's Newtown line, later the Fox Chase Line, and its own post office branch. SEPTA suspended commuter train service on January 14, 1983.

=== Meetinghouse ===
The campus meetinghouse was originally the 12th Street Meeting House at 10 South 12th Street, Philadelphia. Built 1812–1814, it incorporated materials from the Greater Meeting House at 2nd and Market Streets, dating back to 1755. The building became redundant when the 12th Street Meeting merged with the Race Street Meeting in 1956 to form Central Philadelphia Monthly Meeting. The land was sold, but the building was saved from demolition by being dismantled and relocated to George School, 1972–1974.

== Notable alumni ==
- Donzaleigh Abernathy (class of 1975) – actress; daughter of civil-rights leader Reverend Ralph Abernathy
- David Belt (class of 1985) – international real estate developer and entrepreneur
- Norman Berson – attorney; elected as a Democrat to the Pennsylvania House of Representatives in 1966 and served seven consecutive terms
- Edward G. Biester, Jr. – U.S. congressman
- David Binder (class of 1949) – New York Times journalist
- Julian Bond (class of 1957) – civil-rights leader; chairman, NAACP
- Lael Brainard (class of 1979) – Vice Chair of the Board of Governors of the Federal Reserve
- Mario Capecchi (class of 1956) – receipient, 2007 Nobel Prize in Medicine
- Kathleen Neal Cleaver (class of 1963) – Black Panthers leader, civil rights activist and wife of Eldridge Cleaver
- John M. Crowther – actor, writer, artist
- Blythe Danner (class of 1960) – Tony Award– and Emmy Award–winning actress; mother of actress Gwyneth Paltrow
- Keir Dullea (class of 1954) – actor; star of 2001: A Space Odyssey
- Emily Falk (class of 1999) – psychologist; neuroscientist; professor of communication, University of Pennsylvania
- Ralph E. Gomory (class of 1946) – applied mathematician; executive
- James Hammerstein – Broadway director and producer
- George Michener Hart (class of 1937) – railroad historian; entrepreneur
- Jessica Helfand (class of 1978) – designer; writer; educator at Yale University
- Heather Henson (class of 1989) – puppet artist; daughter of Jim Henson
- Gwendolyn Holbrow (class of 1975) – artist
- Darlington Hoopes – politician; Socialist Party of America candidate for U.S. president in 1952 and 1956
- Stephen Lang – actor; Saturn Award winner for Avatar
- Liz Larsen (class of 1976) – actor
- Rachael Lippincott (class of 2013) – New York Times–bestselling novelist
- Sara Lomax-Reese – journalist and media executive
- J. Howard Marshall – businessman; husband of Anna Nicole Smith
- Peggy McIntosh (class of 1952) – activist, scholar, and author of the essay "White Privilege: Unpacking the Invisible Knapsack"
- Robert Mills (class of 1944) – physicist
- Meredith Monk – dancer, composer, and choreographer
- Roy Mottahedeh (class of 1957) – scholar of Iran and the Middle East; historian; educator at Harvard University; 1982 recipient of a MacArthur Fellowship
- Dick Packer – national team soccer player and collegiate player of the year
- Christine Salmon (class of 1937) – architect and educator; inducted into the Oklahoma Women's Hall of Fame in its inaugural year, 1982
- Andrew Scheinman (class of 1966) – filmmaker; co-founder, Castle Rock Entertainment
- George Segal (class of 1951) – Academy Award–nominated film actor; star of television's Just Shoot Me! and The Goldbergs
- Sonia Chalif Simon – art historian
- Stephen Sondheim (class of 1946) – Pulitzer Prize–winning composer and lyricist
- Meredith Stern (class of 1994) – artist and printmaker
- Henry S. Taylor (class of 1960) – Pulitzer Prize–winning poet
- John Templeton, Jr. (class of 1958) – philanthropist; president, John Templeton Foundation
- Mark K. Updegrove (class of 1980) – writer; director of the Lyndon Baines Johnson Library and Museum
- Charles Walton (class of 1939) – inventor; holder of first patent for RFID technology
- Alex Westerman (class of 1987) – senior creative director of OpusLA
- Mark Whitaker (class of 1975) – CNN reporter
- Kenneth Geddes Wilson (class of 1952) –receipient, 1982 Nobel Prize in Physics
- Sheena Wright (class of 1986) – deputy mayor, New York City; former chief executive officer, United Way of New York City
- Tanya Wright (class of 1989) – actress; creator of screenplays, television shows, and plays

== Notable staff ==
- Leon Bass, educator
- James Michener (1907–1997), novelist

== See also ==
- List of Friends schools

== Bibliography ==
- Hallowell, Howard Thomas Sr. (1951). How a Farm Boy Built a Successful Corporation: An Autobiography. Jenkintown, Pennsylvania, USA: Standard Pressed Steel Company. LCCN 52001275..
