= Newtown Friends School =

Coordinates: 40.20062°N 74.93057°W

Newtown Friends School is a coeducational prekindergarten through eighth grade Quaker independent school founded in 1948 and located in Bucks County, Pennsylvania. Though its name and address indicate it is in Newtown Township, it is physically located in Middletown Township. Newtown Friends' campus adjoins with that of George School.

Newtown Friends has one or two sections of sixteen to eighteen students at every grade level. Enrollment for the 2019–20 school year is 250 students. The curriculum at Newtown Friends includes a full range of subject areas including language arts, math, social studies, Latin (grades 5 through 8) or Spanish (grades PreK through 8), science, library, music and drama, art, computer and physical education. Learning at Newtown Friends takes place through a combination of hands-on experiences, group and individual projects, interdisciplinary approaches, as well as through the more traditional methods. Newtown Friends has a very active intergenerational program with Pennswood, a neighboring Quaker continuing life-care facility. The community service program is built into the curriculum and provides opportunities for all sixth through eighth graders to go out into the community on a regular basis. Community service in the earlier grades occurs through specific projects undertaken within the school which benefit outside agencies.

Newtown Friends is a candidate school for the International Baccalaureate Middle Years Program.

In fall 2000, Newtown Friends opened a new library media center and five new Lower School classrooms. In summer 2006, NFS did major renovations in its Upper School wing resulting in a new science laboratory and classroom, as well as improved spaces for five other classrooms.

Newtown Friends School is accredited by the Pennsylvania Association of Independent Schools (PAIS).
