= Walter P. Lomax Jr. =

American physician and entrepreneur (1932–2013)

- Born: July 31, 1932; South Philadelphia, US
- Died: October 10, 2013 (aged 79–80); University City, Philadelphia, US
- Education: Hahnemann University Hospital; La Salle University
- Occupations: Physician, health administrator, entrepreneur, philanthropist
- Spouse: Beverly Lomax

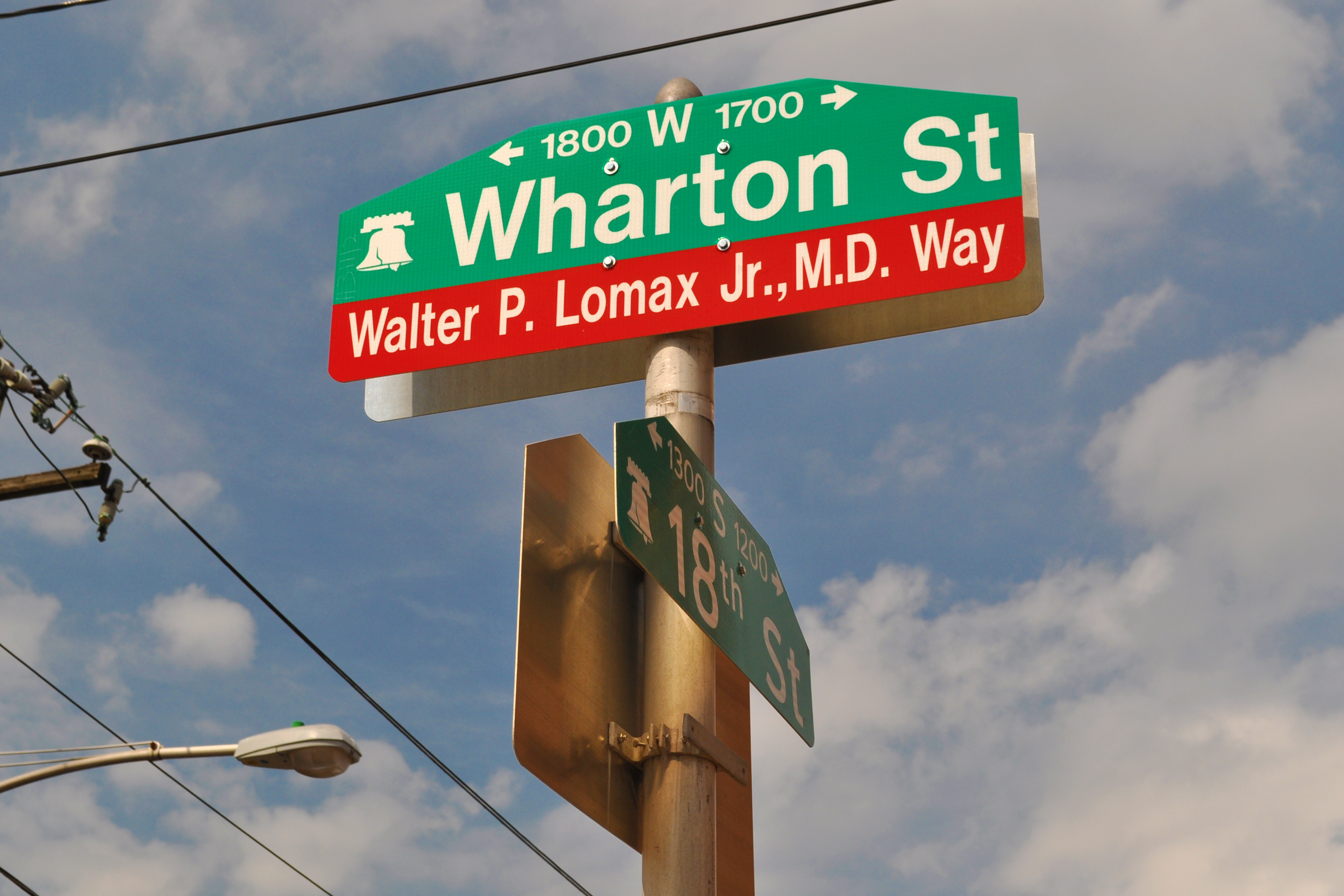
Walter P. Lomax, Jr., M.D., Way - Dedicated 1800 block of Wharton St., Philadelphia PA

Walter P. Lomax Jr. (July 31, 1932 – October 10, 2013) was an American physician, health administrator, and philanthropist from Philadelphia. Between the 1960s and 2000s, Lomax established a network of neighborhood clinics and correctional healthcare services and acquired WURD, then the only Black-owned and operated radio station in Pennsylvania.

== Life and career ==
Lomax graduated from La Salle University and Hahnemann University Hospital and launched his medical practice out of his rowhouse in South Philadelphia in 1958. One of his patients was Martin Luther King Jr., whom Lomax treated for an upper respiratory infection in 1968. His practice grew from a private single physician office to six clinics with 22 physicians.

In 1982, Lomax established Lomax Health Systems to manage his clinics, and a year later he founded Correctional Healthcare Solutions, which recruited healthcare workers to supplement the City of Philadelphia's staff in the prison system. The business grew quickly and by the 1990s was managing healthcare workers at seventy prisons in ten states. Lomax expanded into real estate and philanthropy, founding Lomax Companies as an umbrella corporation and launching the Lomax Family Foundation. In 2003, Lomax and his wife purchased radio station WURD, then the only Black-owned and operated radio station in Pennsylvania.

In 1994, Lomax purchased the Jubilee Farm Plantation, where his great-grandmother had been enslaved, in King William County, Virginia. The eighteenth-century property consisted of 800 acres.

In 2004, Lincoln University (Pennsylvania) awarded Lomax an honorary Ph.D. in science for his various contributions to healthcare. Lomax is a former trustee of La Salle University and the Philadelphia Orchestra.

In August 2021, the 1800 block of Wharton Street in Philadelphia was renamed "Walter P. Lomax, Jr., M.D., Way" to commemorate where he started his medical practice, at the South Philadelphia Medical Center on the corner of 18th and Wharton Streets.

Lomax died of a stroke at the Hospital of the University of Pennsylvania at the age of 81.
