= WURD =

Coordinates: 39°55′2.4″N 75°13′16.7″W

- Philadelphia, Pennsylvania; United States
- Broadcast area: Philadelphia metropolitan area
- Frequency: 900 kHz

Programming
- Format: Urban talk

Ownership
- Owner: LEVAS Communications, LP

History
- First air date: July 23, 1958
- Former call signs: WFLN (1958–1985); WDVT (1985–1988); WFLN (1988–1989); WURD (1989–1999); WEMG (1999–2001)
- Call sign meaning: "Word"

Technical information
- Licensing authority: FCC
- Facility ID: 52442
- Class: D
- Power: 1,060 watts day; 124 watts night
- Translator: 96.1 W241CH (Philadelphia)

Links
- Public license information: Public file; LMS
- Website: www.900amwurd.com

WURD (900 AM) is a commercial radio station in Philadelphia, Pennsylvania, broadcasting an urban talk radio format. It is owned by the LEVAS Communications with studios and offices on North Delaware Avenue in Philadelphia near the Penn Treaty Park. Local hosts are heard most of the day but WURD also carries nationally syndicated programs from Reverend Al Sharpton and Tavis Smiley.

By day, WURD is powered at 1,060 watts using a directional antenna. AM 900 is a clear channel frequency; at night, to avoid interference to other stations, WURD reduces power to 124 watts. The transmitter is off Essington Avenue, near the Schuylkill River. Programming is also simulcast on FM translator W241CH at 96.1 MHz.

== History ==
=== Classical music ===
The station signed on the air on July 23, 1958. The original call sign was WFLN. In an era when few radios could receive FM broadcasts, 900 AM served as a simulcast for classical music station WFLN-FM 95.7 (now WBEN-FM).

The stations were owned by the Franklin Broadcasting Company with studios on Ridge Avenue in Philadelphia. The two stations were affiliates of the NBC Radio Network.

=== Talk radio ===
In the early 1980s, the station was sold to veteran Philadelphia broadcaster Frank Ford, ending the classical simulcast. Ford changed the format to talk and the call sign to WDVT (Delaware Valley Talk). Weekday talk show hosts on WDVT included Peter Tilden, Philadelphia Magazine writer Carol Saline, former Philadelphia Bulletin columnist D.I. Strunk and Ford himself. Weekend specialty shows on the station covered subjects ranging from pro wrestling to gay issues.

WDVT made little impact in the Arbitron ratings and had trouble generating a profit. After a few years, Ford took the station off the air and returned its license to the owners of WFLN-FM. That company then sold it to Willis Broadcasting, a Virginia-based Christian radio broadcaster, which changed the call letters to WURD. The call sign represented "The Word", a reference to the words in The Bible.

=== Spanish hits and black talk ===
In July 1996, Spanish language broadcaster Alfredo Alonso bought the station for $1.5 million and began playing Latin contemporary hits as WEMG, "Mega 900". The station became the first property purchased by Alonso, who founded Mega Broadcasting that same year. Eventually, Mega moved the WEMG call sign to 1310 kHz, and sold 900 AM for $8.5 million in 2001.

The new owner, Walter P. Lomax Jr., reinstituted the WURD call sign. After a period of apparent indecision, during which the station aired various types of music and CNN Headline News, management settled on a talk format aimed at Philadelphia's African-American community.

=== Presidential interview controversy ===
WURD host Andrea Lawful-Sanders resigned from the station after acknowledging that her post-debate interview with President Joe Biden included questions pre-selected by Biden's campaign team, which the station informed CNN on July 7, 2024.

Sara Lomax, president and CEO of WURD, said, "The interview featured pre-determined questions provided by the White House, which violates our practice of remaining an independent media outlet accountable to our listeners".
