= Flyers Cup =

The Flyers Cup is an annual high school ice hockey tournament held by the Philadelphia Flyers. The first Flyers Cup was organized by the Flyers' Hockey Central organization in 1980, sponsored by the Pepsi Cola Bottlers of the Delaware Valley. It was held at the University of Pennsylvania's Class of '23 Rink until relocating to the Haverford Skatium in 1984.

The Flyers Cup was the idea of Ed Golden, then Public Relations Director for The Spectrum, who suggested the concept of a regional high school hockey championship in the fall of 1979 to Aaron Siegel and Andy Abramson, who is considered the father of the Flyers Cup. The Flyers Cup logo was designed by Sal Panasci, husband of the Flyers Marketing Director at the time, Linda Panasci, and donated by his design firm.

The founding organizers of the Flyers Cup included Aaron Siegel, President of The Spectrum, Andy Abramson, Executive Director/Flyers Hockey Central, Kenneth R. Gesner, Atlantic District President and USA Hockey Director, Jack Hunt, President, InterCounty Scholastic Hockey League, Andy Richards, President, Suburban High School Hockey League, Paul Saylor, Commissioner, Lower Bucks County Scholastic Hockey League and Jim Cunningham, President, Lower Bucks County Scholastic Hockey League. Archbishop Carroll's Scott Chamness was named the first recipient of the Bobby Clarke Award as the 1980s Flyers Cup's Most Valuable Player.

The invitational tournament is the scholastic hockey championship for eastern Pennsylvania high schools and is conducted through three tiers of play, AAA, AA, and A with AAA representing private schools, AA large public schools and A small public schools based on male student enrollment. There are 53 participating teams consisting of 13 AAA, 20 AA, and 20 A chosen from teams participating in the following leagues: the Eastern High School Hockey League, the Inter-County Scholastic Hockey League, the Lehigh Valley Scholastic Hockey League, the Lower Bucks County Scholastic Hockey League, the South Jersey High School Ice Hockey League, the Suburban High School Hockey League, and the Central Pennsylvania Ice Hockey League. Teams are invited to participate based on their skill level as demonstrated by the strength of their overall schedule and season performance. The winner of the Flyers Cup at each tier level plays the respective western champion as determined by the Penguins Cup, held by the Pittsburgh Penguins, for the Pennsylvania State High School Ice Hockey Championship.

The Pennsylvania Cup came about through the collaboration of USA Hockey Director for Mid-America, Frank Black and the Flyers/Hockey Central's Andy Abramson, with support from Flyers President Bob Butera and then Penguins CEO Paul Martha. The first Pennsylvania Cup was held in 1981 in Philadelphia at the University of Pennsylvania's Class of '23 Ice Rink and hosted by The Philadelphia Flyers. The game featured the winner of the Flyers Cup vs. the winner of the Penguins Cup, a tournament that was inaugurated in 1981.

== Champions ==
AAA Level Flyers Cup Champions:

- 1980: Archbishop Carroll
- 1981: Archbishop Carroll
- 1982: Germantown Academy
- 1983: Germantown Academy
- 1984: Archbishop Ryan
- 1985: Cherry Hill East
- 1986: Conestoga
- 1987: Malvern Prep
- 1988: Council Rock
- 1989: William Tennent High School
- 1990: Malvern Prep
- 1991: Council Rock
- 1992: Monsignor Bonner
- 1993: Monsignor Bonner
- 1994: Germantown Academy
- 1995: Germantown Academy
- 1996: La Salle College High School
- 1997: Malvern Prep
- 1998: La Salle College High School
- 1999: Conwell–Egan
- 2000: Father Judge
- 2001: Malvern Prep
- 2002: Malvern Prep
- 2003: Malvern Prep
- 2004: Malvern Prep
- 2005: Malvern Prep
- 2006: Cardinal O'Hara High School
- 2007: Holy Ghost Prep
- 2008: La Salle College High School
- 2009: La Salle College High School
- 2010: Cardinal O'Hara High School
- 2011: La Salle College High School
- 2012: La Salle College High School
- 2013: La Salle College High School
- 2014: La Salle College High School
- 2015: Holy Ghost Prep
- 2016: La Salle College High School
- 2017: Holy Ghost Prep
- 2018: Saint Joseph's Preparatory School
- 2019: La Salle College High School
- 2021: Malvern Prep
- 2022: Malvern Prep
- 2023: La Salle College High School
- 2024: La Salle College High School
- 2025: Holy Ghost Prep
- 2026: Holy Ghost Prep

AA Level Flyers Cup Champions:

- 1980:
- 1981:
- 1982:
- 1983:
- 1984:
- 1985:
- 1986:
- 1987:
- 1988:
- 1989:
- 1990: LBCSHL - Father Judge High School Crusaders
- 1991: SHSHL - Germantown Academy Patriots
- 1992: SHSHL - Council Rock High School North Indians
- 1993: LBCSHL - Father Judge High School Crusaders
- 1994: LBCSHL - Conwell Egan High School Eagles
- 1995: LBCSHL - Conwell Egan High School Eagles
- 1996: EHSHL - Upper Darby High School Royals
- 1997: ICSHL - Conestoga High School Pioneers
- 1998: ICSHL - Unionville High School Indians
- 1999: ICSHL - LaSalle College High School Explorers
- 2000: ICSHL - Archbishop John Carroll High School Patriots
- 2001: ICSHL - Archbishop John Carroll High School Patriots
- 2002: ICSHL - Archbishop John Carroll High School Patriots
- 2003: LBCSHL - Holy Ghost Prep Firebirds
- 2004: ICSHL - Archbishop John Carroll High School Patriots
- 2005: EHSHL - Haverford High School Fords
- 2006: EHSHL - Haverford High School Fords
- 2007: EHSHL - Haverford High School Fords
- 2008: ICSHL - Conestoga High School Pioneers
- 2009: SHSHL - Council Rock High School South Golden Hawks
- 2010: ICSHL - Downingtown East High School Cougars
- 2011: SHSHL - Council Rock High School South Golden Hawks
- 2012: SHSHL - Council Rock High School South Golden Hawks
- 2013: SHSHL - Cherokee Chiefs
- 2014: SHSHL - Central Bucks South High School Titans
- 2015: ICSHL - Downingtown East High School Cougars
- 2016: SHSHL - Central Bucks South High School Titans
- 2017: ICSHL - Downingtown East High School Cougars
- 2018: ICSHL - Downingtown East High School Cougars
- 2019: ICSHL - Downingtown East High School Cougars
- 2020: CANCELLED - (COVID19 PANDEMIC)
- 2021: ICSHL- Haverford High School Fords
- 2022: SHSHL - Pennridge High School Rams
- 2023: LBCSHL - Pennsbury High School Falcons
- 2024: SHSHL - Pennridge High School Rams
- 2025: SHSHL - North Penn High School Knights
- 2026: SHSHL - North Penn High School Knights

A Level Flyers Cup Champions:

- 1980:
- 1981:
- 1982:
- 1983:
- 1984:
- 1985:
- 1986:
- 1987:
- 1988:
- 1989:
- 1990:
- 1991: EHSHL - Monsignor Bonner High School Friars
- 1992: EHSHL - Haverford High School Fords
- 1993: LBCSHL - Pennsbury High School Falcons
- 1994: SJHSHL - Washington Twp High School
- 1995: ICSHL - Unionville High School Indians
- 1996: ICSHL - St Pius X High School
- 1997: EHSHL - Marple-Newtown High School Tigers
- 1998: ICSHL - Garnet Valley High School Pioneers
- 1999: LBCSHL - Archbishop Ryan High School Raiders
- 2000: LBCSHL - Pennsbury High School Falcons
- 2001: EHSHL - Springfield High School Cougars
- 2002: ICSHL - Radnor High School
- 2003: ICSHL - Radnor High School
- 2004: ICSHL - Radnor High School
- 2005: ICSHL - Penncrest High School Lions
- 2006: ICSHL - Penncrest High School Lions
- 2007: ICSHL - West Chester Henderson High School Warriors
- 2008: ICSHL - West Chester East High School Vikings
- 2009: ICSHL - Bayard Rustin High School Golden Knights
- 2010: ICSHL - Bayard Rustin High School Golden Knights
- 2011: ICSHL - Springfield Cougars
- 2012: ICSHL - Bayard Rustin High School Golden Knights
- 2013: ICSHL- West Chester East High School Vikings
- 2014: ICSHL - Bayard Rustin High School Golden Knights
- 2015: ICSHL - Bayard Rustin High School Golden Knights
- 2016: ICSHL - Bayard Rustin High School Golden Knights
- 2017: ICSHL - Bayard Rustin High School Golden Knights
- 2018: ICSHL - Bayard Rustin High School Golden Knights
- 2019: ICSHL - Bayard Rustin High School Golden Knights
- 2020: CANCELLED - (COVID19 PANDEMIC)
- 2021: ICSHL- West Chester East High School Vikings
- 2022: ICSHL- West Chester East High School Vikings
- 2023: ICSHL- West Chester East High School Vikings
- 2024: CPIHL - Hershey High School Trojans
- 2025: ICSHL - Garnet Valley High School Jaguars
- 2026: CPIHL - Hershey High School Trojans

== See also ==
- Pennsylvania high school hockey
