= High school ice hockey in Pennsylvania =

Teams from 150 high schools competed as varsity ice hockey teams in Western and Eastern Pennsylvania. Unlike many other high school sport in Pennsylvania, hockey is not run under Pennsylvania Interscholastic Athletic Association umbrella. However, Pennsylvania's high school ice hockey is sanctioned by USA Hockey and varsity-level programs are marginally overseen by the NHL Pittsburgh Penguins and Philadelphia Flyers organizations through the Penguins Cup and the Flyers Cup. However, it is still considered a school sport and it is still just as much a part of the High School as any other sport, and is affiliated with the school. Some high schools with lower hockey participation may combine with other schools to have sufficient rosters. Most schools with a varsity ice hockey team also field a junior varsity team as well

== Format ==
Varsity teams are divided into four divisions, AAA, AA, A, and B (Open). Western divisional champions earn a bid to the Penguins Cup playoff tournament. Eastern divisional teams earn a bid by invitation to the Flyers Cup playoff tournament. All varsity teams are eligible except non-pure and second varsity teams.

== State Championship ==
The Pennsylvania State High School Ice Hockey Championship is awarded through a state tournament. The tournament pits the champions from the Penguins Cup and Flyers Cup with the winners receiving the AAA, AA, or A Pennsylvania Cup. The location changes every year rotating between Western and Eastern cities. Attempts to mirror the PIAA state championships by hosting the games in Hershey, Pennsylvania, lasted a single season, with only the 2005 series being held at the historic Hersheypark Arena. The first Pennsylvania Cup was held at the University of Pennsylvania's Class of 1923 Ice Rink under the auspices of The Philadelphia Flyers "Hockey Central" organization. USA Hockey's Mid America Director Frank Black and The Flyers' Andy Abramson organized the championship, after Flyers President Robert "Bob" J. Butera and Penguins EVP Paul Martha agreed to sponsor the event annually. Now the game alternates venues from East to West. in State College, PA.

== Alumni ==
Notable professional players that have participated in Pennsylvania high school hockey include Chad Kolarik, Colby Cohen, Brian O'Neill, Ray Dilauro, Mike Richter, Ryan Malone, R.J. Umberger, Mike Weber, Nick Foligno, Eric Tangradi, Nate Guenin, Brandon Saad, Dylan Reese, Shane Ferguson, Matt Bartkowski, John Zeiler, Christian Hanson, William Thomas, Grant Lewis, Tony Voce, Ray Staszak, Matt Clackson, Rob Madore, Ryan Mulhern, John Gibson and Ryan Gunderson. The state has also produced alumni that went on to play minor professional and elite collegiate levels.

== Historical timeline ==
- 1969 – Inter-County Scholastic Hockey League forms with six teams (Cardinal O'Hara High School, Conestoga High School, Haverford High School, Marple Newtown High School, Saint Joseph's Preparatory School, Swarthmore High School)
- 1970–1971 – Western Pennsylvania High School Hockey League forms in April at the Alpine Ice Chalet. Teams include Shaler, Churchill, Mt Lebanon, Penn Hills, Upper St Clair, and West Mifflin North
- 1971–1972 – Western Pennsylvania High School Hockey League completes first season of play at the Alpine Ice Chalet as Churchill, Mt Lebanon, Penn Hills, Shaler, Upper St Clair and West Mifflin North. Mt Lebanon defeats Penn Hills, 5–4 in overtime, to capture the first WPHSHL Championship.
- 1972–73 – Western Pennsylvania High School Hockey League expands to 19 schools as Richland, Chartiers Valley, Central Catholic, Bethel Park, Peabody, Fox Chapel, Lawrenceville Catholic, General Braddock, Armstrong, Gateway and Canevin participate. Churchill wins the WPHSHL crown over Richland in 4–3 in overtime.
- 1972–73 – Ohio Valley League forms out of the Sewickley Ice Arena and South Penn High School Hockey League forms out of the Rostraver Ice Garden
- 1974 – Baldwin High School has an undefeated regular season and wins the South Penn League title
- 1975 – WPHSHL becomes Western Pennsylvania Interscholastic Hockey League. Baldwin High School wins State of Pennsylvania Title
- 1975 – Lake Shore Hockey League forms
- 1975 – Lower Bucks County Scholastic Hockey League forms
- 1975 – Inaugural Pennsylvania High School Hockey Championships in Erie, Pa at the Glenwood Ice Arena
- 1980 – First Flyers Cup tournament Archbishop Carroll finds a way past Haverford's star goalie Christopher Cifone and defeats Haverford High School. The first Flyers Cup was organized by the Flyers' Hockey Central organization, sponsored by the Pepsi Cola Bottlers of the Delaware Valley. The founding organizers included Aaron Siegel, President of The Spectrum, Andy Abramson, Executive Director/Flyers Hockey Central, Kenneth R. Gesner, Atlantic District Director, Jack Hunt, President, InterCounty Scholastic Hockey League, Andy Richards, President, Suburban High School Hockey League, Paul Saylor, Commissioner, Lower Bucks County Scholastic Hockey League and Jim Cunningham, President, Lower Bucks County Scholastic Hockey League. Archbishop Carroll's Scott Chamness was named the first recipient of the Bobby Clarke Award as the Flyers Cup's Most Valuable Player.
- 1981 – First Pennsylvania Cup, State High School Ice Hockey Championship was held at the University of Pennsylvania's Class of 23 Rink. The Pennsylvania Cup was organized Frank J. Black, USA Hockey Director for Mid-America Region, Andy Abramson, executive director of the Philadelphia Flyers/Hockey Central and Atlantic District Registrar, Atlantic District Director Kenneth R. Gesner, with support by Robert J. Butera, President of the Philadelphia Flyer and Paul Martha, former executive vice president, general counsel and CEO with the Pittsburgh Penguins. The Flyers and Penguins organizations contributed financial and operational support, paying for ice time, game officials, publication of the game day program and support staff. The event was played under as a sanctioned USA Hockey (AHAUS) tournament.
- 1991 – Lehigh Valley Scholastic Hockey League forms
- 1994 – CPIHL forms
- 1996 – PA Hockey Scholastic Showcase begins play
- 1999 – WPIHL, LKSHL and SHIHL merge to form PIHL
- 2000 – Pennsylvania Interscholastic Hockey League forms
- 2004 – Eastern High School Hockey League forms
- 2005 – AAA League forms for Flyers Cup
- 2007 – Inter County Scholastic Hockey League splits into three divisions, ICSHL Central, ICSHL Chester County and ICSHL Independents, to copy the divisions PIAA uses to organize schools in other sports

== Divisions ==
While the western part of the state has been divided into fairly equal levels at the AAA, AA, and A levels, the eastern part has mostly been run by the independent leagues that compete for Flyers Cup. A change was made recently in an effort to provide more uniformity throughout the eastern portion of the state. Whereas the levels were previously determined by where a team finished in its respective leagues, the Flyers Cup recently restructured the system were AAA is all open enrollment schools, AA is the larger public schools, and A is the smaller public schools. The open enrollment schools are not forced to play AAA, but if they do not they cannot qualify for the Flyers Cup. Changes are still being proposed for the 2008–2009 season that could create a second varsity level for open enrollment schools that do not wish to play at the AAA level.

== Leagues ==
=== Eastern PA ===
- Berks Scholastic Ice Hockey League (BSIHL) operated through the end of 2007–2008 season – replaced by EPSHL in 2008–2009 season
- Central Pennsylvania interscholastic Hockey League (CPIHL)
- East Penn Scholastic Hockey League (EPSHL)
- Eastern High School Hockey League (EHSHL)
- Inter-County Scholastic Hockey League (ICSHL)
- Lehigh Valley Scholastic Hockey League (LVSHL)
- Northeast PA Scholastic Hockey League (NEPASHL)
- Suburban High School Hockey League (SHSHL)
- Lower Bucks County Scholastic Hockey League (LBCSHL)

(note: Phillipsburg High School from New Jersey also plays in LVSHL.)

=== Western PA ===
- Lake Shore Hockey League (LKSHL)
- Pennsylvania Interscholastic Hockey League (PIHL)

(note: teams from West Virginia also play in PIHL.)

== Programs ==
School	Nickname	Colors	Established	League	Class	District League Titles	State Championships
Abington High School	Galloping Ghosts	Maroon and White	1974	SHSHL	AA	1974, 1975, 1976, 1978, 2003, 2004	1976
Allentown Central Catholic High School	Vikings	Green and Gold		LVSHL			
Altoona Area High School	Mountain Lions	Maroon and White		LMHL	A		
Annville Cleona High School	Dutchman	Red, Black and White		CPIHL	AA		
Ambridge Area High School	Bridgers	Garnet and Grey	1993	PIHL	AA		
Archbishop Carroll High School	Patriots	Red and White		EHSHL	AAA		1981, 2004
Archbishop Ryan	Raiders	Red, Black and Gold	1974	LCSHL & LBCSHL	AAA		
Archbishop Wood	Vikings	Black, Green and Gold	1975	SHSHL	AAA	2013, 2017	
Armstrong Junior/Senior High School	Riverhawks	Royal, Orange, and White	2015	PIHL	AA	2018	
Avon Grove High School	Red Devils	Black, Red, and Gold	1999	ICSHL - Chester County	AA		
Back Mountain (Lake Lehman HS/Dallas HS)				NEPASHL			
Baldwin High School	Highlanders	Purple and White	1973	PIHL	AA		1974, 1975, 1988, 2021
Bayard Rustin High School	Golden Knights	Blue, Gold and White		ICSHL - Chester County	A		2009, 2014, 2015, 2016, 2017, 2018, 2019
Beaver Area High School	Bobcats	Maroon, Gray and White	1985	PIHL	B (Open)	1987, 1988, 1991, 1994, 1995, 2001, 2016	1991, 2001
Bensalem High School	Owls	Blue, Gray and White		LBCSHL	AAA		
Bethel Park High School	Blackhawks	Orange and Black	1972	PIHL	AAA		1997, 2000, 2001, 2002, 2005
Bethlehem Catholic High School	Golden Hawks	Brown and Gold	1991	LVSHL	AA		
Bishop Canevin High School	Crusaders	Navy Blue, Columbia Blue and White	1972	PIHL	A		1983, 1984, 1989, 2011
Bishop Guilfoyle High School	Marauders	Purple and Gold		LMHL	A		
Bishop McCort High School	Crimson Crushers	Crimson and Gold	1985	PIHL	A		1994, 1995, 1996, 1997, 1999
Bishop McDevitt High School	Lancers	Black and Gold		SHSHL	AA		
Bishop Shanahan High School	Eagles	Green and Black		ICSHL - Chester County	AAA		
Boyertown Area H.S.	Bears	Red and White		ICSHL - Independent	A		
Butler High School	Golden Toronado	Blue and Gold	1974	PIHL	AAA		
Canon-McMillan High School	Big Macs	Gold and Blue	1994	PIHL	AAA		
Cardinal O'Hara	Lions	Red and Blue	1969	EHSHL	AAA	2010	2010
Carrick High School	Cougars	Blue and Gold	1996	PIHL	Open		
Cathedral Prep	Ramblers	Orange and Black	1974	PIHL	AA	1984, 1997, 2015	1984, 1997, 2015
Cedar Cliff High School	Colts	Blue and Gold	1994	CPIHL	AA		
Central	Wolves	Red and White		PIHL	Open		
Central Bucks High School East	Patriots	Red, Blue and White		SHSHL	AA	2011	
Central Bucks High School South	Titans	Blue, Black and White		SHSHL	AA	2005, 2012, 2013, 2015, 2016. 2017, 2018	2014, 2016
Central Bucks High School West	Bucks	Black and Gold		SHSHL	AA	2005	
Central Catholic	Vikings	Gold and Blue	1972	PIHL	AAA		
Central Valley High School	Warriors	Blue and White	2010	PIHL	Open		
Central Dauphin High School	Rams	Green and White	1994	CPIHL Tier 1	AA		
Central York High School	Panthers	Orange and Black	1997	CPIHL Tier 1	AA	2011	
Chartiers Valley	Colts	Red and Blue	1972	PIHL	A	1986	1986
Chichester High School	Eagles	Maroon and Grey		ICSHL - Independent	A		
Conemaugh Valley High School	Blue Jays	Blue and White	1998	LMHL	A		
Conestoga High School	Pioneers	Garnet and Gray	1969	ICSHL - Central	AA	1985, 1986	1985, 1986
Connellsville Area High School	Falcons	Blue and White	1995	PIHL	(B) Open		
Conwell–Egan Catholic High School	Eagles	Blue and White	1974	LBCSHL	AAA	1999	1995, 1999
Council Rock High School North	Indians	Blue, White and Silver	1976	SHSHL	AA		
Council Rock High School South	Golden Hawks	Blue, Gold and White	2003	SHSHL	AA	2010, 2020	2012
Crestwood High School	Comets	Red, White, and Black		NEPASHL			
Cumberland Valley High School	Eagles	Black and Red		CPIHL Tier I	AA		
Downingtown High School East	Cougars	Blue and Yellow		ICSHL - Chester County	AA	2017, 2018	2017, 2018
Downingtown High School West	Whippets	Blue and Yellow		ICSHL - Chester County	AA		
Easton Area High School	Red Rovers	Red and White		LVSHL	AA		
Emmaus High School	Green Hornets	Green and Gold		LVSHL	AA	1991, 1992	
Fairview High School	Tigers	Red and White	1975	LKSHL		1977, 1981, 1982	1977, 1981, 1982
Father Judge	Crusaders	Blue and Red		LCSHL	AAA		1990, 1993
Ferndale Area Senior High School	Yellow Jackets	Gold and Black	1996	LMHL	A		
Forest Hills High	Rangers	Dark Green, Gold, and White	1991, 2018	LMHL	A		
Fort Leboeuf High School	Bisons			LKSHL			
Fox Chapel	Foxes	Red and Black	1972	PIHL	A		
Franklin Regional	Panthers	Navy and Gold	1981	PIHL	AA		
Freedom High School	Patriots	Black and Yellow		LVSHL		1994, 1995, 1996, 2000, 2005, 2007	
Freeport	Yellow Jackets	Blue and Gold	1973	PIHL	A		
Garnet Valley High School	Jaguars	Black and Maroon	1993	ICSHL - Central	A		
Gateway High School	Gators	Black, Vegas Gold, and White / Dark Grey	1972	PIHL	AA	1976, 1991, 1996 (AAA)	
Germantown Academy	Patriots	Blue and Red		Independence Hockey League (Western Pennsylvania)	AA		1983
Great Valley High School	Patriots	Blue and White		ICSHL - Chester County	A		
Greater Latrobe High School	Wildcats	Black and Orange	1981	PIHL	AA	2008, 2009, 2010	2008, 2009, 2010, 2013
Greensburg-Salem High School	Golden Lions	Brown and Gold		PIHL	A		
Hampton High School	Talbots	Gold and Blue	1973	PIHL	AA	1985,	
Harbor Creek High School	Huskies	Orange and Black		LKSHL			
Hatboro-Horsham High School	Hatters	Black, Red and White	1973	SHSHL	A	2018	
Haverford High School	Fords	Red and White	1969	ICHSL-CENTRAL	AA	2005, 2006, 2007	1992
The Haverford School	Fords	Maroon and Gold		IHL	Independent Prep League		
Hempfield Area High School	Spartans	Blue and Grey	1995	PIHL	AA		
Hempfield High School	Black Knights	Red, Black & White	1994	CPIHL Tier I	AA		
Hershey High School	Trojans	Orange and Blue	1994	CPIHL Tier I	A		2024
Holy Ghost Preparatory	Firebirds	Red and Blue		LCSHL & LBCSHL	AAA		2015
Holy Redeemer							
Indiana Area High School	Indians	Red and Black	1992	PIHL	A	2021	
Interboro High School	Buccaneers	Black and Gold		EHSHL	A		
Kennett High School	Blue Devils	Blue and White		ICSHL - Chester County	A		
Kiski Area HS	Cavaliers	Navy and Gold	1994	PIHL	A		
La Salle College High School	Explorers	Navy and Gold		ICSHL	AAA	1998, 2008, 2009, 2012, 2016, 2019	1998, 2008, 2009, 2012, 2016, 2019, 2023, 2024
Liberty High School	Hurricanes	Red and Blue		LVSHL			
Lower Dauphin High School	Falcons	Blue and White		CPIHL	AA		
Lower Merion High School	Bulldogs	White, Grey, Maroon and Black		ICSHL - Central	AA		
Malvern Preparatory	Friars	Blue and Gray		ICSHL - Chester County	AAA	1990, 2004	1990, 2004, 2021
Marple Newtown HS	Tigers	Orange and Black	1969, 2016	ICSHL	A		
Mars Area High School	Planets	Blue and Gold	1988	PIHL	AA	2011	2010, 2011
McDowell High School	Trojans	Blue and White	1972	PIHL	Open		
Meadville Area Senior High School	Bulldogs	Red and Black	1979	PIHL	A	1987, 1989, 1992, 1993, 1994, 1995, 1996, 2003	1987, 1989, 1992, 1993, 1994, 1995, 1996, 2003
Methacton High School	Warriors	Green and White		ICSHL - Independent	AA		
Monsignor Bonner	Friars	Green and White		ICSHL	AAA	1991	1991
Montour High School	Spartans	Black and Gold	1972	PIHL	AA		
Moon Area High School	Tigers	Black and Red	1972	PIHL	Open		
Mt. Lebanon School District	Blue Devils	Blue and Gold	1971	PIHL	AAA	1976, 2006	1976, 2006
Nazareth Area High School	Blue Eagles	Blue and White		LVSHL			
Neshaminy High School	Redskins	Red, Blue and White		SHSHL	AA		
Neshannock High School	Lancers	Red and White	2018	PIHL	B (Open)		
Neuman-Goretti High School	Saints	Black and Gold		ICSHL - Independent	A		
North Allegheny	Tigers	Black and Gold	1973	PIHL	AAA	2007, 2013	2007, 2013
North Catholic High School	Trojans	Scarlet and Gold	1972, 2016	PIHL	A	1977, 1981, 1986, 1992, 1993, 1995	
Northampton Area High School	Konkrete Kids	Orange, Black, and White	1990	LVSHL	A	1997, 2003, 2021, 2023, 2024	
North Hills Senior High School	Indians	Red and White	1973	PIHL	AA		
North Penn High School	Knights	Blue, Gray and White	2005	SHSHL	AA	2002, 2009, 2014	
Norwin High School	Knights	Blue and Gold	1974	PIHL	A		
Palmyra Area High School	Cougars	Orange and Black		CPIHL	AA		
Parkland High School	Trojans	Red and White	2000	LVSHL	AA	2004, 2006, 2008, 2010, 2011, 2012, 2013, 2014, 2015, 2016, 2017, 2018, 2019, 2020	
Wallenpaupack High School	Bucks	Purple, white and black		NEPASHL		1998, 2007	
Penncrest High School	Lions	Red and Gold		ICSHL - Central	A	2005	2005
Pennridge High School	Rams	Green, White, and Black		SHSHL	AA	2008, 2019	2022, 2024
Pennsbury High School	Falcons	Black and Orange	1975	SHSHL	AA	1986, 2021	1985
Penn-Trafford	Warriors	Green and Gold	1993	PIHL	AA		
Perkiomen Valley	Vikings	Orange, Black and White		ICSHL	AA		
Peters Township High School	Indians	Red and Black	1973	PIHL	AAA	2002, 2003, 2005, 2014, 2017	2002, 2003, 2005, 2014, 2017, 2022
Phillipsburg High School	Stateliners	Garnet and Gray		LVSHL		1998, 1999, 2001	
Pine-Richland High School	Rams	Green and Black	1972	PIHL	AA	2006, 2007, 2019	2006, 2007, 2019
Pittston	Patriots	Red, White, and Blue		NEPASHL			
Pleasant Valley High School	Bears	Blue and White		LVSHL	AA	2002	
Plum High School	Mustangs	Purple and Gold	1987	PIHL	AAA	1989, 2017	1989
Plymouth-Whitemarsh High School	Colonials	Red, White & Blue	1976	SHSHL	A	2009, 2020	
Pope John Paul II High School	Panthers	Blue, Gold & White	2010	SHSHL	A		
Quaker Valley High School	Quakers	Black and Gold	1998	PIHL	AA		2006, 2012
Quakertown High School	Panthers	Blue and White		SHSHL	A	2009	
Radnor High School		Maroon and White		ICSHL - Central	A	2002, 2003, 2004	2003, 2004
Richland Cambria Senior High School	Rams	Blue and Red	1991	LMHL	A	1999	
Ridley High School	Raiders	Green and Black		ICSHL - Central	AA		
Ringgold High School	Rams	Navy and Vegas Gold		PIHL	B	1990, 1992, 1993, 2010, 2019	
Roman Catholic	Cahillites	Purple and Gold		LCSHL & LBCSHL	AAA		
Saint Joseph's Preparatory	Hawks	Crimson and Grey	1969	EHSHL	AAA		2018
Scranton				NEPASHL			
Seneca Valley High School	Raiders	Black and Blue	1992	PIHL	AAA		
Serra Catholic High School	Eagles	Red and Gold	1987	PIHL	A	2000, 2001, 2002	2000, 2001, 2002
Sewickley Academy	Panthers	Red and Black	1973	MPHL (Midwest Prep Hockey League) / ISHL (Independent School Hockey League)	A		
Shady Side Academy	Indians	Navy and Gold	1973	MPHL (Midwest Prep Hockey League) / ISHL (Independent School Hockey League)	A		
Shaler Area High School	Titans	Red and Blue	1971	PIHL	AA	1985, 1989, 1990, 1994, 2009	
Somerset HS	Eagles	Orange and Black	1993	LMHL	A		
Souderton Area High School	Indians	Red and Black		SHSHL	AA		
South Fayette High School	Lions	Green and White	2001	PIHL	A		2023
South Park High School	Eagles	Blue and White	1973	PIHL	A	1994, 1995, 1996, 1997	
Southern Lehigh High School	Spartans	Blue and White	2009	LVSHL		2022	
Springfield HS	Cougars	Blue and Gold		ICSHL - Central	A		
Spring-Ford High School	Rams	Blue and Yellow		ICSHL	AA		
State College Area High School	Little Lions	Maroon and Gray	1975	LMHL	A	2006, 2019	
Strath Haven High School	Panthers	Black and White		ICSHL - Central	A		
Stroudsburg High School	River Rats	Blue and Green		LVSHL			
Susquehanna Valley High School				NEPASHL			
Sun Valley HS	Vanguards	Blue and Glod		ICSHL - Independent	A		
Thomas Jefferson High School	Jaguars	Black and Gold	1981	PIHL	A	1992, 1998, 1999, 2000, 2022	1998, 1999, 2000
Trinity	Hillers	Blue and White	1994	PIHL	B (Open)		
Twin Valley High School	Raiders	Green and Black	2007	ICSHL - Independent	A		
Unionville High School	Indians	Blue and Gold		ICSHL - Chester County	A		
Upper Darby High School	Royals	Purple and Gold		EHSHL	AA		
Upper Dublin High School	Cardinals	Black and Red		SHSHL	A	2007, 2008	
Upper Moreland High School	Bears	Purple and Gold	1976	SHSHL	A	2012, 2014	
Upper St. Clair High School	Panthers	Red and Black	1971	PIHL	AAA	1980, 1987, 1990, 2011	1980, 1987, 2011
Warwick High School	Warwick Warriors	Red& Black	1996	CPIHL Tier II	A		
West Allegheny HS	Indians	Red and Dark Grey	1992	PIHL	AA		
West Chester East High School	Vikings	Red, Gold and Black		ICSHL - Chester County	A	2008, 2013	1982, 2008, 2013, 2021, 2022, 2023
West Chester Henderson High School	Warriors	Maroon and Black		ICSHL - Chester County	A	2007	2007
Westmont Hilltop	Hilltoppers	Red and Grey	1980	PIHL	A	2003	
Whitehall High School	Zephyrs	Maroon and Yellow	1998	LVSHL			
William Tennent High School	Panthers	Red, Black and White	1975	SHSHL	AA	1977, 1979, 1992, 2006	1988
Wilmington High School	Greyhounds	Navy and Gold	2018	PIHL	B (Open)		
Wissahickon High School	Trojans	Blue and Gold		SHSHL	A	2003, 2006, 2010, 2015, 2019, 2021	
Wyoming Seminary	Knights	Blue and White	2015	NEPASHL			
Wyoming Area High School				NEPASHL			
Wyoming Valley West High School						NEPASHL	

== Folded programs ==
School	Nickname	Colors	Year Folded	Last League	Last Division	League Titles	State Championships
Churchill	Chargers	Red White & Black	1986	WPIHL		1973, 1974, 1975, 1976, 1978, 1979, 1980, 1982, 1983	1977 and 1979; Finalists: 1975 and 1976
JP McCaskey High School	Red Tornados	Red and Black	1998				
Jeannette	Jayhawks	Red and Blue	2001	PIHL			
Mercyhurst Prep (Erie)	Lakers	Dark Green, White, and Black	2001	LKSHL			
Hopewell	Vikings	Navy and Gold	2002	PIHL			
Seton-La Salle	Rebels	Green and Gold	2003	PIHL	A	1975, 1979, 1993, 1998, & 1999	1979 & 1998
Belle Vernon Area	Leopards	Dark Green, Black, and Vegas Gold	2004	PIHL			
Penn Hills	Indians	Red and Vegas Gold	2006	PIHL	B (Open)		
West Mifflin	Titans	Royal Blue, Gold, and White/Black	2007	PIHL			
Steel Valley	Ironmen	Maroon and Gold	2007	PIHL			
Woodland Hills	Wolverines	Turquoise and Black	2008	PIHL			
Valley (New Kensington)	Vikings	Black, Vegas, and White	2008	PIHL			
Center Area High School	Trojans	Royal and White	2009	PIHL	A		
Ligonier Valley	Rams	Red, Black, White	2011	PIHL			
South Allegheny	Gladiators	Navy and Gold	2012	PIHL	A (JV)		
Frazier	Commodores	Red and White	2013	PIHL			
Quigley Catholic	Spartans	Maroon and Gold	2013	PIHL	B (Open)		
Taylor Allderdice	Dragons	Dark Green and Black	2013	PIHL	B (Open)	1980, 1981, 1987, 1988, & 1989	
Keystone Oaks	Golden Eagles	Black and Vegas Gold	2014	PIHL	B (Open)		
Ford City Jr./Sr. High School (now Armstrong Junior/Senior High School)	Sabers	Purple and Gold	2015	PIHL	B (Open)		
Kittanning High School (now Armstrong Junior/Senior High School)	Wildcats	Red and Grey	2015	PIHL	A		
Greensburg Central Catholic	Centurions	Maroon, Silver, and White/Black	2018	PIHL	A	1992, 1993, 1994, & 1996	1993, 1994, 1996
Derry Area	Trojans	Royal, Gold, and White	2018	LMHL			
