= Center Ice Arena =

Ice rink in Delmont, Pennsylvania

Coordinates: 40.4013°N 79.5761°W

Center Ice Arena is an ice rink located in Delmont, Pennsylvania. The venue, opened in 1997, houses three NHL ice sheets and is home to eight high school teams, one college team, and one amateur team. During the summer season, the Allegheny Arena (added in 2003) is transformed into a roller rink.

Center Ice Arena has been home to many stars of Pennsylvania high school hockey, but perhaps the most notable is R. J. Umberger of Plum High School. Umberger has played for the Philadelphia Flyers and the Columbus Blue Jackets of the National Hockey League. In the rafters of Center Ice Arena's East Rink hangs his retired Plum Mustangs jersey.
