= Alpine Arena =

Building in Swissvale, Pennsylvania, US

Coordinates: 40.426913°N 79.875796°W

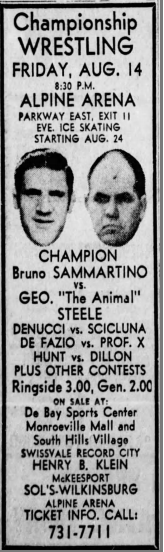
Advertisement for wrestling event at Alpine Arena, Pittsburgh, PA

Alpine Arena was an ice rink located in Swissvale, Pennsylvania, 9 miles (14 km) east of downtown Pittsburgh. Originally an outdoor skating rink, an indoor venue opened in 1967. It hosted ice hockey at the high school and collegiate levels, as well as rock concerts and other events. In 1975, the arena was transformed into tennis courts. As of 2008, the building is still standing.
