= Penguins Cup =

High school ice hockey tournament

The Penguins Cup is a high school ice hockey tournament of over 80 high school ice hockey teams from western Pennsylvania. The tournament is run by the Pennsylvania Interscholastic Hockey League with the finals administered by the National Hockey League's Pittsburgh Penguins franchise. Finals are held in three divisions: A, AA, AAA.

The tournament was held at the Civic/Mellon Arena until it closed in 2010. The tournament determines the regional champions from western Pennsylvania. The winners in each division play the eastern Pennsylvania Flyers Cup champions in the Pennsylvania State High School Ice Hockey Championship. Ice hockey is not administered by the Pennsylvania Interscholastic Athletic Association as are other high school sports.

== List of champions ==
The Penguins Cup champions have been very successful against the Flyers Cup winners in the state championship Pennsylvania Cup which began in 1981. Between 1993 and 2003, the Penguins Cup champions won 28 of 33 Pennsylvania Cups, including nine consecutive class A titles from 1993 to 2002, and eight consecutive in AA, 1996 to 2003. Penguins Cup champions went on to win all three Pennsylvania Cups in 1989, 1994, 1996, 1997, 2000, 2001, 2002, 2006, and 2011; and in both AA and AAA in 1984 and 1987 before the A division was added in 1989.

In AAA, Meadville Area Senior High School has won the most cups, with eight. The team also won one cup in AA. From 1992 to 1996, Meadville won five consecutive Penguins Cup and Pennsylvania state championships. In AA, Bishop Canevin High School has won six cups. In A, Bishop McCort High School of Johnstown has six Penguins Cups and five state championships, including four in a row from 1994 to 1997. Bethel Park High School has won 7 AAA Penguins Cups 1983 and 2012 including 5 AAA Pennsylvania State Titles in 1997, 2000, 2001, 2002 and 2005.

Churchill High School won 9 WPIHL [Western Pa] AAA League Championships in 11 years including 2 prior to the inaugural Penguins Cup [1975] in 1973 & 1974 and won it in 1975, 1976, 1978, 1979, 1980, 1982 and 1983 and four consecutive trips to the Pennsylvania State AAA Final in 1975, 1976, 1977 and 1979, winning in 1977 and 1979.

Some schools have won Penguins Cups and state championships in different divisions. Pine-Richland High School won back-to-back state championships in 2006 and 2007 in AA before moving to AAA, where they won the 2008 Penguins Cup but lost the state championship. Greensburg Central Catholic High School won Penguins Cups in 1993 in A, and in 1992, 1994 and 1996 in AA.

Prior to 1981, a tournament open to teams from across the state was held to determine a state champion. In 1981 the Western and Eastern system was adopted. The A division began in 1989. An asterisk (*) denotes that the team was also the state champion.

=== AAA ===
- 1975: Baldwin*
- 1976: Mt. Lebanon*
- 1977: Churchill Area* (defunct)
- 1978: Churchill Area* (defunct)
- 1979: Churchill Area* (defunct)
- 1980: Upper St. Clair*
- 1981: North Catholic High School
- 1982: Baldwin
- 1983: Bethel Park
- 1984: Cathedral Prep*
- 1985: Mt. Lebanon
- 1986: Upper St. Clair
- 1987: Upper St. Clair*
- 1988: Baldwin*
- 1989: Meadville Area*
- 1990: Upper St. Clair
- 1991: Armstrong Central High School (defunct)
- 1992: Meadville Area*
- 1993: Meadville Area*
- 1994: Meadville Area*
- 1995: Meadville Area*
- 1996: Meadville Area*
- 1997: Bethel Park*
- 1998: Pittsburgh Central Catholic
- 1999: Meadville Area
- 2000: Bethel Park*
- 2001: Bethel Park*
- 2002: Bethel Park*
- 2003: Meadville Area*
- 2004: Mt. Lebanon
- 2005: Bethel Park*
- 2006: Mt. Lebanon*
- 2007: North Allegheny*
- 2008: Pine-Richland
- 2009: Shaler Area
- 2010: Canon McMillan
- 2011: Upper St. Clair*
- 2012: Bethel Park
- 2013: North Allegheny*
- 2014: Peters Township*
- 2015: Canon-McMillan
- 2016: Cathedral Prep
- 2017: Peters Township
- 2018: Seneca Valley
- 2019: North Allegheny
- 2020: Canceled - COVID-19
- 2021: North Allegheny
- 2022: Peters Township

=== AA ===
- 1976: Abington*
- 1977: Erie Fairview*
- 1978:
- 1979: South Hills Catholic* (defunct)
- 1980: Williamsburg High School
- 1981: Erie Fairview*
- 1982: Erie Fairview*
- 1983: Bishop Canevin*
- 1984: Bishop Canevin*
- 1985: Bishop Canevin
- 1986: Chartiers Valley*
- 1987: Meadville*
- 1988: Taylor Allderdice
- 1989: Bishop Canevin*
- 1990: Father Judge H.S. (Philadelphia)
- 1991: Beaver Area*
- 1992: Greensburg Central Catholic
- 1993: Father Judge H.S. (Philadelphia)
- 1994: Greensburg Central Catholic*
- 1995: North Catholic
- 1996: Greensburg Central Catholic*
- 1997: Cathedral Prep*
- 1998: Thomas Jefferson*
- 1999: Thomas Jefferson*
- 2000: Thomas Jefferson*
- 2001: Beaver Area*
- 2002: Peters Township*
- 2003: Peters Township*
- 2004: Peters Township
- 2005: Peters Township
- 2006: Pine-Richland*
- 2007: Pine-Richland*
- 2008: Greater Latrobe*
- 2009: Greater Latrobe*
- 2010: Greater Latrobe*
- 2011: Bishop Canevin*
- 2012: West Allegheny
- 2013: Greater Latrobe*
- 2014: Bishop Canevin
- 2015: Cathedral Prep*
- 2018: Armstrong
- 2019: Pine-Richland*
- 2020: Canceled - COVID-19
- 2021: Baldwin*
- 2022: Thomas Jefferson

=== A ===
- 1989: Plum*
- 1990: Ringgold
- 1991: State College
- 1992: Greensburg Central Catholic
- 1993: Greensburg Central Catholic*
- 1994: Bishop McCort*
- 1995: Bishop McCort*
- 1996: Bishop McCort*
- 1997: Bishop McCort*
- 1998: Seton-La Salle*
- 1999: Bishop McCort*
- 2000: Serra Catholic*
- 2001: Serra Catholic*
- 2002: Serra Catholic*
- 2003: Westmont Hilltop
- 2004: Serra Catholic
- 2005: Bishop McCort
- 2006: Quaker Valley*
- 2007: Freeport Area
- 2008: Quaker Valley
- 2009: Mars Area
- 2010: Mars Area*
- 2011: Mars Area*
- 2012: Quaker Valley*
- 2013: Quaker Valley
- 2014: Quaker Valley
- 2015: Mars Area
- 2016: Franklin Regional
- 2017: Franklin Regional
- 2018: Bishop McCort
- 2019: Montour
- 2020: Canceled - COVID-19
- 2021: Indiana
- 2022: Norwin

== News articles ==
- 1981 Philadelphia Inquirer article
- 1997 Erie Times-News
- 1997 Erie Times-News
- 1999 Erie Times-News
- 1999 Philadelphia Inquirer
- 2003 Philadelphia Inquirer
- 2004 Pittsburgh Post-Gazette
- 2004 Pittsburgh Post-Gazette
- 2006 Pittsburgh Post-Gazette
- 2006 Pittsburgh Post-Gazette
- 2006 Pittsburgh Post-Gazette
- 2006 Pittsburgh Post-Gazette
- 2006 Pittsburgh Tribune-Review
- 2007 Pittsburgh Tribune-Review
- 2010 Pittsburgh Tribune-Review

== See also ==
- Pennsylvania high school hockey
