= WNPV =

- Lansdale, Pennsylvania; United States
- Broadcast area: Philadelphia metropolitan area
- Frequency: 1440 kHz
- Branding: WNPV Retro Radio

Programming
- Format: Classic hits
- Affiliations: Fox News Radio; ESPN Radio; Yahoo! Sports

Ownership
- Owner: Four Rivers Community Broadcasting Corporation

History
- First air date: October 17, 1960; 65 years ago
- Call sign meaning: North Penn Valley (regional descriptor)

Technical information
- Licensing authority: FCC
- Facility ID: 73347
- Class: D
- Power: 250 watts day 23 watts night
- Transmitter coordinates: 40°14′18.00″N 75°19′0.00″W
- Translators: 98.5 W253CA (Lansdale); 105.7 W289CZ (Lansdale)

Links
- Public license information: Public file; LMS

WNPV (1440 AM) is a radio station owned by Four Rivers Community Broadcasting Corporation. and licensed to Lansdale, Pennsylvania, United States. It serves Montgomery, Bucks and Philadelphia Counties, broadcasting a classic hits format. Founded in 1960, WNPV featured a blend of nationally syndicated and local talk shows, plus Fox News Radio updates and local news throughout the day. WNPV also aired Philadelphia Phillies baseball games, NASCAR and IRL races, as well as Penn State Football games and local high school football contests.

== Closure and Rebranding ==
In March 2020, general manager Phil Hunt announced that WNPV would cease broadcasting at the end of April. In a statement, he said, "In recent years, it has become increasingly difficult to compete for both audience and advertising dollars, and unfortunately it is no longer sustainable to continue to run the business in a way that delivers the service our community expects and deserves." The station sold off its studio and broadcast tower to the North Penn School District in July. Its license was donated to Four Rivers Community Broadcasting in October and the station resumed broadcasting on January 9, 2022 broadcasting an Oldies format.

== Local personalities ==
- Darryl Berger
- Rich Gunning
- Chuck Irwin
- Jeff Nolan
- Joe LeCompte

== Nationally syndicated personalities ==
- Jim Bohannon
- Michael Garko, PhD
- Clark Howard
- Dave Ramsey
