= High school ice hockey in West Virginia =

Ice hockey is a fairly new high school sport in the state of West Virginia. Eight high schools field teams, all but two (Vipers and Charleston) are located in the northern portion of the state, which compete in the Pennsylvania Interscholastic Hockey League.

Morgantown High School and University High School combine during the regular season to form one team and during state championship representing Morgantown High School, University High School, and all other schools in the Morgantown area.

In 2016 the Eastern Panhandle created a team to allow their section of the state to have representation in West Virginia hockey. In 2019 Charleston formed their High School co-op team called the Charleston Chiefs, paying homage to the original youth hockey program in Charleston.

== Competition format ==
The West Virginia Hockey League was formed in 2018 to organize and expand the hockey in the state of West Virginia. While most high school teams in WV participate in other leagues, the WVHL serves to bring those teams together a few times each year leading up to the annual State Championship. In Wheeling and Morgantown all five teams participate in Western Pennsylvania in the Pennsylvania Interscholastic Hockey League. Charleston participates in the Kentucky High School Hockey League.

Starting in 2005, a state championship began featuring all of the state's teams. In the first championship held in 2005, Wheeling Park defeating Wheeling Central Catholic 2–1.

== Historical timeline ==
1995 - Wheeling Park adds Ice Hockey
2002 - Linsly adds Ice Hockey
2005 - First West Virginia State Championship is held - in overtime Wheeling Park beats Wheeling Central 2–1.
2010 - Second overtime championship game. Wheeling Central beats Wheeling Park 2–1 on a Joey Baker goal. Joseph Baker went on to play D1 club hockey at West Virginia University.
2011 - Wheeling Central wins 11–3 over John Marshall. The win avenges Centrals only loss of the season to win their third state championship. Chas McFarland named playoff MVP.
2012 - Wheeling Central wins their third straight state championship (2010-2012) 3–2 over John Marshall. Harry Lee named playoff MVP.
2013 - Linsly defeats Wheeling Park 8–5 to win Bob Otten Cup .
2014 - Linsly defeats Wheeling Park 8–2 to win second straight Bob Otten Cup .
2015 - Linsly defeats Wheeling Park 5–3 to win third straight Bob Otten Cup. 2016 - Wheeling Central's Derek Death scores a hat trick to help Wheeling Central win their first Bob Otten cup in 3 years 2016 - Vipers Hockey WV add Ice Hockey
2017 - Wheeling Central wins second straight Bob Otten cup as they mount a comeback of 4 goals and Brian Courts nets the overtime winner making the score 8-7

2018 - Morgantown Mohawks defeats Martinsburg Vipers 9-6 for the MidAm West Virginia State Hockey Championship.

2018 - Wheeling Central defeats Wheeling Park 6–2 to win their third straight Bob Otten cup.

2019 - Morgantown Mohawks defeats Wheeling Central 5–4 in OT to win first ever Bob Otten Cup.

2020 - Morgantown Mohawks defeats Linsly 4–3 to win their second straight Bob Otten Cup and third state championship overall.

2021 - Morgantown Mohawks defeat Linsly 5–2 to win their third straight Bob Otten Cup and fourth state championship overall.

2022 - Wheeling Central defeats Wheeling Park 4-3 Grant Parshall was named tournament MVP.

2023- Morgantown Mohawks defeat Wheeling Park 4-1

2024- Wheeling Central defeats both Linsly and Park to advance to the state championship where the team defeated the Vipers 5-4 Zach Vitlip was named tournament MVP

== West Virginia teams ==
School	Location	Nickname	Colors	Established	League	State championships
The Linsly School	Wheeling	Cadets	Orange and Black	2002	ISHL	2013, 2014, 2015
Morgantown High School	Morgantown	Mohigans	Blue, Gold, White, and Red		PIHL	2018,2019, 2020, 2021
University High School	Morgantown	Hawks	Blue, Gold, White, and Red		PIHL	2018,2019, 2020, 2021
Wheeling Central Catholic High School	Wheeling	Maroon Knights	Maroon and White		PIHL	2007, 2010, 2011, 2012, 2016, 2017, 2018 ,2022
Wheeling Park High School	Wheeling	Patriots	Red and Blue	1995	PIHL	2005, 2006, 2008, 2009, 2025
John Marshall High School	Glen Dale	Monarchs	Brown and Gold		PIHL	
Charleston High School Hockey	Charleston	Chiefs	Red, Black, Yellow	2019	KHSHL	
Vipers Hockey WV	Martinsburg	Vipers	Yellow and Blue	2016	WVHL	
