= Justin Pugh =

American football player (born 1990)

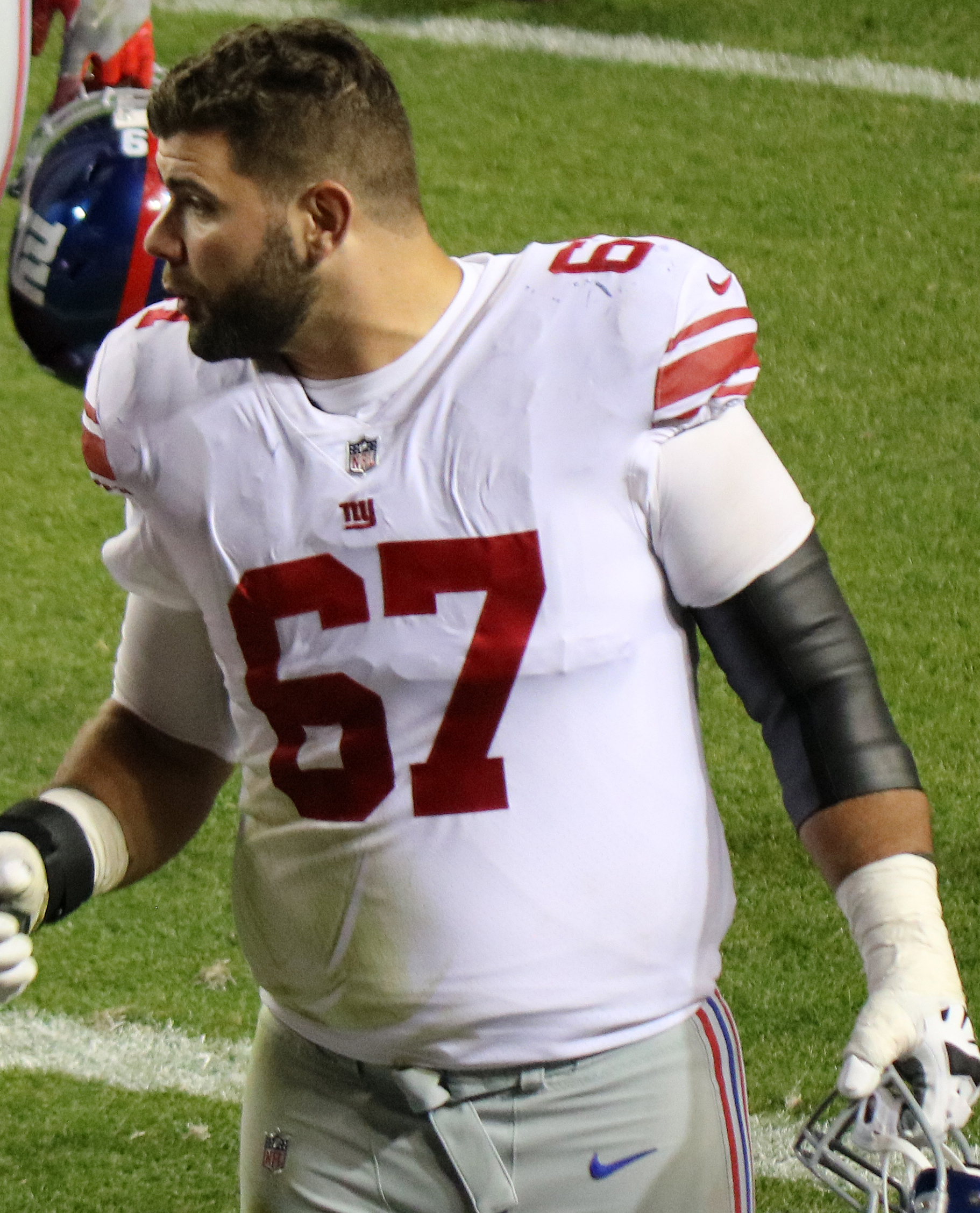
- Pugh with the New York Giants in 2017

Italian Football League
- Title: Commissioner

Personal information
- Born: August 15, 1990 (age 36); Holland, Pennsylvania, U.S.
- Listed height: 6 ft 5 in (1.96 m)
- Listed weight: 311 lb (141 kg)

Career information
- Position: Guard (No. 72, 67)
- High school: Council Rock South (Holland)
- College: Syracuse (2009–2012)
- NFL draft: 2013: 1st round, 19th overall pick

Career history

Playing
- New York Giants (2013–2017); Arizona Cardinals (2018–2022); New York Giants (2023)

Operations
- Italian Football League (2026–present)

Awards and highlights
- PFWA All-Rookie Team (2013); Second-team All-American (2012); 2× First-team All-Big East (2011, 2012); Second-team All-Big East (2010)

Career NFL statistics as of 2023
- Games played: 132
- Games started: 131
- Stats at Pro Football Reference

Justin David Pugh (born August 15, 1990) is an American former professional football player who was a guard in the National Football League (NFL) and current commissioner of the Italian Football League. He played college football for the Syracuse Orange. He was selected by the Giants in the first round of the 2013 NFL draft. He also played for the Arizona Cardinals.

== Early life ==
Pugh attended Council Rock High School South in Holland, Pennsylvania. He was named to the 2008 Pennsylvania Football News All-State Second-team for defense. He earned all-area and All-Suburban One League First-team honors as a junior and senior and named second-team all-area as a defensive lineman as a senior. He was named 2008 team MVP and defensive player of the year as a team captain. As a sophomore, he earned second-team all-area honors as an offensive tackle.

== College career ==
Pugh attended Syracuse University, where he played for the Syracuse Orange football team from 2009 to 2012. He started 34 games in his career, and earned All-Big East Conference honors in three consecutive seasons; second-team as a sophomore, and first-team as a junior and senior. Pugh entered the 2013 NFL draft with a year of college football eligibility remaining. Since he had already graduated, Pugh was cleared by the National Football League to compete in the 2013 Senior Bowl.

== Professional career ==
Pre-draft measurables
Height	Weight	Arm length	Hand span	Wingspan	40-yard dash	10-yard split	20-yard split	20-yard shuttle	Three-cone drill	Vertical jump	Broad jump	Bench press
6 ft 4 1/2 in (1.94 m)	307 lb (139 kg)	32 in (0.81 m)	10 1/4 in (0.26 m)	6 ft 7 1/8 in (2.01 m)	5.14 s	1.79 s	2.98 s	4.63 s	7.45 s	28.5 in (0.72 m)	8 ft 7 in (2.62 m)	22 reps
All values from NFL Combine/Pro Day

=== New York Giants (first stint) ===
==== 2013 ====
The New York Giants selected Pugh in the first round (19th overall) of the 2013 NFL Draft. He was the fifth offensive tackle and seventh offensive linemen selected in 2013. Pugh also became the highest player selected from Syracuse since Dwight Freeney in (first round, 11th overall) 2002 and the highest offensive linemen selected from Syracuse since Bob Fleck in 1954.

On July 25, 2013, the Giants signed Pugh to a four-year, $8.34 million contract that includes $7.96 million guaranteed and a signing bonus of $4.44 million.

Throughout training camp, Pugh competed with incumbent starter David Diehl for the starting right tackle position. Head coach Tom Coughlin named Pugh the starting right tackle to begin his rookie season.

He made his first career start and professional regular season debut in the Giants' season-opening 36–31 loss at the Dallas Cowboys. Pugh started the first half of the season poorly, but made significant improvement in the second half of the season. Out of 644 pass block snaps in 16 starts, Pugh allowed 43 hurries, gave up five sacks, and three hits. He was named to the PFWA All-Rookie Team.

==== 2014 ====
Pugh entered the 2014 season slated as the incumbent starting right tackle after the retirement of David Diehl. He started 14 games at right tackle and missed weeks 12–13 after suffering a quad injury that plagued him for a part of the season. This was his first season under new offensive coordinator Ben McAdoo after the departure of Kevin Gilbride.

==== 2015 ====
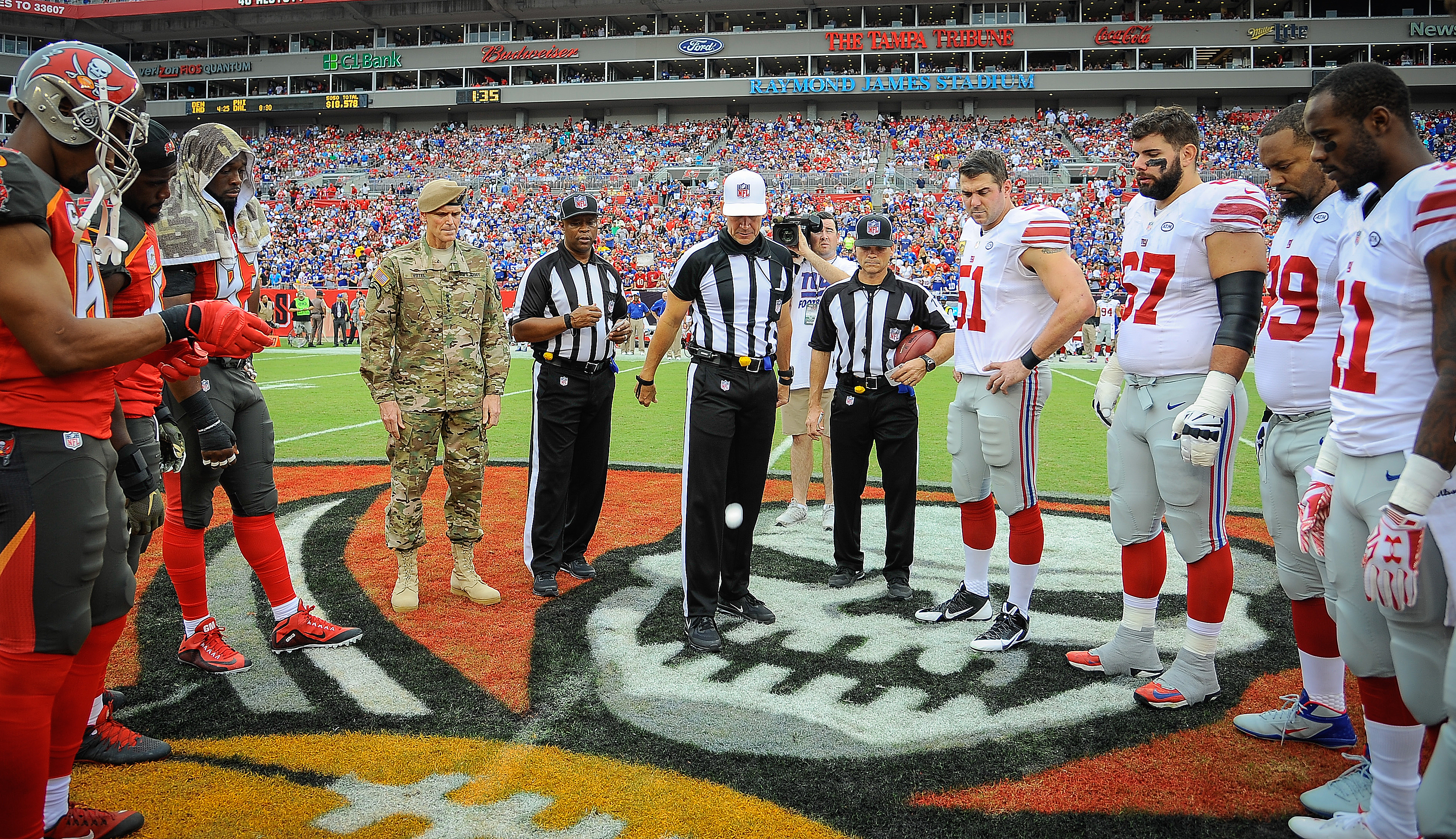
Pugh at the coin flip before the start of a game against the Tampa Bay Buccaneers in 2015.

Pugh entered training camp as the starting left guard after the New York Giants signed free agent Marshall Newhouse and named him the starting right tackle. The Giants originally drafted Pugh with the intention to have him play offensive guard, but decided to keep him at right tackle. They also stated that Pugh was better suited for guard under Ben McAdoo's offense. Pugh started 14 games throughout the season and missed two games (weeks 10/ and 12) due to a concussion. He received high grades, played well throughout the season, and was ranked fifth among all offensive guards in performance grades (+12.5) through the first eight games. By the end of the season he was ranked the ninth best offensive guard by Pro Football Focus with an overall grade of 86.7.

==== 2016 ====
On April 26, 2016, the New York Giants chose to pick up the fifth-year, $8.82 million option on Pugh's rookie contract.

After a stellar season in 2015, Pugh was slated as the starting left guard entering training camp and was officially named the starter at the beginning of the season. Through the first nine games, he was ranked as the top offensive left guard in the league by Pro Football Focus with an overall grade of 87.8. On November 9, 2016, he started at left guard during a 28–23 victory over the Philadelphia Eagles, but left after suffering an injury to his leg. It was later discovered to be a sprained MCL and he missed the next five games (weeks 10–14).

==== 2017 ====
In 2017, Pugh started the first eight games before going down with a back injury. He missed the next five games before being placed on injured reserve on December 14, 2017.

=== Arizona Cardinals ===
On March 17, 2018, Pugh signed a five-year, $45 million contract with the Arizona Cardinals. He started seven games at right guard before suffering a knee injury in week 10. He was placed on injured reserve on November 13, 2018.

In 2019, Pugh started all 16 games, 14 at left guard and two at right tackle.

In week 6 of the 2022 season, Pugh suffered a torn ACL and was placed on injured reserve on October 20, 2022, ending his season.

=== New York Giants (second stint) ===
On October 3, 2023, Pugh was signed to the Giants' practice squad. He started his first game of the season against the Buffalo Bills on October 15. On October 18, the Giants signed him to their active roster.

On July 25, 2025, Pugh announced he would be retiring as a member of the Giants.

== Executive career ==
On February 27, 2026, Pugh announced that he had assumed the role of Commissioner of the Italian Football League, stating a goal to grow the game of American football in Italy.

== Personal life ==
Pugh married Angela Viscount in April 2022.

In February 2015, Pugh appeared as a contestant on a celebrity edition of Who Wants to Be a Millionaire?, winning $10,000 for Shriners Hospitals for Children.
