= WRTI =

Public radio station in Philadelphia

- Philadelphia, Pennsylvania; United States
- Broadcast area: Philadelphia metropolitan area
- Frequency: 90.1 MHz (HD Radio)
- Branding: WRTI 90.1

Programming
- Format: Classical (days); Jazz (nights)
- Subchannels: HD2: Jazz - Classical
- Affiliations: NPR; PRX; APM

Ownership
- Owner: Temple University; (Board of Trustees)

History
- Founded: 1948
- First air date: July 9, 1953
- Call sign meaning: Radio Technical Institute

Technical information
- Licensing authority: FCC
- Facility ID: 65190
- Class: B
- ERP: 7,700 watts
- HAAT: 371 meters (1,217 ft)
- Transmitter coordinates: 40°2′30″N 75°14′10.1″W
- Translator: See § Translators
- Repeater: See § Simulcasts

Links
- Public license information: Public file; LMS
- Webcast: Listen live
- Website: www.wrti.org

WRTI (90.1 FM) is a non-commercial, listener-supported radio station in Philadelphia, Pennsylvania. It is a service of Temple University, with the university's board of trustees holding the station's license. The studios are on Cecil B. Moore Avenue in Philadelphia. WRTI plays classical music from 6 a.m. to 6 p.m. and jazz all night. It broadcasts using HD Radio technology, using its digital subchannel to reverse this schedule. On WRTI-HD2, jazz is heard by day, classical music at night. News updates are provided by National Public Radio. The station holds periodic fundraisers on the air and on line.

WRTI's transmitter is sited in the Roxborough section of Philadelphia; its tower is shared with several Philadelphia-area FM and TV stations. WRTI programming is also heard on a network of repeater stations in Pennsylvania, New Jersey and Delaware.

== History ==
WRTI began in 1948 as an AM carrier current station. It was founded by John Roberts, professor emeritus of communications at Temple University and a one-time anchorman at WFIL-TV (now WPVI-TV). He helped found the School of Communications and Theater at Temple. The call letters stand for "Radio Technical Institute" with the station helping students who planned careers in broadcasting.

In 1952, the station received an FM transmitter. It acquired a non-commercial license to cover the FM facility in 1953. WRTI-FM officially signed on the air on July 9, 1953. After years of serving as a student laboratory, WRTI-AM signed off for good in 1968.

WRTI-FM later switched from block programming to an all-jazz format in 1969. It remained an all-jazz station for nearly three decades.

In late 1997, Philadelphia's commercial classical music station, WFLN-FM, changed formats. Classical listeners in one of America's largest cities would be without a station playing classical music. At that point, WRTI decided to switch to a dual-format service. It would play classical music from 6 AM to 6 PM, and jazz from 6 PM to 6 AM, except Sunday mornings, when it broadcasts Christian gospel and spiritual music.

== Programming ==
After a hiatus, WRTI, in 2013, resumed broadcasting full-length concerts by the Philadelphia Orchestra on Sunday afternoons. Recorded each week at the Kimmel Center's Verizon Hall in Center City, this series brings the distinctive sound of the "Fabulous Philadelphians" in performance to the Delaware Valley airwaves.

WRTI presents in-concert performances of South Jersey's Symphony In C Orchestra, the Chamber Orchestra of Philadelphia, the Philadelphia Youth Orchestra and The Crossing, as well as opera performances from the Academy of Vocal Arts, OperaDelaware and the Opera Company of Philadelphia.

WRTI is a network affiliate of NPR, Public Radio International (PRI) and American Public Media (APM), airing news and arts programming from these networks. Programs include NPR's From The Top, and SymphonyCast. WRTI is also an affiliate of the WFMT Radio Network, broadcasting a wide range of programming from this Chicago-based syndicator, including concert broadcasts from the Chicago Symphony Orchestra, New York Philharmonic, San Francisco Symphony, the Deutsche Welle Festival Concert series on both the analog FM service and the digital HD2 service.

WRTI is also an affiliate of the Toll Brothers-Metropolitan Opera Radio Network, airing the Met's Saturday Matinee performances live from December through May each year. In the Met's off-season, WRTI broadcasts the American Opera Series from the WFMT Radio Network. This series features performances by the San Francisco, Los Angeles and Houston Grand Operas, as well as the Lyric Opera of Chicago. With these series, WRTI broadcasts a full-length opera every Saturday afternoon. WRTI's Mark Pinto hosts Overture, an opera "pre-game" of sorts, playing opera-based music, Saturday at 12-noon, just before the Saturday Opera Broadcast.

The award-winning Creatively Speaking general arts segments featured contributors Jim Cotter, David Patrick Stearns and Susan Lewis. Cotter formerly headed WRTI's Arts and Culture desk. The forerunner of these features was a 30-minute Saturday morning arts magazine show, also called Creatively Speaking, which was cancelled in early 2013. It was felt that splitting up the show in segments and spreading them throughout the broadcast day and week would better serve the audience. The features ended in 2018.

The Wanamaker Organ Hour, first aired in 2005, featured recordings of performances by Macy's Grand Court Organist Peter Richard Conte and various guests. The Wanamaker Organ is housed in Macy's Center City Philadelphia department store and is the largest musical instrument in the world. The program was co-produced by the Friends of the Wanamaker Organ and WRTI, and was an outgrowth of a segment, and later a live remote broadcast, on the CrossOver program. The Friends organization is responsible for the restoration and upkeep of this grand instrument. The show ended in 2017 when funding to the Friends was cut.

== Personalities ==
The station features hosts Mike Bolton, Bobbi Booker, Meg Bragle, Bob Craig, Rich Gunning, J. Michael Harrison, Hannah Rose Nicholas, David Ortiz, Mark Pinto, John T.K. Scherch, Nicole Sweeney, and Melinda Whiting.

Air personality Debra Lew Harder left the station on September 21, 2021, to become the host of the Metropolitan Opera radio broadcasts.

On September 30, 2025 after 14 years at the station Courtney Blue, host of Late Evening Jazz, was laid off due to “budgetary reductions.”

WRTI was known for several popular arts and culture based shows over the years. The multi-award-winning CrossOver, hosted by former classical host Jill Pasternak, explored music as "the universal language." The show, which presented music and conversation with some of the world's greatest artists and personalities, focused not only on classical and jazz, but also music in the periphery of those two art forms. Featured have been Michel Legrand, Rick Braun, Byron Janis, Billy Joel, Eric Whitacre, Marvin Hamlisch, Michael Feinstein, Louis Lortie, Herbie Hancock, Yolanda Kondonassis, Branford Marsalis, Michael Bublé and many more. The show was produced from 1998 until Ms. Pasternak's retirement in 2015. Dr. Jack Buerkle, a member of the Temple University faculty and jazz expert, was co-host until his retirement in 2003. Jill Pasternak died in 2025.

Discoveries From the Fleisher Collection, first aired in 2001, was hosted by Kile Smith, former curator of the Edwin A. Fleisher Collection of Orchestral Music at the Free Library of Philadelphia, the largest lending library of orchestral performance material in the world, and former WRTI classical host and program director, Jack Moore. The program featured recordings of orchestral scores and music housed at the Fleisher Collection. The program, a co-production of the Fleisher Collection and WRTI, was cancelled in 2018.

== HD Radio ==
Along with its regular analog FM signal, WRTI also broadcasts using HD Radio technology. Two WRTI network stations (WRTI and WRTJ) broadcast HD2 programming as well. Known as "WRTI-HD2," this auxiliary service broadcasts Jazz in the daytime and Classical music at night, opposite the station's analog/HD1 signal, thus providing a full 24 hours of classical and jazz programming for those with HD Radio receivers.

The programming of both WRTI and WRTI-HD2 also comprises two separate web audio streams. The "All-Classical" stream presents WRTI's daytime programming, switching to WRTI-HD2's programming at night. The "All-Jazz" stream broadcasts WRTI-HD2's daytime programming, switching to WRTI's analog/HD1 signal at night. The web streams have proven popular with those who do not have an HD Radio receiver or are not within the coverage area of WRTI and WRTJ.

== Repeater stations ==
WRTI fronts a network of six full-powered repeater stations. Combined with the main WRTI signal and numerous low-powered FM translators, their footprint covers much of eastern Pennsylvania, as well as most of Delaware and the southern half of New Jersey.

Call sign	Frequency	City of license	State	Facility ID	Class	ERP (W)	Height (m (ft))	Transmitter coordinates	Call sign assigned	Broadcast area
WRTX	91.7 FM (Note: Transmits in HD Radio)	Dover	Delaware	65181	A	580	96 m (315 ft)	39°12′3.4″N 75°33′53.7″W	July 12, 1991	Dover
WRTQ	91.3 FM	Ocean City	New Jersey	65176	B1	13,500 (vert.); 1,360 (horiz.)	120 m (390 ft)	39°19′14.4″N 74°46′16.6″W	May 5, 1993	Atlantic City
WRTJ	89.3 FM	Coatesville	Pennsylvania	90653	A	460 (vert.); 1 (horiz.)	87.5 m (287 ft)	40°01′26.4″N 75°48′46.8″W	July 11, 2007	Chester County
WRTL	90.7 FM	Ephrata	Pennsylvania	65177	A	650 (vert.); 1 (horiz.)	265 m (869 ft)	40°19′22.3″N 76°11′50.8″W	March 15, 1999	Lancaster and Lebanon
WRTY	91.1 FM	Jackson Township	Pennsylvania	65178	B1	3,500	264 m (866 ft)	41°02′40.3″N 75°22′43.6″W	August 20, 1990	Mount Pocono
WJAZ	91.7 FM	Summerdale	Pennsylvania	65184	A	1,000 (analog); 100 (digital)	214 m (702 ft)	40°18′20.3″N 77°0′25.9″W	July 27, 1990	Harrisburg

=== Translators ===
Three full-power stations have translators that are licensed to simulcast the programming of their respective stations.

Call sign	Frequency	City of license	State	Facility ID	Rebroadcasts
W299BH	107.7 FM	Marshallton	Delaware	142393	WRTI
W246AA	97.1 FM	Allentown	Pennsylvania	65183	WRTI
W214AL	90.7 FM	Denver	Pennsylvania	65193	WRTI
W221DG	92.1 FM	Exton	Pennsylvania	142298	WRTI
W256AB	99.1 FM	Pottsville	Pennsylvania	65179	WRTY
W249AT	97.7 FM	Reading	Pennsylvania	65182	WRTI
W291AP	106.1 FM	Scranton	Pennsylvania	65180	WRTY
W259BU	99.7 FM	York	Pennsylvania	65187	WJAZ

== See also ==
- List of jazz radio stations in the United States
