= Rich Gunning =

American announcer (born 1966)

- Born: Richard Gunning; June 15, 1966 (age 59); Philadelphia, Pennsylvania, U.S.
- Occupations: Radio personality, traffic reporter, voice actor
- Years active: 1984–present
- Military career
- Allegiance: United States
- Branch: U.S. Army
- Service years: 1986-1994
- Website: richgunning.com

Rich Gunning (born June 15, 1966) is an American voice-over artist, radio commercial producer and former traffic reporter based in Philadelphia, Pennsylvania.

== Early life and education ==
Gunning was born in Philadelphia in 1966. He attended Council Rock High School in Newtown, Pennsylvania and the University of Maryland.

== Career ==
He began his broadcasting career in the mid-1980s as a radio disc-jockey with former oldies station WBUX in Doylestown, Pennsylvania. In 1986, he joined the United States Army and served two years at AFRTS in Germany. He was on active duty and the reserves until 1994. In addition to part-time on-air work at radio stations WDEL and WSTW in Wilmington, Delaware, Gunning served as production manager and on-air personality with suburban Philadelphia news/talk radio station WNPV from 1994 to 2010.

Since 1998, Gunning has voiced hundreds of radio and television commercials, including Alarm.com, AOL, Burger King, Hawaii Tourism, Pontiac, Sears Auto Center, and Triumph Motorcycles Ltd.

From 2004 to 2018, he was employed by iHeart Media as a traffic reporter, heard primarily on KYW news radio in Philadelphia, and stations in Pittsburgh, New Jersey, and Delaware.

In 2016, Gunning joined the staff at Philadelphia's Classical and Jazz station WRTI as an on-air personality.
