= Holland, Pennsylvania =

Unincorporated community in Pennsylvania, US

Holland
- unincorporated community
- Location of Holland in Pennsylvania Holland (the United States)
- Coordinates: 40°12′03″N 74°58′19″W
- Country: United States
- State: Pennsylvania
- County: Bucks
- Township: Northampton
- Elevation: 161 ft (49 m)
- Time zone: UTC-5 (EST)
  - Summer (DST): UTC-4 (EDT)
- Postal code: 18966
- Area codes: 215, 267, and 445

Holland is an unincorporated community in Northampton Township, Bucks County, Pennsylvania, United States. It is located next to Newtown, Richboro, and Churchville. One of its communities is Village Shires, which has approximately 4,000 residents.

== History ==
Holland, the core of which is situated at the junction of Ironworks and Mill Creek, was originally known as Rocksville due to the rocky banks of Mill Creek situated alongside it. Rocksville was renamed to Holland in 1870 with the building of a postal office due to the many Dutch settlers in the area who settled in 17th and 18th century. A gristmill and a general store were operated at the core of Holland by the Finney family. The general store has been converted to a restaurant, while the gristmill was renovated into Mill Race Inn. The gristmill was powered by the Mill Creek dam which eventually collapsed after torrential rains in 2001. The building currently stands in a dilapidated state. Despite its proximity to Philadelphia, Holland was rural for much of its history.

A building boom in the 1970s resulted in a significant increase in housing capacity replacing the large tracts of farmland, mainly in the form of large tract housing developments (e.g. Hillcrestshire, located off of Buck Road). Since then, the town has seen additional growth, becoming a prototypical commuter bedroom community for suburban families. The area's proximity to both Philadelphia and the Trenton/Princeton, New Jersey area make Holland a desirable location, despite its lack of public transit.

Holland is located in the Council Rock School District, and is home to several of the district's schools: Council Rock High School South, Holland Middle School (formerly Holland Junior High, and prior to that Council Rock Intermediate School (CRIS)- Holland), Holland Elementary, Hillcrest Elementary, and Rolling Hills Elementary. Holland is also home to several private Catholic schools: Villa Joseph Marie High School, an all-girls school, and St Katharine Drexel Regional Catholic School, affiliated with St Bede the Venerable Parish.

== Passenger trains ==
=== History ===
Holland's growth as a commuter haven took place in the mid-1980s, just after the town lost its passenger trains. Regularly scheduled train service lasted until January 14, 1983 via SEPTA's Fox Chase Rapid Transit Line. The station, and all of those north of Fox Chase, were closed due to failing diesel train equipment that the then-cash-strapped SEPTA could not afford to rehabilitate. As a result, ridership was low and the service cancelled on a "temporary" basis. As such, Holland Station still appears in SEPTA's publicly posted tariffs.

Although rail service was initially replaced with a Fox Chase-Newtown shuttle bus, patronage remained light. The traveling public never saw a bus service as a suitable replacement for a rail service, and the Fox Chase-Newtown shuttle bus service ended in 1999.

The Holland shelter was demolished in the summer of 2000, shortly after bus service was terminated.

=== Resumption of train service ===
In the ensuing years since 1983, there has been heavy interest by both residents and politicians in resuming passenger service to Holland.

In September 2009, the Southampton-based Pennsylvania Transit Expansion Coalition (PA-TEC) began discussions with township officials along the railway, as well as SEPTA officials, about the realistic possibility of resuming even minimal passenger service to relieve traffic congestion in the region. Plans call for completing the electrification to Newtown, as originally planned in the late 1970s.

PA-TEC's efforts have received overwhelming bipartisan support by both Bucks and Montgomery County officials, as well as at the state level, despite SEPTA's overall reservations. However, SEPTA has also confirmed they are willing to reestablish regular commuter service if strong political support exists in both counties.

== Education ==
Northampton Township is part of the Council Rock School District.

St. Katharine Drexel Regional Catholic School is the local Catholic grade school. In 2012 St. Bede the Venerable School in Holland merged with Assumption B.V.M. Catholic School in Feasterville to form St. Katharine Drexel.

== Notable people ==
Notable current and former residents include the following:

- Greg Cochrane, soccer player
- Catherine Corcoran, actress
- Anthony Green, current lead singer of the band Circa Survive
- James C. Greenwood, former U.S. Representative
- Shannon James, Playboy Playmate of the Month (May 2007)
- Jenn McAllister, YouTuber
- Justin Pugh, offensive tackle, Syracuse University, selected in the first round of the 2013 NFL draft by the New York Giants
- Matt Walsh, former Florida Gators basketball star and a former player with the NBA's Miami Heat
