= R. J. Umberger =

American ice hockey player (born 1982)

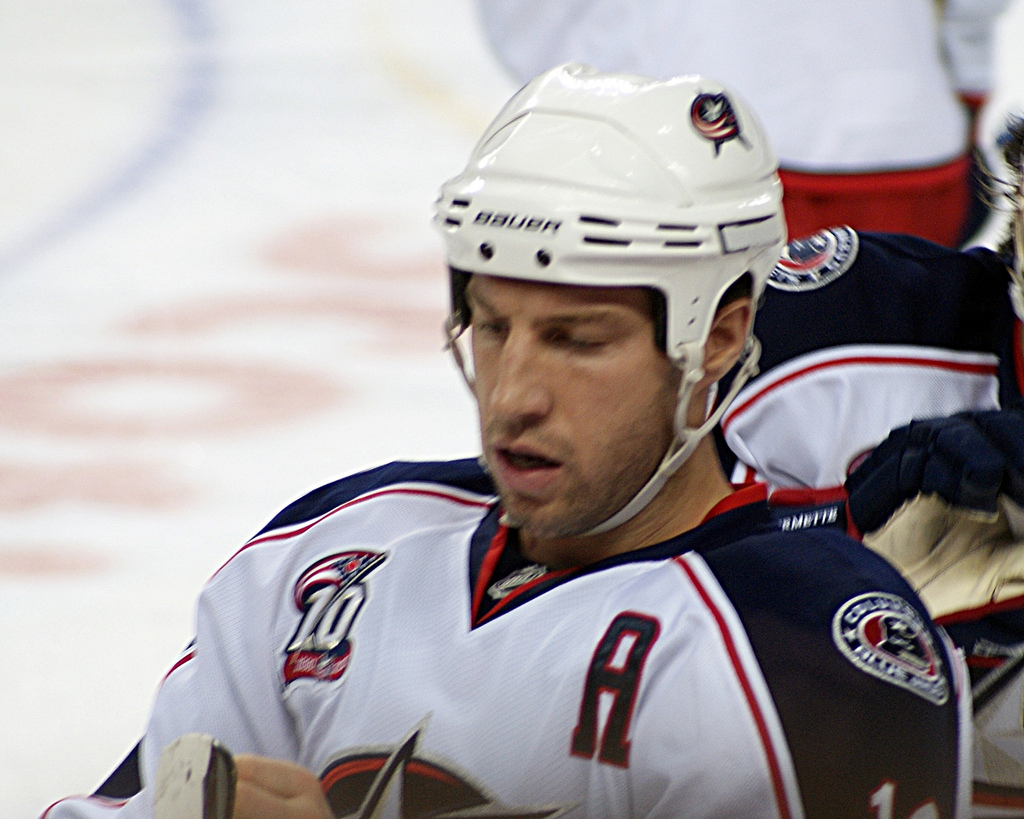
- Umberger with the Columbus Blue Jackets in 2010
- Born: May 3, 1982 (age 44) Pittsburgh, Pennsylvania, U.S.
- Height: 6 ft 2 in (188 cm)
- Weight: 214 lb (97 kg; 15 st 4 lb)
- Position: Center
- Shot: Left
- Played for: Philadelphia Flyers; Columbus Blue Jackets
- National team: United States
- NHL draft: 16th overall, 2001; Vancouver Canucks
- Playing career: 2004–2016

Richard Alan "R. J." Umberger, Jr. (born May 3, 1982) is an American former professional ice hockey center. Drafted in the first round, 16th overall, in the 2001 NHL entry draft by the Vancouver Canucks, Umberger has played in the National Hockey League (NHL) for the Philadelphia Flyers and Columbus Blue Jackets.

== Playing career ==
=== Minor/College ===
Umberger, who is both a left winger and center, played his high school hockey in the Western Pennsylvania Interscholastic Hockey League (WPIHL) for the Plum Mustangs in 1997 and 1998. In his sophomore year and final season, he accumulated 116 points in just 26 games. He capped off that season by scoring the game-winning goal in double overtime against Central Catholic (Pittsburgh) to win the WPIHL AAA League Championship in front of a packed house at the BladeRunners Ice Complex in Harmarville. His efforts were recognized in 2006 when the Mustangs raised his number to the rafters of its home rink, the Center Ice Arena in Delmont. He was inducted into the Plum High School Sports Hall of Fame in 2012.

Umberger is recognized annually with the R. J. Umberger Award for the PA Hockey Scholastic Showcase, a scholastic tournament played in December each year. The Tournament has a Wall of Champions at Harmarille BladeRunners. During his short prep career, Umberger was named to the All Tournament Team both years.

Umberger began his career with the USA Hockey National Team Development Program after a successful developmental career with the Pittsburgh Hornets. He then started his college career with Ohio State University. He was drafted in the 2001 NHL entry draft in the first round, 16th overall, by the Vancouver Canucks. Umberger left Ohio State before his senior year, intending to turn professional with the Canucks. He was unable to reach a deal, however, and sat out the entire 2003–04 season. He was then traded to the New York Rangers on March 9, 2004, along with Martin Grenier, in exchange for Martin Ručinský, but was later signed as a free agent by the Philadelphia Flyers on June 16, 2004, just three months later. He was called up to the Flyers roster in the 2005–06 season.

=== Professional ===
He scored his first career NHL goal on November 22, 2005, for the Flyers against the Lightning. On July 6, 2006, the Flyers announced that they had signed him to a two-year contract.

On June 20, 2008, Umberger was traded from the Flyers with their fourth round pick (Drew Olson) in the 2008 NHL entry draft to the Columbus Blue Jackets for the Blue Jackets' first round pick, via the Colorado Avalanche (Luca Sbisa) drafted 19th overall and a third round pick (Marc-André Bourdon) in the Draft.

On April 16, 2009, Umberger scored the Blue Jackets' first ever playoff goal in a 4–1 loss at the Detroit Red Wings in the first round of the 2009 Stanley Cup playoffs. He also scored in Games 3 and 4 as Detroit eventually swept the series, four games to none.

On September 21, 2011, Umberger signed a five-year contract extension with the Blue Jackets.

On June 23, 2014, Umberger was traded along with a 2015 fourth-round draft pick, back to the Philadelphia Flyers in exchange for forward Scott Hartnell.

After two largely unproductive and injury hampered seasons in his return to Philadelphia, on June 16, 2016, the Flyers bought out the final year of Umberger's contract.

Upon sitting out the entirety of the 2016–17 season, Umberger attempted to resurrect his NHL career in signing a professional tryout agreement with the Dallas Stars on July 14, 2017. He participated in the Stars training camp and pre-season before he was released from his try-out without a contract on September 27, 2017.

== International play ==
Umberger has represented USA Hockey on multiple occasions. His first international effort came with the U.S. under-18 team at the 2000 IIHF World U18 Championships in Switzerland, where the Americans placed eighth. He played in the same tournament the following year, 2001, where the U.S. improved to fifth-place.

That same year, 2001, Umberger also played with the U.S. junior team in the 2001 World Junior Ice Hockey Championships in Russia, as well as the 2002 edition in the Czech Republic; the U.S. placed fifth in both tournaments.

Umberger made his senior U.S. debut in the 2006 IIHF World Championship in Latvia.

== Career statistics ==
=== Regular season and playoffs ===
			Regular season					Playoffs
Season	Team	League	GP	G	A	Pts	PIM	GP	G	A	Pts	PIM
1997–98	Plum High School	HS-PA	23	58	50	108	—	—	—	—	—	—
1998–99	US NTDP Juniors	USHL	5	2	2	4	0	—	—	—	—	—
1998–99	US NTDP U18	NAHL	50	21	21	42	32	—	—	—	—	—
1999–00	US NTDP Juniors	USHL	57	33	35	68	20	—	—	—	—	—
2000–01	Ohio State University	CCHA	32	14	23	37	18	—	—	—	—	—
2001–02	Ohio State University	CCHA	37	18	21	39	31	—	—	—	—	—
2002–03	Ohio State University	CCHA	43	26	27	53	16	—	—	—	—	—
2004–05	Philadelphia Phantoms	AHL	80	21	44	65	36	21	3	7	10	12
2005–06	Philadelphia Phantoms	AHL	8	3	7	10	8	—	—	—	—	—
2005–06	Philadelphia Flyers	NHL	73	20	18	38	18	5	1	0	1	2
2006–07	Philadelphia Flyers	NHL	81	16	12	28	41	—	—	—	—	—
2007–08	Philadelphia Flyers	NHL	74	13	37	50	19	17	10	5	15	10
2008–09	Columbus Blue Jackets	NHL	82	26	20	46	53	4	3	0	3	0
2009–10	Columbus Blue Jackets	NHL	82	23	32	55	40	—	—	—	—	—
2010–11	Columbus Blue Jackets	NHL	82	25	32	57	38	—	—	—	—	—
2011–12	Columbus Blue Jackets	NHL	77	20	20	40	27	—	—	—	—	—
2012–13	Columbus Blue Jackets	NHL	48	8	10	18	16	—	—	—	—	—
2013–14	Columbus Blue Jackets	NHL	74	18	16	34	26	4	0	1	1	2
2014–15	Philadelphia Flyers	NHL	67	9	6	15	19	—	—	—	—	—
2015–16	Philadelphia Flyers	NHL	39	2	9	11	15	—	—	—	—	—
NHL totals			779	180	212	392	312	30	14	6	20	14

=== International ===
Year	Team	Event	Result	GP	G	A	Pts	PIM
2000	United States	WJC18	8th	6	1	0	1	2
2001	United States	WJC	5th	7	2	2	4	2
2001	United States	WJC18	6th	6	1	0	1	0
2002	United States	WJC	5th	7	1	4	5	0
2006	United States	WC	7th	1	0	0	0	0
Junior totals				26	5	6	11	4
Senior totals				1	0	0	0	0

== Awards and achievements ==
Award	Year
All-CCHA Rookie Team	2000–01
CCHA Rookie of the Year	2000–01
All-CCHA First Team	2002–03
AHCA West Second-Team All-American	2002–03
Calder Cup Philadelphia Phantoms	2004–05

Awards and achievements
Preceded by Chris Gobert	CCHA Rookie of the Year; 2000–01	Succeeded by Pat Dwyer
Preceded by Nathan Smith	Vancouver Canucks first-round draft pick 2001	Succeeded by Ryan Kesler
