= Council Rock School District =

School district in Pennsylvania

Address
- 30 North Chancellor Street Newtown, Bucks County, Pennsylvania, 18940; United States

District information
- Type: Public
- Grades: K-12
- Superintendent: Dr. Andrew J. Sanko, Ed.d

Other information
- Website: www.crsd.org

The Council Rock School District, also known as CRSD, is located in lower Bucks County, in southeastern Pennsylvania. The District's administrative offices are located in one of the original school district buildings in Newtown, Pennsylvania. The building, The Chancellor Center, formerly known as The Chancellor Street School, dates back to 1871 and was remodeled in 2003. As of October 2023, the district's total enrollment is 10,501.

The school district spends over US$15,000 per secondary student per year (as of 2021), not including special education students. This puts them at 19th in the state for spending per student. According to the district's website, the final budget for the 2021–2022 school year allocated over $250M to the district. The district operates two high schools (grades 9-12), two middle schools (grades 7-8), ten elementary schools (grades K-6), and an alternative school called The STAR Center which houses The Sloan School, The Twilight School, and The A.C.H.I.E.V.E. Program.

The district covers 75 square miles (190 km^{2}) and comprises five Bucks County municipalities:

- Newtown
- Newtown Township
- Northampton Township
- Upper Makefield Township
- Wrightstown Township

The district's current Superintendent of Schools is Andrew J. Sanko.

== Overview ==
As of the 2020 U.S. census, the total population of the school district is 74,221. As of October 2023, the school district educates 10,501 students, K-12, and has approximately 956 teachers and supervisors, as well as clerical, custodial, and maintenance employees who support the instructional program. Contract employees for Food Service (Aramark) and Transportation (Durham School Services) round out the support personnel. The school district is the 11th-largest employer in the area.

The school district operates sixteen schools in total: ten elementary schools (grades K-6), two middle schools (grades 7-8), two high schools (grades 9-12), and one alternative high school. Council Rock is also one of four school districts participating with the Middle Bucks Institute of Technology located in Jamison, Pennsylvania.

Council Rock had only one high school until the 2002-2003 academic year when they added a second high school, Council Rock High School South, to alleviate overcrowding at Council Rock High School North. Prior to 1969, the high school was located in the building used for the Newtown Middle School. Prior to that, the high school was located in a smaller building on Chancellor Street in Newtown; a building that later became Chancellor Street Elementary school before closing in 2002. The Chancellor Street school was extensively renovated and reopened as The Chancellor Center.

== Schools ==
=== High schools ===
- Council Rock High School North
- Council Rock High School South
- The Sloan School

=== Middle schools ===
- Newtown Middle School
- Holland Middle School

=== Elementary schools ===
- Goodnoe Elementary School, Newtown, Pennsylvania
- Sol Feinstone Elementary School, Newtown, Pennsylvania
- Newtown Elementary School, Newtown, Pennsylvania
- Churchville Elementary School, Churchville, Pennsylvania
- Hillcrest Elementary School, Holland, Pennsylvania
- Holland Elementary School, Holland, Pennsylvania
- Maureen M. Welch Elementary School, Churchville, Pennsylvania
- Richboro Elementary School, Richboro, Pennsylvania
- Rolling Hills Elementary School, Holland, Pennsylvania
- Wrightstown Elementary School, Wrightstown, Pennsylvania

== Awards ==
- 2011 to 2024 NAMM Founcation Best Communities for Music Education
- 2022 National Blue Ribbon School - Council Rock High School South
- 2019 Great District for Great Teachers

== Teacher strike ==
In mid-2000, reports revealed that teachers in the Council Rock School District were considering the possibility of going on strike. At the time, Council Rock's teachers were the highest paid in the state, with a median salary of $85,395 per year, not including benefits. Despite the high salaries, the school district averted a strike by offering the Council Rock teachers union (CREA) a contract that included a pay raise for 62% of teachers and dropped a proposal for merit pay. The strike was resolved at 4:30 am on September 6, 2002, after an 11-hour negotiation session.
