= Council Rock High School North =

Public school in Pennsylvania, U.S.

Coordinates: 40.23127°N 74.94491°W

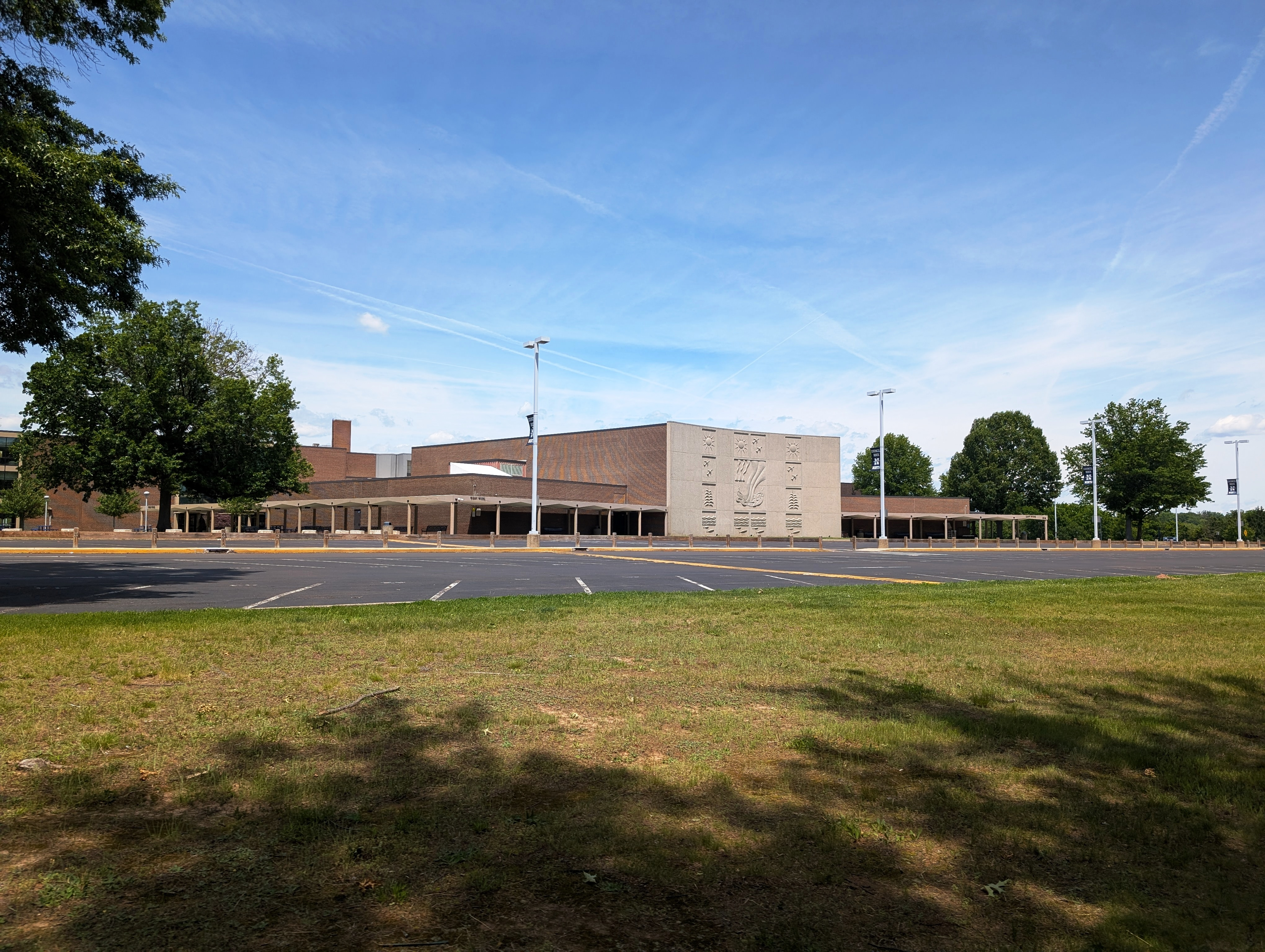
- 62 Swamp Road, Newtown, Pennsylvania; United States

Information
- Type: Public
- Established: 1969
- School district: Council Rock School District
- Principal: Jason Traczykiewicz
- Teaching staff: 125.80 (on an FTE basis)
- Grades: 9–12
- Enrollment: 1,623 (2023–2024)
- Student to teacher ratio: 12.90
- Colors: Navy blue, white, silver
- Rival: Council Rock South
- Yearbook: Polaris
- Website: crnorth.crsd.org

Council Rock High School North is a high school located in Newtown, Pennsylvania. It is a part of the Council Rock School District. The school is located across from Newtown Middle School and Tyler State Park, and near Bucks County Community College. The current student population is 1,674 for grades 9–12.

The school is three stories tall and is divided into an East wing and a West wing. Until 2006, there was no direct connection between the third floors on each wing, so students and staff had to use hallways on the first or second floor to cross between wings.

When originally constructed, the school was the only high school in the district and was known simply as "Council Rock High School". As the local population continued to grow, a new high school, Council Rock High School South, was built in Holland, Pennsylvania, which opened in the fall of 2002, and "North" was added to the original school's name. When the new school was opened, middle schools were re-districted with Holland Middle School students attending Council Rock South and Newtown Middle School and the now closed Richboro Middle School students attending Council Rock North.

The school colors are navy blue, white, and silver, and the school sports teams are known as the Council Rock Indians. After the split in 2002, silver was given to North and gold given to South to distinguish them while still maintaining the two traditional colors of the original high school.

The school and the school district are named for Council Rock, also known as Indian Rock, a rock outcropping that forms a cliff in Tyler State Park. This rock was once a council rock for Lenape Indians living in the area.

== Academics ==
In 2021, U.S. News & World Report ranked Council Rock High School North 33rd in Pennsylvania and 1,030th nationally among high schools.

Council Rock High School North offers 19 Advanced Placement courses. The Advanced Placement participation rate at the school is 48%. Council Rock North is known as one of the top tier public schools in the Bucks County Region.

Among the 2009 graduates, ten were named valedictorians, 17 were named National Merit Semi-Finalists (outscoring 99.5% of all PSAT test-takers), 20 were named National Merit Commended students, and all 17 semi-finalists attained finalist status. In the 2008–09 school year, 45 students were named Advanced Placement Scholars. SAT scores routinely exceed the national and state averages; Critical Reading, Writing and Math average scores were 550, 546 and 568, respectively. The difference, for all three sections combined, in national average SAT scores and Council Rock North student average SAT scores is 163 points.

Philadelphia magazine recognized Council Rock High School North as one of the top schools in the Philadelphia Metropolitan Area; Council Rock High Schools were the only high schools in Bucks County named to the "50 Best Schools List" (2004). Council Rock High School North ranked as the top public school in Bucks County in 2005, 2006, and 2008. Newsweek ranked Council Rock High School North as one of America's top schools in 2007. Mid-Atlantic Construction magazine recognized Council Rock North's renovations as the "Project of the Year" in the K–12 category.

== Athletics ==
Council Rock North running back Blake Koch in September 2011

Council Rock High School North sports teams have won multiple local and state championships. Rivalries include sister school Council Rock South.

- Baseball/Softball The 2007 and 2009 Baseball varsity team made it to the quarterfinals of the Pennsylvania state tournament.
- Basketball The Men's Basketball team has won 12 Conference Championships. The 2010-11 team won a school record 27 games and finished the season ranked regionally by ESPN and USA Today.
- Bowling
- Cheerleading
- Cross Country: The 2008 women's team went undefeated. The Varsity team took 7th at the PIAA State Championships, and the Junior Varsity team won both the league and district. The Varsity men's team took 6th at the PIAA State Championships. The men's Cross Country team has won 11 state titles.
- Football: The 2006 varsity football team had an undefeated regular season.
- Field hockey
- Golf
- Ice hockey
- Lacrosse
- Soccer: Council Rock North Men's Soccer was ranked third in the nation on espnrise.com during the 2009 season for over three weeks. In 2006, the Men's Varsity Soccer team won the PIAA championship.
- Softball
- Swimming: As of 2020, the women's team has been undefeated in the SOL Championships for 12 consecutive years, whereas the men's team has been undefeated for 4 years.
- Tennis: Men's (spring) and Women's (fall)
- Track
- Volleyball
- Wrestling

== Performing arts ==
=== Band ===
The Council Rock North Band Program has approximately 100 students participating in many ensembles, including Concert Band, Symphonic Band, Jazz Band, Marching Band, Indoor Color Guard, and Indoor Percussion.

The Council Rock North Marching Band is the 2025 USBands Group IIA Pennsylvania State Champions and National Champions,and the 2026 Group IVA Pennsylvania State Champions and National Champions.

=== Orchestra ===
The Council Rock North Orchestra has approximately 5 members in different ensembles, including String Orchestra, Symphonic Orchestra, Pit Orchestra, and Chamber Quartet. String Orchestra and Symphonic Orchestra include all of the string musicians at the school, while other groups, like the Pit Orchestra or Chamber Quartet, require auditions and are more difficult to be accepted into.

== Notable alumni ==
- Brent Billingsley – Major League Baseball Player 1996–2005. Florida Marlins, Montreal Expos, Colorado Rockies, Philadelphia Phillies
- Christopher R. Cooke – Auxiliary Bishop for the Archdiocese of Philadelphia
- Brandon Cottom – professional football player
- Jillian Parry Fry – 2000 Miss Teen USA
- Anthony Green – lead singer of band Circa Survive; also involved with many bands originating in Philadelphia area
- James C. Greenwood – former federal Congressman representing 8th District of Pennsylvania
- Paul Guenther – former defensive coordinator of NFL's Las Vegas Raiders and Cincinnati Bengals
- Rich Gunning (born 1966) – announcer and voice over artist
- Ibrahim Kayumi – alleged terrorist accused of carrying out a bombing attempt in New York City
- Ro Khanna – member of the U.S. House of Representatives from California's 17th district
- Ryan Lexer (born 1976) – American-Israeli basketball player
- Brandon McIlwain – baseball player in the New York Mets organization and former college football quarterback for the South Carolina Gamecocks and California Golden Bears
- Laura Owen – businesswoman and former Kansas Secretary of Commerce
- Gina Sicilia – singer/songwriter
- Dennis Woodside – president, Impossible Foods; former COO, Dropbox; former CEO, Motorola Mobility
- Jay Wright – former basketball head coach, Villanova
