= Council Rock High School South =

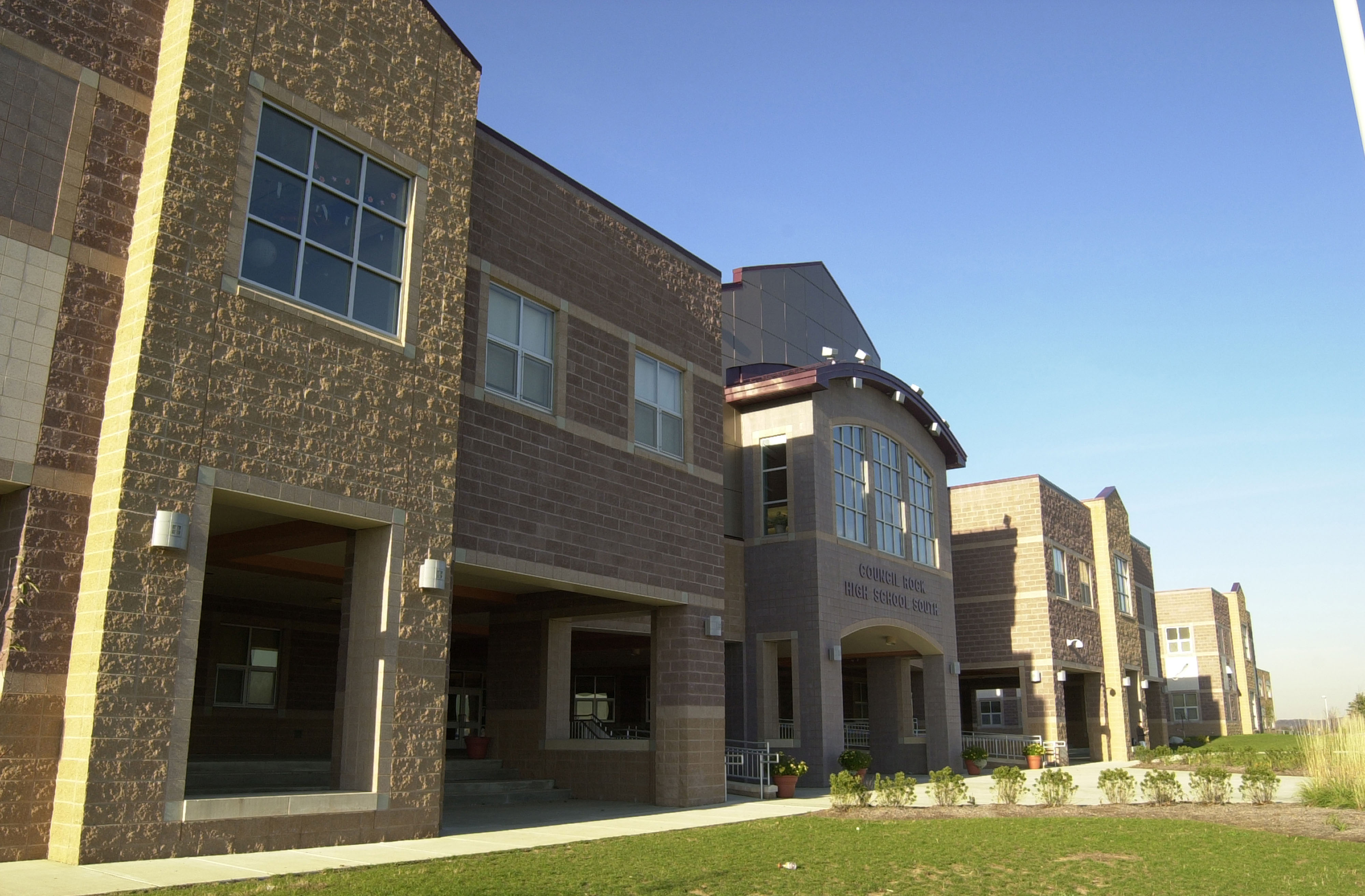

Location
- 2002 Rock Way; Holland, Pennsylvania 18966; United States; 40.213°N 74.976°W

Information
- Type: Public high school
- Motto: Success for every student, every day
- Established: 2002; 24 years ago
- School district: Council Rock School District
- Principal: John Radick
- Teaching staff: 130.30 (FTE)
- Grades: 9–12
- Enrollment: 1,946 (2023–2024)
- Student to teacher ratio: 14.93
- Colors: Navy, White, Gold
- Mascot: Golden Hawks
- Rival: Council Rock North
- Yearbook: The Talon
- Website: www.crsd.org/o/crsouth

Council Rock High School South is a public high school located in Holland, Pennsylvania. It is operated by the Council Rock School District.

The school was built in 2002, in order to address the overpopulation at what was then the district's only high school, now known as Council Rock High School North. South currently serves grades 9–12 and houses over 2,000 students.

The school colors are blue, white, and gold, and the sports teams are known as The Golden Hawks.

== Notable alumni ==
- Greg Cochrane, former professional soccer player
- Jenn McAllister, YouTube personality
- Justin Pugh, former professional football player, Arizona Cardinals and New York Giants
