= Newtown Historic District (Newtown, Pennsylvania) =

Historic district in Pennsylvania, United States

- U.S. National Register of Historic Places
- U.S. Historic district
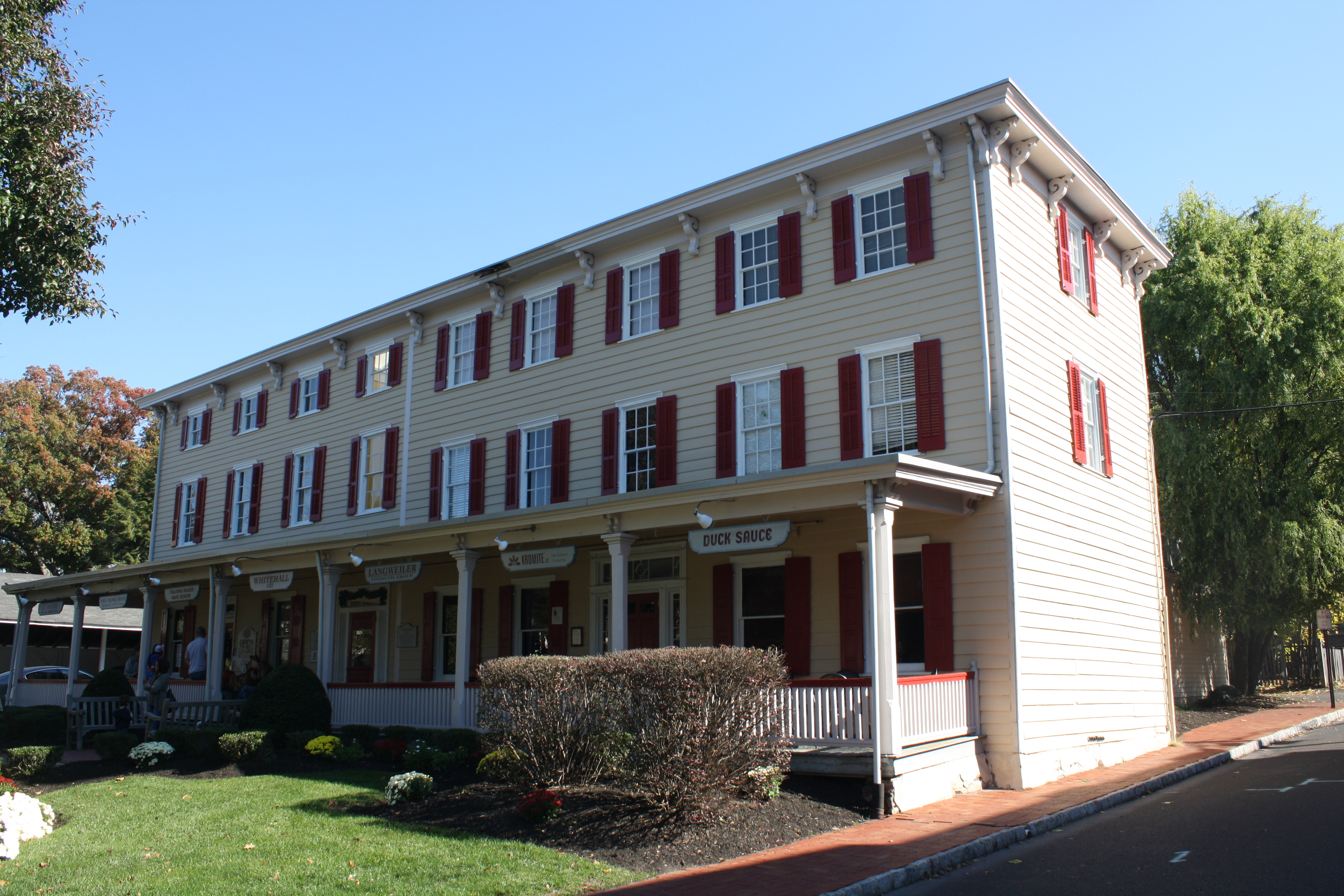
- White Hall, Newtown Historic District, October 2012

- Location within Pennsylvania Location within the United States
- Location: PA 413 and PA 332, Parts of Congress, Chancellor and Liberty Sts. N of Washington Ave. and Chancellor St. S of Penn St. to S. State St., Newtown, Pennsylvania
- Coordinates: 40°13′39″N 74°56′11″W
- Area: 172.3 acres (69.7 ha)
- Architect: Phillip Bros.; Firman, Joseph
- Architectural style: Greek Revival, Late Victorian, Federal, Queen Anne, Gothic Revival
- NRHP reference No.: 79002174, 86000315, 86002867
- Added to NRHP: December 17, 1979, February 25, 1986, October 28, 1986

The Newtown Historic District is a national historic district that is located in Newtown, Bucks County, Pennsylvania. It includes 293 contributing buildings in the borough of Newtown, which date from the late-17th century to the early-20th century and are reflective of a number of popular architectural styles including Greek Revival, Late Victorian, Federal, Queen Anne, and Gothic Revival. Notable buildings include the Chapman Buckman House and mill, Hart House, Newtown Hardware House, Keller Building, Jenks House (1828), White Hall Hotel, Temperance House (1774), Smock House (1792), the Brick Hotel, St. Luke's Church, LaRue Apartments (1838), and the Edward Hicks House. Located in the district and listed separately are the Half-Moon Inn and Friends Meeting House. It was added to the National Register of Historic Places in 1979, with two boundary increases in 1986.

== District listings ==
=== Newtown Hardware House ===
The Newtown Hardware House is an independently owned hardware store located at 106 S. State Street that was included as a contributing property in the original listing of the district on the National Register of Historic Places in 1979.

==== History ====
The Newtown Hardware House was built in 1869 by Cyrus Hillborn and Harrison C. Worstall at 106-108 South State Street. 108 South State Street was a hardware store operated by Hillborn and Worstall, and 106 South State Street was a dry goods store operated by George E. Dolton. Mr. Dolton sold his side to George H. McMaster in 1908. When McMaster died in 1927, both sides of the store were taken over by H.C. Worstall, and later bought out by John J. Burns. When Burns died in 1955, Robert M. Davis bought the business and operated it until 1985, when it was taken over by C. David Callahan. In 2012, C. David Callahan sold the business to William Newell of Newtown and remained on as a part-time employee.

==== Newtown Library Company ====
The Newtown Library Company was founded August 9, 1760. Initially the name was simply Library Company and the word Newtown was not added until March 27, 1789. The collection of books and the Company's effects were to be kept at the librarian Joseph Thorton's house(at that time The Court Inn and later to be called The Half-Moon Inn.)

Edward Robert Barnsley wrote in "Newtown Library Under Two Kings published 1938, "David Twining carried the same relationship to the Newtown Library Company that Benjamin Franklin did to the Library Company of Philadelphia. He was the motive power of the library all through the difficult days of formation and development.

==== Fire ====
The Newtown Hardware House was destroyed by fire on March 1, 1899. In addition to the Hardware store another store was completely burned. The loss was estimated at $80,000. The fire was one of the worst in Newtown's history. It is thought burglars set the building on fire. The building was rebuilt to the exact specifications of the original building and was reopened by Christmas of the same year and is still in operation. Today, when looking at the rear wall, lower left(Northern) portion of the structure, a distinct brick line exists that outlines surviving brickwork dating before 1899.

==== Oldest business in Newtown Pennsylvania ====
The Newtown Hardware House has been in continuous operation for over 151 years, which ranks as the longest tenure for any single business in Newtown. The hardware store announced it was going out of business in 2012: City residents heard about the possibility that the hardware store may go out of business, so they organized a "Cash mob": a crowd of people arrived at the business to pump up sales. In 2011 the store was in trouble, and by 2012 the store's owner Dave Callahan decided to go out of business. Bill and Peggy Newell took over the hardware store. They purchased the business from Dave Callahan.

== Gallery ==
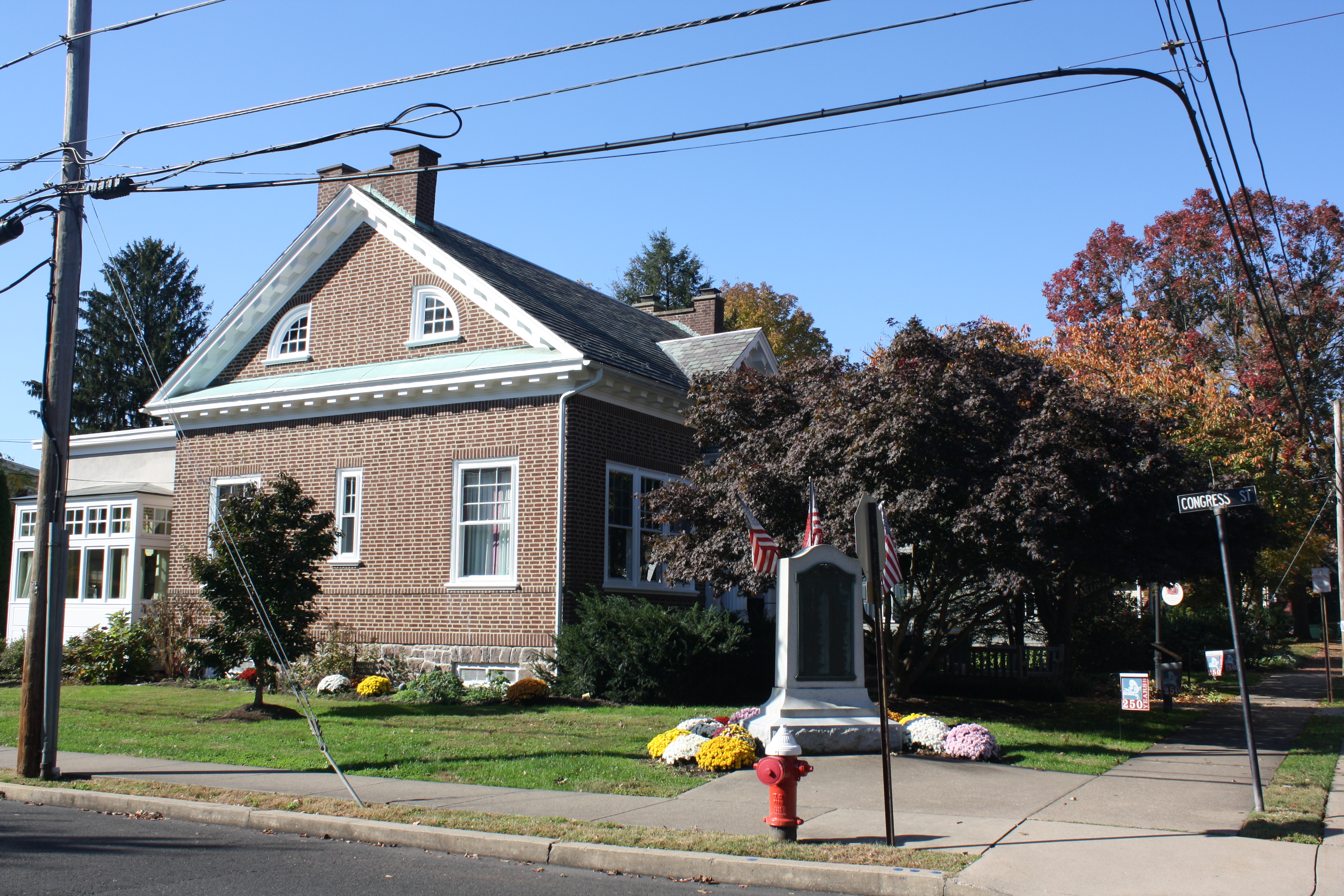
Newtown Library Company.

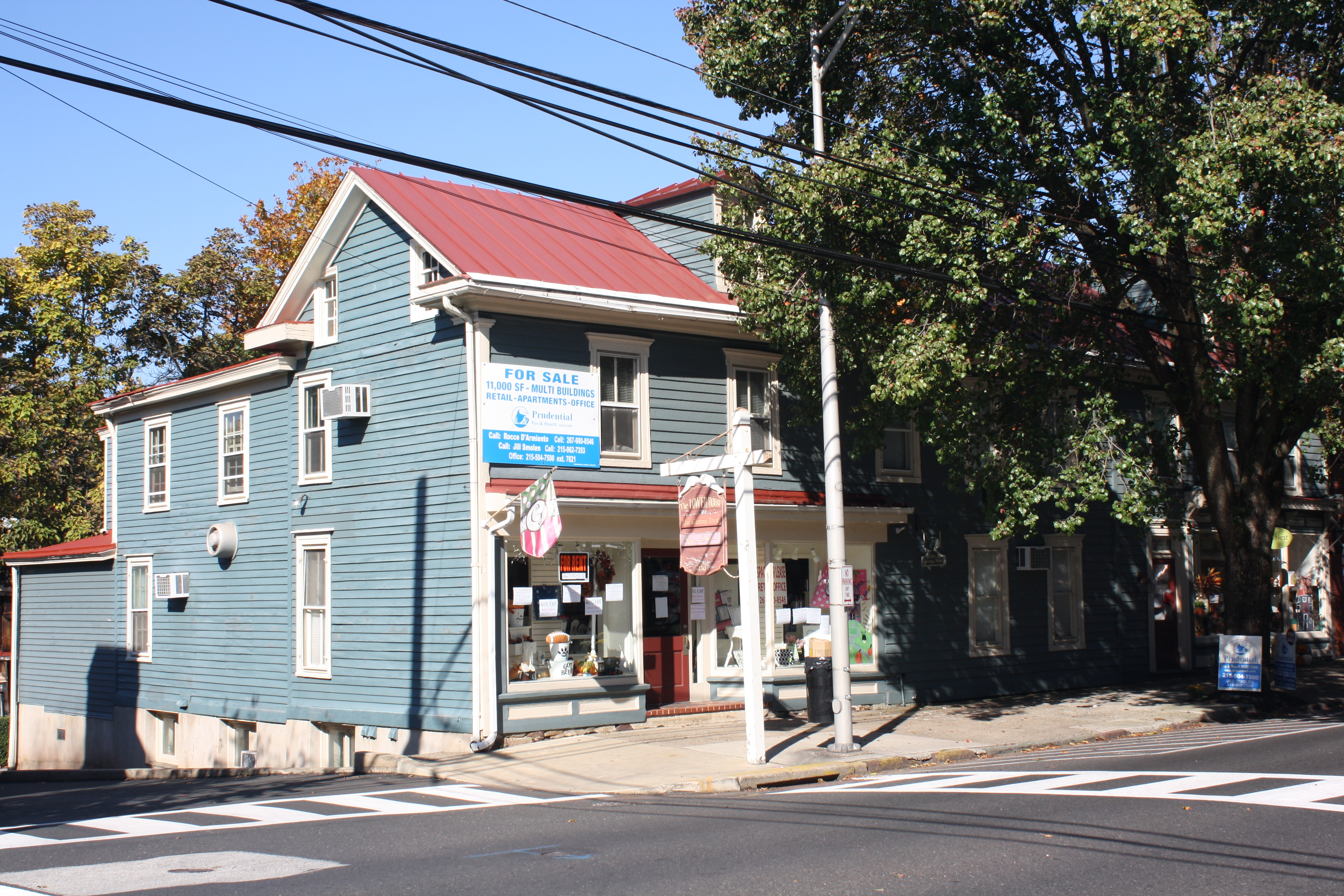
The Lower House.

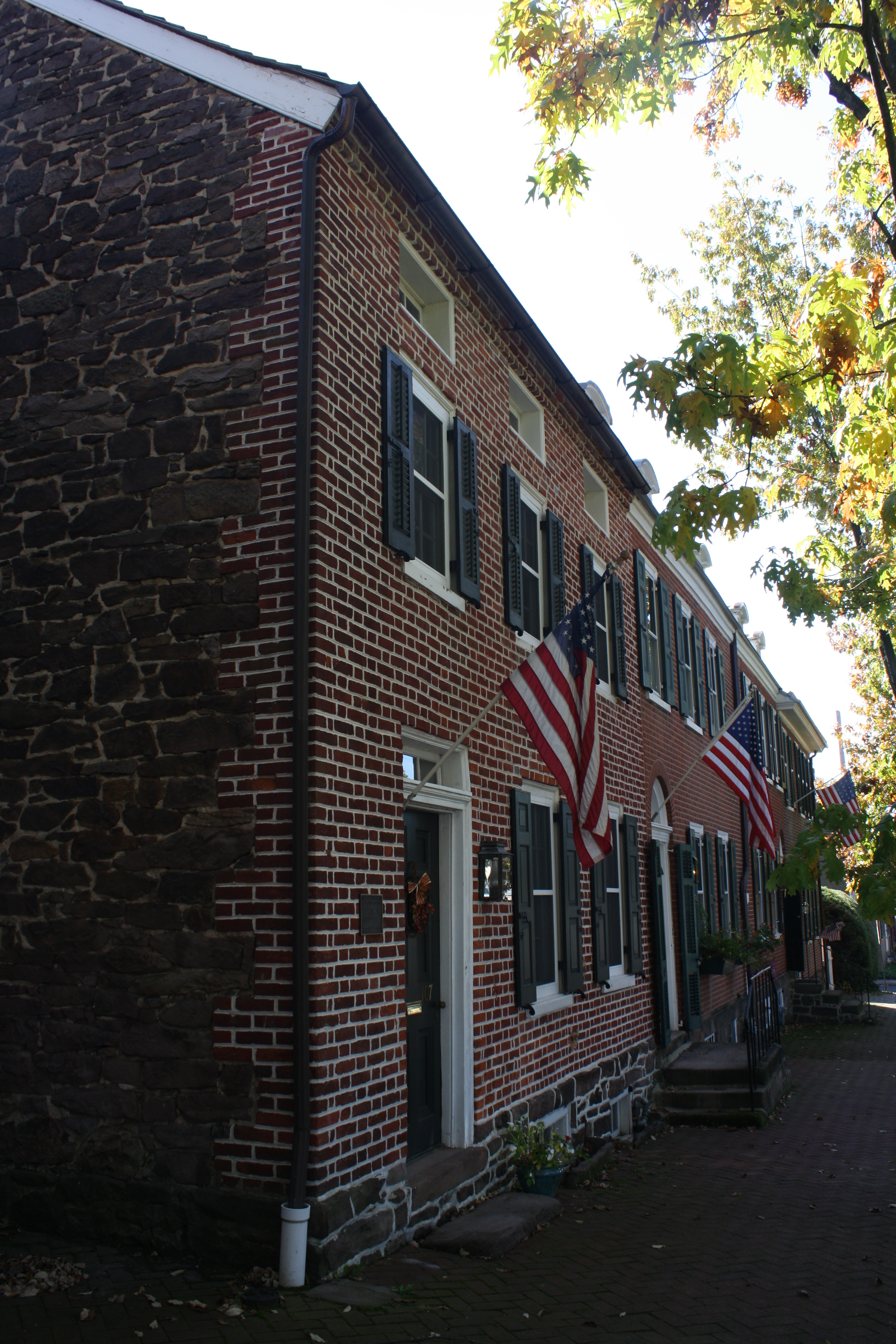
The Margaret Thornton House.

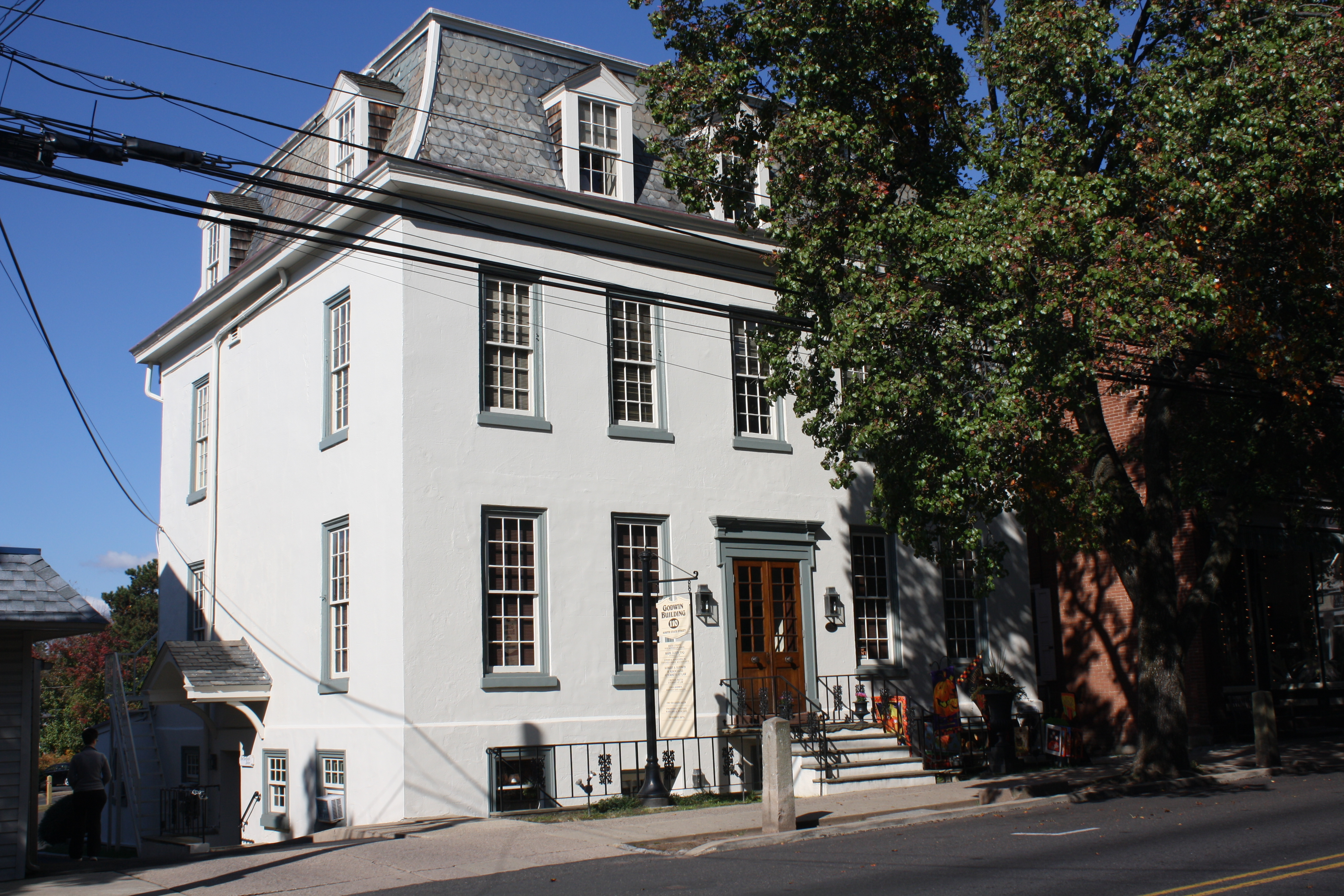
The Godwin Building.

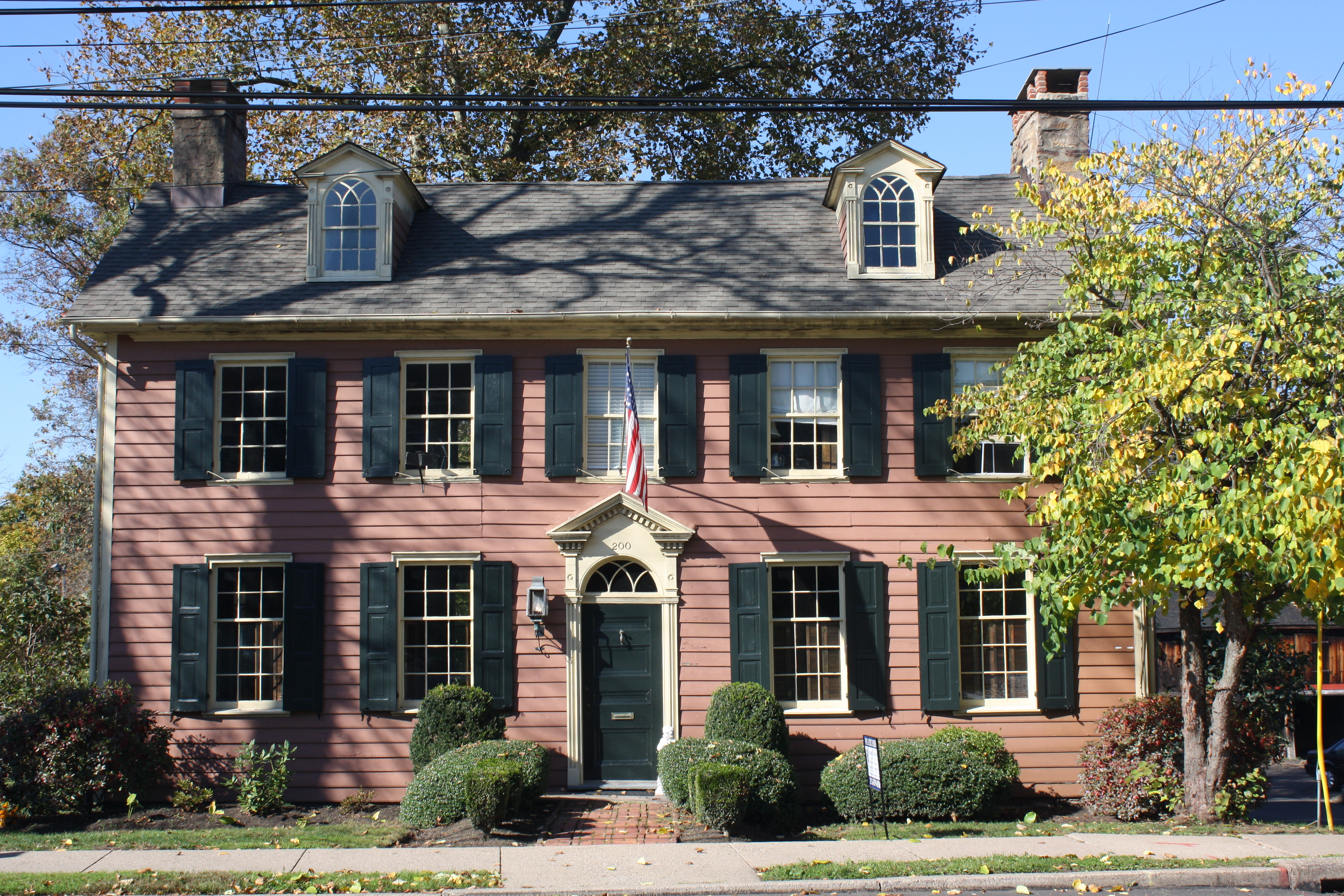
Court St.
