= The Godwin Building =

Coordinates: 40.2275°N 74.9370°W

The Godwin Building, 2011

The Godwin Building, 1905

The Godwin Building is a historic building in Newtown, Pennsylvania. Built in 1868 as a bank, the building is now a law office.

== History ==
The building was constructed in 1868 by Barclay Smith to house a new financial venture, the Newtown Banking Company. The Newtown Banking Company financed The Philadelphia and Newtown Railroad, a Newtown-based railroad company that built rails from Philadelphia to Newtown. By 1878, the bank had failed.

A 1905 photograph showed that the building, then owned by Mark Granite, housed a general store. In 1941 it was named the Keller Memorial Building after owner Clayton Keller, who worked there as a barber for over 30 years.

In 1983 it became The Godwin Building when it was purchased by Robert A. Godwin, an attorney who renovated it for his law practice. The building has also been home to a number to a psychotherapy practice, accounting firm, nail and hair salons, and a gift shop.
