= Newtown Historic District =

Newtown Historic District may refer to:

in the United States

(by state)

- Newtown Borough Historic District, Newtown, Connecticut, listed on the NRHP in Connecticut
- Newtown Historic District in Newtown (Sarasota, Florida)
- Newtown Historic District (Newtown, Pennsylvania), listed on the NRHP in Pennsylvania
- Newtown Historic District (Copperhill, Tennessee), listed on the NRHP in Tennessee
- Newtown Historic District (Newtown, Virginia), listed on the NRHP in Virginia
- Newtown Historic District (Staunton, Virginia), listed on the NRHP in Virginia
- Newtown-Stephensburg Historic District, Stephens City, Virginia, listed on the NRHP in Virginia
