= Cash mob =

Group of people assembling at a business to make purchases

A cash mob is a group of people who assemble at a local business to make purchases. The purpose of these mobs is to support both the local businesses and the overall community. They may also serve a secondary purpose in providing social opportunities. They are a form of flash mob, and are inspired by them. The cash mob is related to the carrotmob, which supports companies for ethical, mainly pro-environmental actions.

Cash mobs also sometimes mobilize to raise money for a cause, as in the case of the cash mob that descended on a Planned Parenthood in Portland, Maine in October 2012, raising $2,000 in minutes.

== History ==
As reported by Public Radio International, the idea of a cash mob was first started by Chris Smith, a blogger and engineer from Buffalo, New York, in August 2011 at a wine shop in Buffalo. He organized more than 100 people to purchase items from City Wine Merchant on August 5. Smith described the mobs as a "reverse Groupon" that are meant to make a "chance for business owners to begin building a longer-term relationship with customers".

A group of people living in Cleveland, claim to be the originators of the term and event. Their first cash mob event was started on November 16, 2011 where they gathered around 40 people to shop at a local bookstore. After the event, the group started a blog to popularize the idea, leading to other cash mobs being started in other cities. The group from Cleveland has stated that, after the idea of cash mobs began being picked up by Occupy Wall Street groups, cash mobs are not meant to be "a political or social organization ... or meant to be an answer to economic crisis."

After the concept was started in general, the popularity of cash mobs began spreading through sites like Facebook and Twitter, eventually leading to cash mobs being formed in more than 32 states and in Canada. Local radio stations have also seen extensive use by cash mob organizers to inform others.

One of the earliest cash mob blogs created a list of "Mob Rules" that advised how other cash mobs should be coordinated. These rules included "choosing stores that are locally owned ... getting approval from the store's owners and setting a $20 spending commitment for mobbers." Other rules include having the mob gathering near a local bar or restaurant that the group can attend after the shopping event.

== Locations ==
Cash mob groups have been started in a number of different cities:

- Adrian, Ohio
- Ann Arbor, Michigan
- Arcata, California
- Atlanta
- Austin, Texas
- Bellport, New York
- Blacksburg, Virginia
- Buffalo, New York
- Carbondale, Colorado
- Charlottesville, Virginia
- Chilliwack, British Columbia
- Cleveland Heights, Ohio
- Colleyville, Texas
- Coldwater, Michigan
- Columbia, South Carolina
- Detroit
- Eugene, Oregon
- Elmira, New York
- Elyria, Ohio
- Fort Myers, Florida
- Folsom, California
- Fort Smith, Arkansas
- Franklin, North Carolina
- Gaylord, Michigan
- Halifax, Nova Scotia
- Hamilton Township (Mercer), New Jersey
- Hampton, New York
- Hayward, California
- Hutchinson, Kansas
- Independence, Ohio
- Ithaca, New York
- Kansas City, Missouri
- Kingwood, Texas
- Knoxville, Tennessee
- Lompoc, California
- Levittown, New York
- Long Beach, California
- Loveland, Colorado
- Mansfield, Texas
- Montpelier, Vermont
- Muskegon, Michigan
- Norman, Oklahoma
- Oakland, California
- Ohio City, Ohio
- Richmond, Virginia
- San Antonio, Texas
- San Diego
- Scranton, Pennsylvania
- Spring Arbor, Michigan
- Topeka, Kansas
- Tremont, Ohio
- Warwick, Rhode Island
- Wilmington, North Carolina
- Windsor, Ontario
- Sarnia, Ontario
- St. Albert, Alberta

The Chamber of Commerce in Huntington, New York has supported the creation of a cash mob, forming it into a "monthly event to help support local businesses and bring attention to the area as a retail destination." Chamber members said that, after the first location, the future ones will be chosen via a lottery and that participants will "receive 20 percent discounts, and refreshments will be served," but are expected to spend more than $20.

The Cash Mob in St. Albert, Alberta, Canada, is organized by Heidi Fedoruk from Leading Edge Physiotherapy and has been running since September 2012. They have mobbed 33 local businesses, averaging 60 mobbers per evening, with a high of 122. She has been keeping statistics and they have created a stimulus of over $100,000 infused into the local economy, twenty dollars at a time. One business saw $3400 sales in one hour, which they had never done before in a week. The St. Albert Cash Mob is frequently featured in the local newspapers https://web.archive.org/web/20140827154824/http://www.stalbertleader.com/cashmob/ as well as television including this link to

In Levittown, New York a cash mob for a local stationery store owner was made into a short documentary, Cash Mob for Avi, and was selected into the Big Apple Film Festival in 2014.
