= Newtown Presbyterian Church =

Historic church in Pennsylvania, United States

- U.S. National Register of Historic Places
- U.S. Historic district
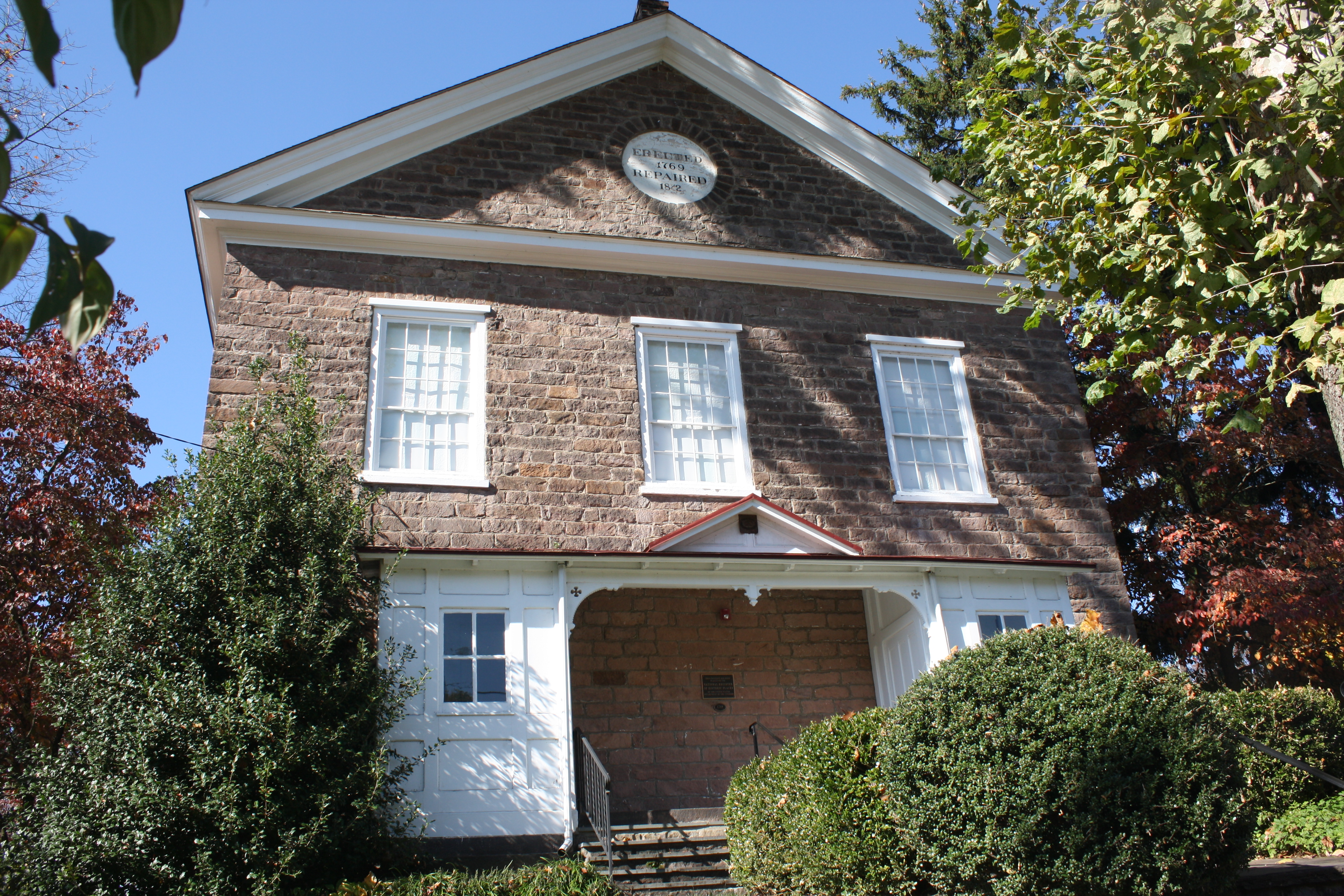
- Newtown Presbyterian Church. October 2012

- Location within Pennsylvania Location within the United States
- Location: Sycamore Street, Newtown, Bucks County, Pennsylvania
- Coordinates: 40°13′56″N 74°56′20″W
- Area: 2.2 acres (0.89 ha)
- Built: 1769, 1842
- Architect: Hutchinson, Mathias
- Architectural style: Greek Revival
- NRHP reference No.: 87001212
- Added to NRHP: July 16, 1987

The Newtown Presbyterian Church, also known as the Old Presbyterian Church of Newtown, is a historic Presbyterian church complex and national historic district located in Newtown, Bucks County, Pennsylvania.

It was listed on the National Register of Historic Places in July 1987.

== History and architectural features ==
This old edifice is the second of four Presbyterian Church buildings that were erected in Newtown. The first was built in 1734, and William Tennent, the first minister, preached there one Sunday a month.

The first pastor to be installed in Newtown took office in 1752. That church building was erected in 1769 and remodeled in 1842. It is a two-and-one-half-story, rectangular, stone building that was designed in the Greek Revival style. A porch and two vestibules were added circa 1880.

One of the largest buildings in town in December 1776, it was commandeered by General George Washington for use by the Continental Army as a hospital, a jail and a prisoner of war camp during the American Revolution. After the Battle of Trenton, several hundred Hessians were held there before they began their long march to Philadelphia where, they were exchanged for American soldiers.

The small building on the south side of the church is known as the Session House. It was built sometime around 1800, and is a one-and-one-half-story, rubble fieldstone structure. It was used as a meeting place for the session, and is one of only two such buildings in the county still standing. Because most early session members were farmers and did not get to town except on Sunday, the Session House provided a quiet place for conducting church business.

The church cemetery is located behind the church building, and is partially surrounded by a stone wall. Eight British flags mark the graves of men who fought in the French and Indian Wars while twenty-eight flags mark the graves of church members who served under General Washington.

== Gallery ==
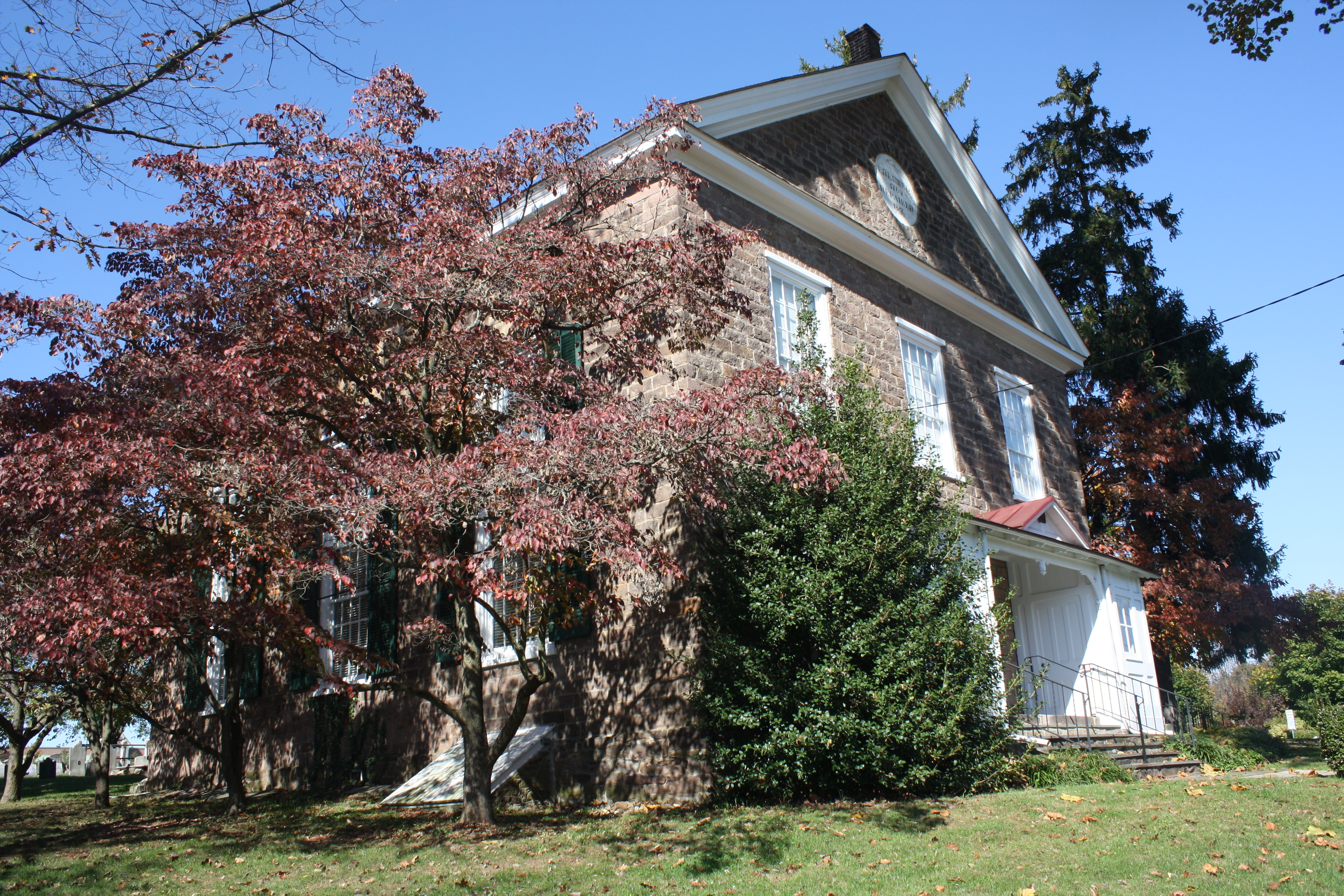
Newtown Presbyterian Church.

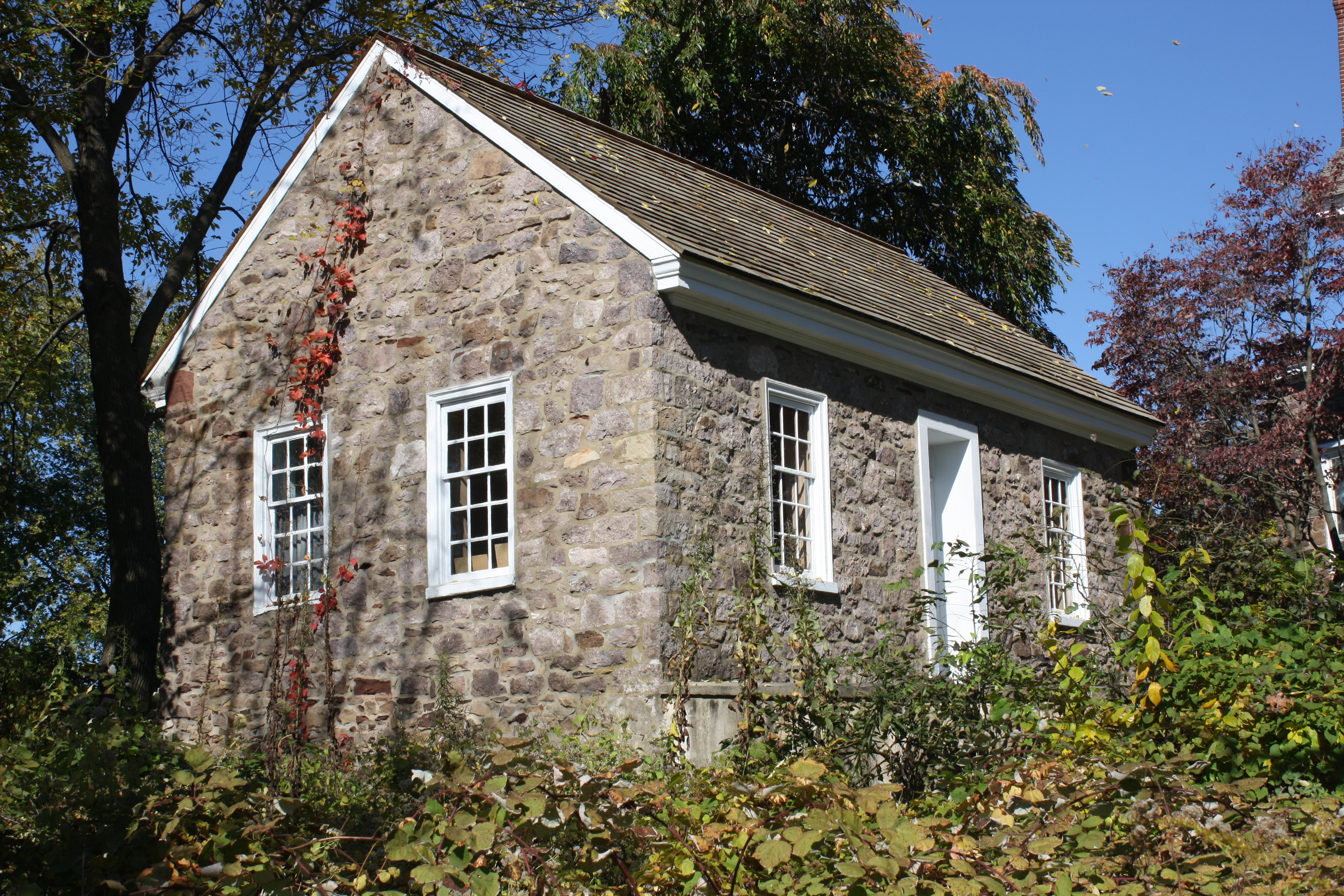
Session House.

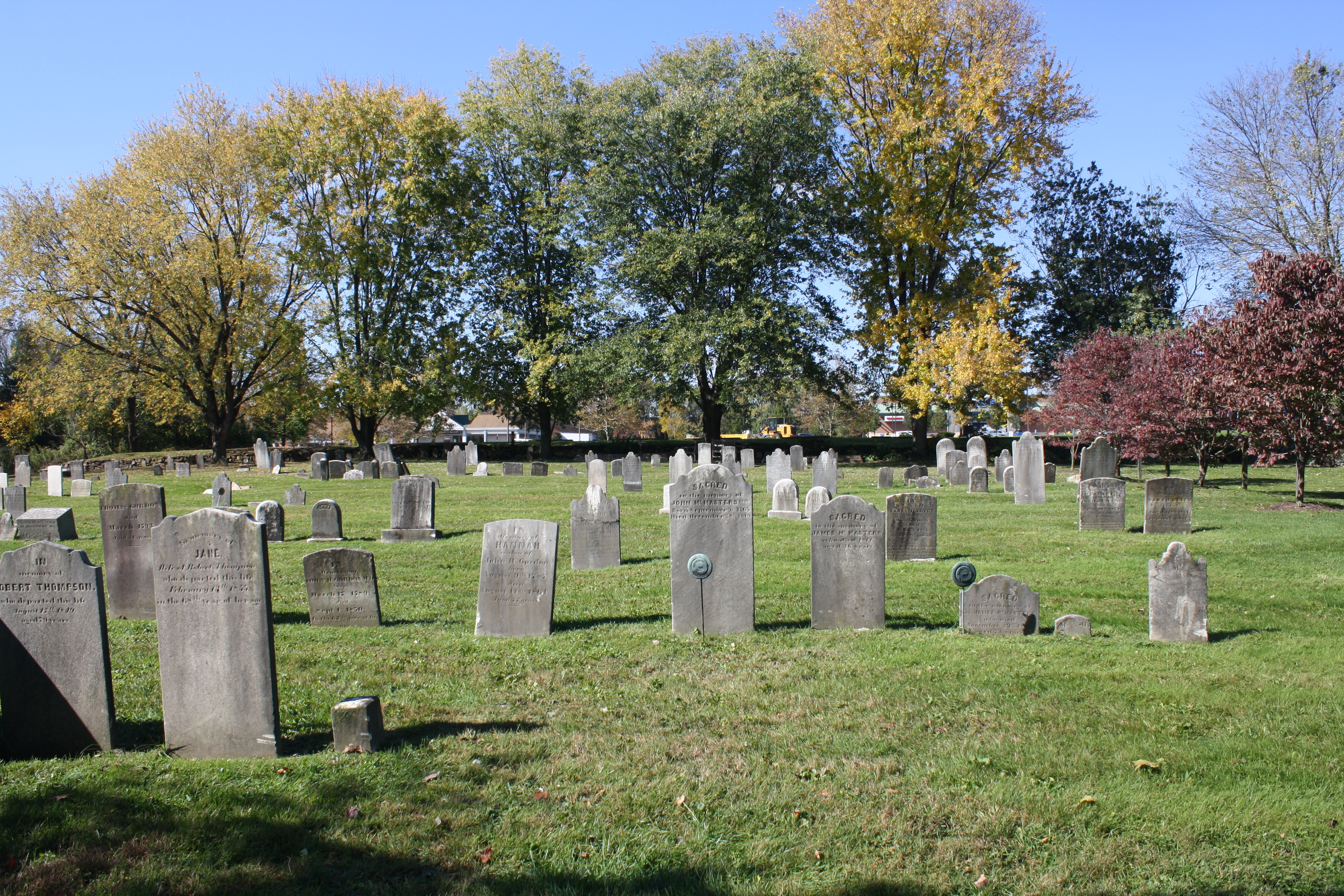
Cemetery.
