= Newtown Theatre =

Historic Theater in the United States

Coordinates: 40°13′53″N 74°56′12″W

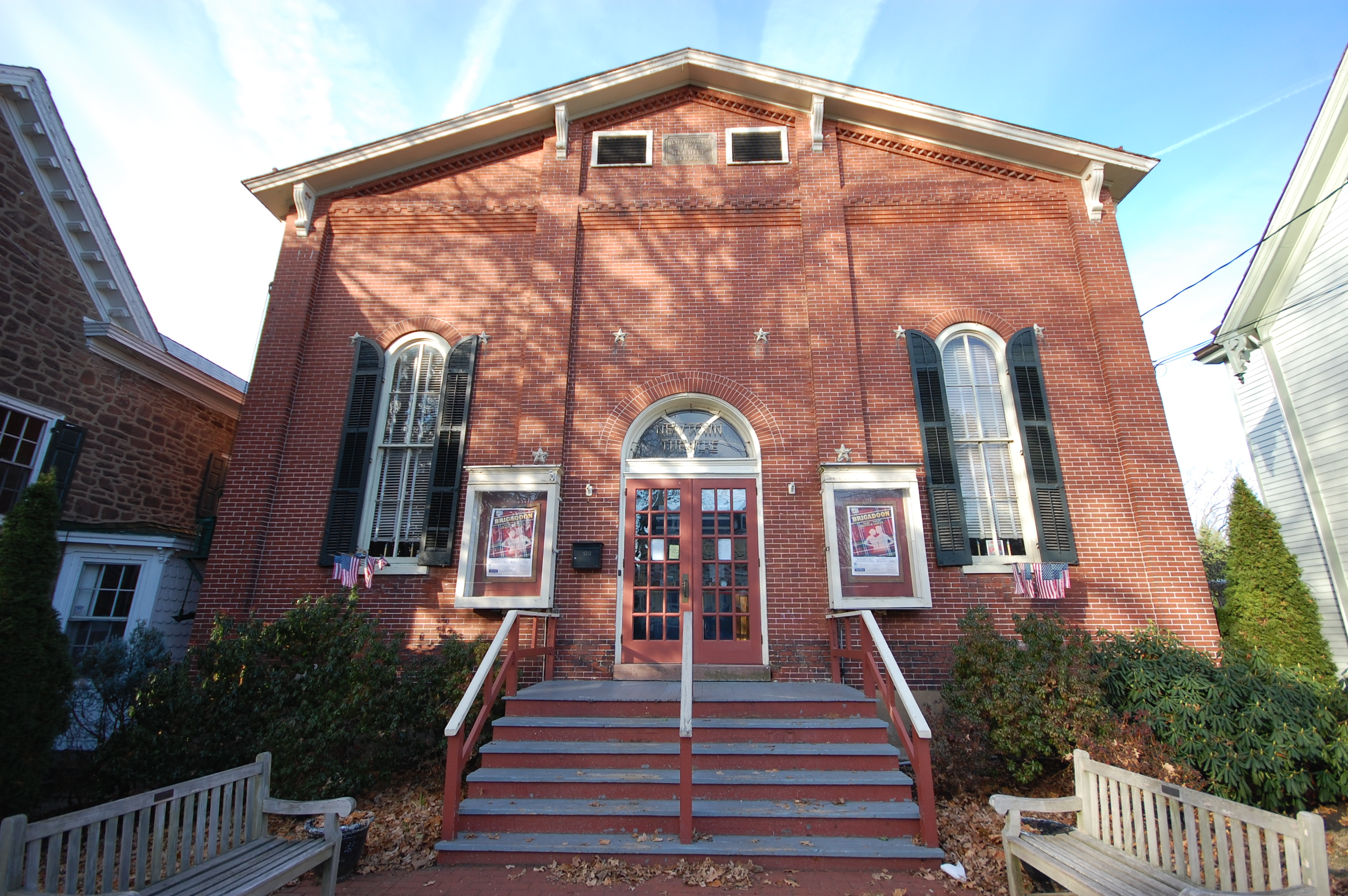
- Exterior of the Newtown Theatre, Newtown, Pennsylvania, November 2013
- Interactive map of Newtown Theatre
- Address: 120 North State Street
- Location: Newtown, Pennsylvania, U.S.
- Owner: Community Welfare Council
- Capacity: 276
- Type: Performing arts venue

Construction
- Opened: 1831
- Renovated: 1883, 2019, 2021, 2024

Website
- www.thenewtowntheatre.com

The Newtown Theatre is a historic, non-profit movie theater and performing arts venue in Newtown, Bucks County, Pennsylvania. Originally constructed in 1831 as a free and independent anti-sectarian house of worship, it is recognized as one of the oldest continuously operating movie theatres in the United States. Over time, it has served as a community meeting hall, cultural center, and cinema; today it presents classic films, concerts, comedy, theatrical performances, and special events. The theatre seats 276 and is governed by the non-profit Community Welfare Council.

== History ==
=== Early years (1831–1880s) ===
In April 1831, Joseph and Susan Archambault deeded Lot 18 of Newtown Common to establish a “free and independent anti-sectarian house of worship and free burying ground," creating the Free Church. By the 1840s, it became known as Newtown Hall, hosting town meetings and lectures with statutory permissions granted in 1842 and 1853.

The hall gained popularity with minstrel shows, medicine shows, circuses, dances, and Swarthmore Chautauqua performances (1912–1929). It was rebuilt in 1883; enhancements followed with a gallery (1887), electric lighting (1894), and a fire escape (1904).

=== Transition to entertainment ===
In the late 19th century, Newtown Hall hosted concerts, theatre, and educational events. The Newtown Orchestra debuted in 1884, and the first film screening occurred in 1906. In 1938, a court decree officially authorized films and theatrical performances while preserving its religious and burial purposes.

=== Film era (1936–1972) ===
Leased in 1936 to Newtown Exhibitors, Inc., the hall hosted films until the early 1950s. In 1953, the Community Welfare Council (CWC) took over operations. In 1972, projectionist Amos Farruggio subleased and managed programming until his passing in 1980.

=== Non-profit operation (1980–2000s) ===
The CWC became substitute trustee in 1980 amid financial and tax challenges. Following Marjorie Farruggio’s death in 2005, management transitioned in 2007 to Newtown Hall Theatre, Inc., a 501(c)(3) nonprofit.

=== Renovations and modern era (2000s–present) ===
In 2002, air conditioning was installed for a local premiere of Signs, portions of which were filmed in Newtown.

Digital projection replaced 35 mm equipment in 2014. Programming broadened after 2015 to include concerts and comedy.

A 2019 upgrade added a concert-grade sound system. In late 2021, renovations introduced new seating, hardwood floors, acoustic enhancements, a wheelchair lift, and an accessible restroom.

In summer 2024, the balcony and restrooms were overhauled under a US$1.1 million project. It also included a US$500,000 concert lighting system and LED video wall donated by a single patron.

Today, the venue features classic film screenings, concerts, comedy, and theatrical events.

== Architecture ==
The Newtown Theatre is a two-story brick building, erected in 1883 to replace the original hall. Its façade includes a rebuilt 2021 front porch with a wheelchair lift, and expansive windows typical of 19th-century civic design.

Renovations in 2021 introduced vintage-style seating, hardwood floors, plaster, acoustic panels, and accessibility upgrades. The most recent upgrades, completed in 2024, refurbished the balcony and expanded the basement restrooms.

== Programming ==
Since the 19th century, the theatre has hosted lectures, dances, concerts, and theatre. It began showing films in 1906 and continued cinematic programming throughout the 20th century.

Today, it schedules film nights, live concerts, stand-up comedy, theatre, and special events, and is available for private and community rentals.
