= Newtown Friends Meetinghouse and Cemetery =

Historic cemetery in Bucks County, Pennsylvania, US

- U.S. National Register of Historic Places
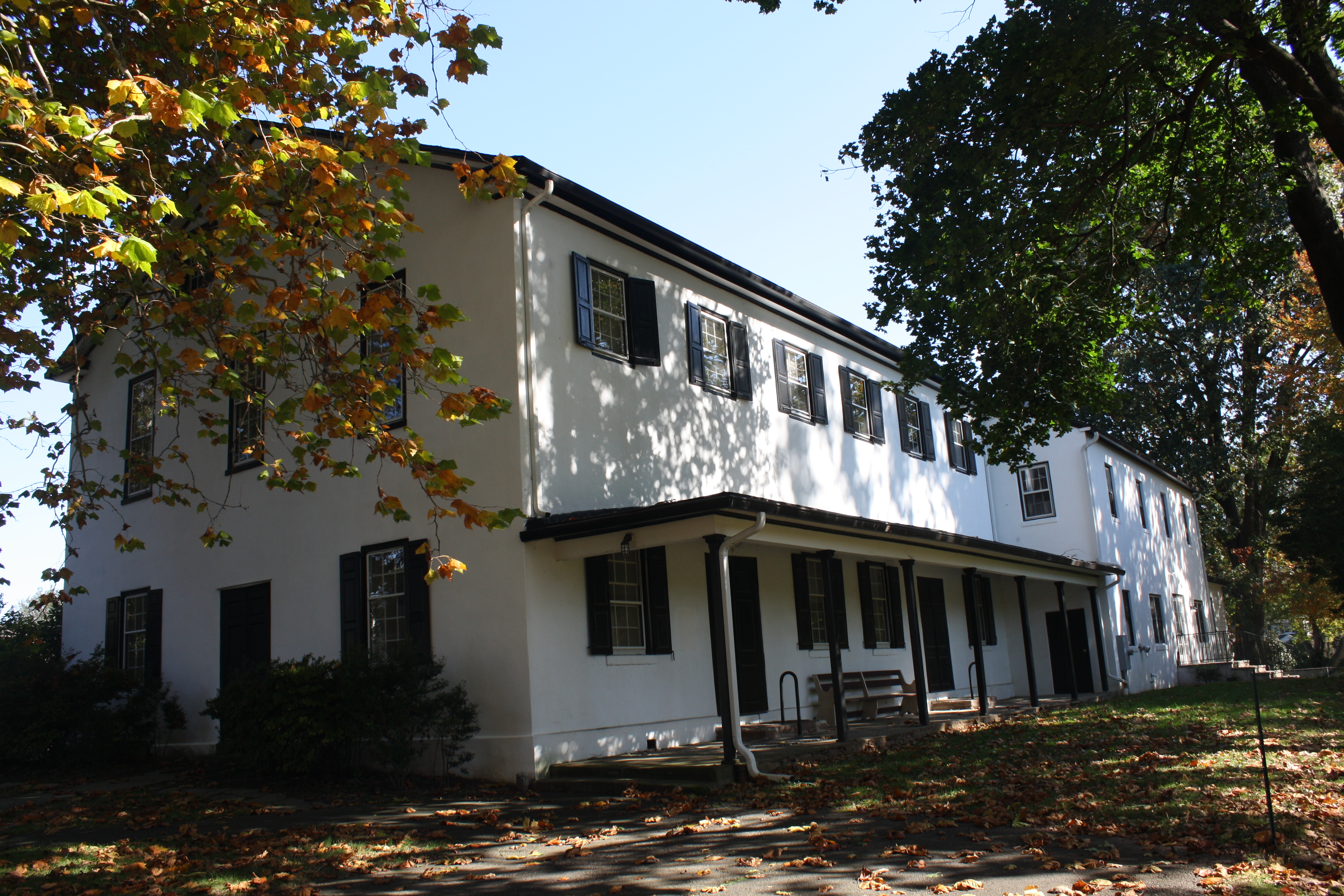
- Newtown Friends Meetinghouse. October 2012.

- Location within Pennsylvania Location within the United States
- Location: Court St., Newtown, Bucks County, Pennsylvania
- Coordinates: 40°13′31″N 74°56′09″W
- Built: 1817
- NRHP reference No.: 77001129
- Added to NRHP: July 21, 1977

Newtown Friends Meetinghouse and Cemetery is a historic Quaker meetinghouse and cemetery in Newtown, Bucks County, Pennsylvania. It was built in 1817, and is a two-story, stuccoed stone building with a gable roof. It measures 60 feet by 40 feet, 6 bays long and 3 bays deep. A one-story porch was added in 1866, and the second floor was added in 1900. Also on the property is a contributing horse shed, built in 1819. Adjacent to the meeting house is a contributing cemetery.

The site was listed on the National Register of Historic Places in 1977.

== Notable interments ==
- Edward Hicks (1780–1849), Quaker minister and American folk artist
- Michael Hutchinson Jenks (1795–1867), U.S. Congressman
