= Newtown, Bucks County, Pennsylvania =

Borough in Pennsylvania, US

Newtown, Pennsylvania
- Borough
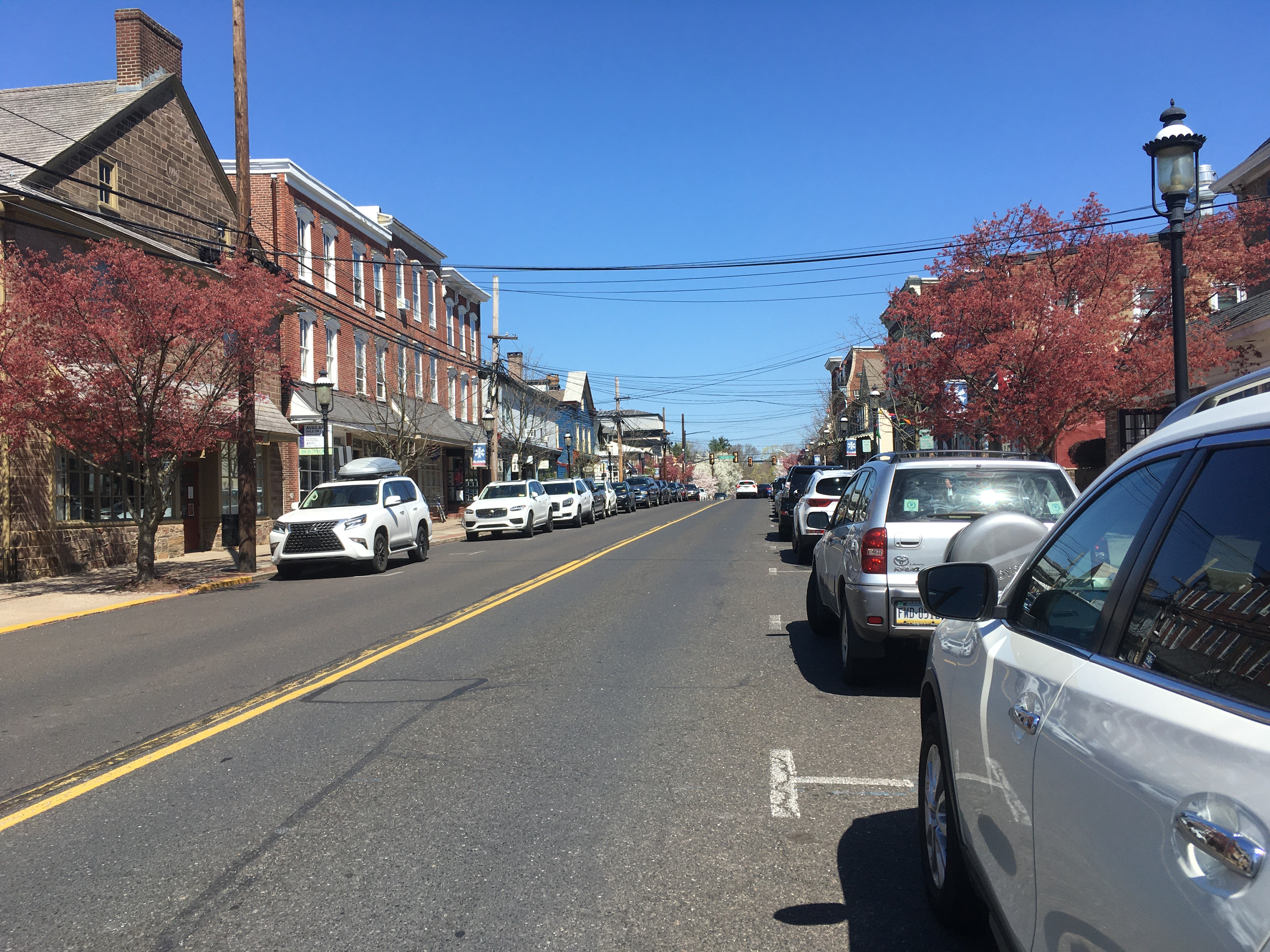
- State Street in Newtown
- Motto: "a good place to live, shop and worship..."
- Location of Newtown in Bucks County, Pennsylvania (left) and of Bucks County in Pennsylvania (right)

- Location of Newtown in Pennsylvania Newtown (the United States)
- Coordinates: 40°13′42″N 74°55′56″W
- Country: United States
- State: Pennsylvania
- County: Bucks
- Founded: 1684
- Incorporated: April 16, 1838

Government
  - Mayor: John Burke

Area
  - Total: 0.55 sq mi (1.43 km^{2})
  - Land: 0.55 sq mi (1.43 km^{2})
  - Water: 0 sq mi (0.00 km^{2})
- Elevation: 174 ft (53 m)

Population (2020)
  - Total: 2,268
  - Density: 4,097.1/sq mi (1,581.88/km^{2})
- Time zone: UTC-5 (Eastern (EST))
  - Summer (DST): UTC-4 (EDT)
- ZIP Code: 18940
- Area codes: 215, 267 and 445 exchanges: 434, 497, 504, 550, 579, 626, 860, 867, 944, 968
- FIPS code: 42-54184
- GNIS feature ID: 1214973
- Website: Borough website

Newtown is a borough in Bucks County, Pennsylvania, United States. The population was 2,268 at the 2020 census. It is located just west of the Trenton, New Jersey metropolitan area, and is part of the greater Philadelphia metropolitan area. It is entirely surrounded by Newtown Township, from which it separated in 1838. State Street is the main commercial thoroughfare with wide sidewalks, shops, taverns, and restaurants.

== History ==
=== 17th century ===
Newtown was founded by William Penn in 1684. Newtown was one of several towns that William Penn organized around Philadelphia to provide country homes for city residents and to support farming communities.

=== 18th century ===
It was the county seat of Bucks County, Pennsylvania, from 1726 until 1813, when it was replaced by a more central Doylestown. After his December 26, 1776, morning march to Trenton, and before the Battle of Princeton, Continental Army commander-in-chief George Washington made his headquarters in Newtown.

=== 19th century ===
Newtown was incorporated on April 16, 1838, and has been enlarged three times since. In 1969 Newtown's entire central business district was placed on the National Register of Historic Places. This designation was largely due to Newtown's historic clock tower. Newtown is enhanced by unique boutiques, colleges, cuisine, a climate for industry, Pennsylvania's most popular state park (Tyler State Park) and a Heritage Walk that traces the very steps of George Washington. The Law School Admission Council is headquartered in Newtown Township. As a result, many American lawyers have heard of Newtown. The oldest operating movie theater in America is Newtown Theatre at 120 North State Street.

Newtown is known for its wealth of history. One of the most noted former residents of Newtown was painter Edward Hicks, who lived in Newtown for over forty years with his family, where he was able to own his own business. Newtown has an established historical society called the Newtown Historic Association.

The Newtown Hardware House has been in continuous operation for over 130 years, which ranks as the longest tenure for any single business in Newtown.

The Half-Moon Inn, Newtown Creek Bridge, Newtown Friends Meetinghouse and Cemetery, Newtown Historic District, Newtown Presbyterian Church, and George F. Tyler Mansion are listed on the National Register of Historic Places.

== Geography ==
According to the U.S. Census Bureau, the borough has a total area of 0.6 square mile (1.4 km^{2}), all land. The Newtown Creek, a tributary of the Neshaminy Creek, flows south along the western boundary between the borough and the township of Newtown.

=== Climate ===
According to the Köppen climate classification system, Newtown has a Humid subtropical climate (Cfa). Cfa climates are characterized by all months having an average mean temperature > 32.0 °F (0.0 °C), at least four months with an average mean temperature ≥ 50.0 °F (10.0 °C), at least one month with an average mean temperature ≥ 71.6 °F (22.0 °C) and no significant precipitation difference between seasons. Although most summer days are slightly humid in Newtown, episodes of heat and high humidity can occur, with heat index values > 108 °F (42 °C). Since 1981, the highest air temperature was 102.9 °F (39.4 °C) on July 22, 2011, and the highest daily average mean dew point was 75.2 °F (24.0 °C) on August 13, 2016. The average wettest month is July, which corresponds with the annual peak in thunderstorm activity. Since 1981, the wettest calendar day was 6.33 inches (161 mm) on August 27, 2011. During the winter months, the average annual extreme minimum air temperature is 0.4 °F (−17.6 °C). Since 1981, the coldest air temperature was −10.5 °F (−23.6 °C) on January 22, 1984. Episodes of extreme cold and wind can occur, with wind chill values < −10 °F (−23 °C). The average annual snowfall (Nov.–Apr.) is between 24 inches (61 cm) and 30 inches (76 cm). Ice storms and large snowstorms depositing ≥ 12 inches (30 cm) of snow occur once every few years, particularly during nor’easters from December through February.

Climate data for Newtown, elevation 174 ft (53 m), 1991–2020 normals, extremes 1981–2018
Month	Jan	Feb	Mar	Apr	May	Jun	Jul	Aug	Sep	Oct	Nov	Dec	Year
Record high °F (°C)	71.4 (21.9)	77.6 (25.3)	87.4 (30.8)	94.2 (34.6)	95.0 (35.0)	96.3 (35.7)	102.9 (39.4)	100.1 (37.8)	98.0 (36.7)	88.9 (31.6)	80.9 (27.2)	75.6 (24.2)	102.9 (39.4)
Mean daily maximum °F (°C)	40.3 (4.6)	43.0 (6.1)	51.3 (10.7)	63.2 (17.3)	72.8 (22.7)	82.0 (27.8)	86.3 (30.2)	84.6 (29.2)	77.7 (25.4)	66.4 (19.1)	55.4 (13.0)	44.2 (6.8)	64.0 (17.8)
Daily mean °F (°C)	32.0 (0.0)	34.2 (1.2)	41.6 (5.3)	52.3 (11.3)	61.8 (16.6)	71.3 (21.8)	75.9 (24.4)	74.4 (23.6)	67.2 (19.6)	55.5 (13.1)	45.9 (7.7)	36.1 (2.3)	54.1 (12.3)
Mean daily minimum °F (°C)	23.8 (−4.6)	25.3 (−3.7)	31.9 (−0.1)	41.4 (5.2)	50.7 (10.4)	60.6 (15.9)	65.6 (18.7)	64.2 (17.9)	56.6 (13.7)	44.7 (7.1)	36.5 (2.5)	28.0 (−2.2)	44.2 (6.8)
Record low °F (°C)	−10.5 (−23.6)	−2.7 (−19.3)	3.5 (−15.8)	17.9 (−7.8)	34.1 (1.2)	42.0 (5.6)	48.1 (8.9)	42.8 (6.0)	35.8 (2.1)	25.2 (−3.8)	12.1 (−11.1)	−0.6 (−18.1)	−10.5 (−23.6)
Average precipitation inches (mm)	3.55 (90)	2.78 (71)	4.16 (106)	3.96 (101)	4.32 (110)	4.34 (110)	5.22 (133)	4.35 (110)	4.41 (112)	3.80 (97)	3.63 (92)	4.08 (104)	48.60 (1,234)
Average relative humidity (%)	65.9	62.2	58.2	57.6	62.1	66.3	66.6	68.8	69.8	69.0	67.6	67.6	65.2
Average dew point °F (°C)	21.5 (−5.8)	22.6 (−5.2)	28.0 (−2.2)	37.8 (3.2)	48.7 (9.3)	59.5 (15.3)	64.0 (17.8)	63.5 (17.5)	57.0 (13.9)	45.5 (7.5)	35.8 (2.1)	26.4 (−3.1)	42.6 (5.9)
Source: PRISM

=== Ecology ===
The plant hardiness zone is 7a with an average annual extreme minimum air temperature of 0.4 °F (−17.6 °C). The spring bloom typically begins by April 8 and fall color usually peaks by November 2.

== Demographics ==
Historical population
Census	Pop.	Note	%±
1850	580		—
1860	652		12.4%
1870	859		31.7%
1880	1,001		16.5%
1890	1,213		21.2%
1900	1,463		20.6%
1910	1,675		14.5%
1920	1,703		1.7%
1930	1,824		7.1%
1940	2,009		10.1%
1950	2,095		4.3%
1960	2,323		10.9%
1970	2,216		−4.6%
1980	2,519		13.7%
1990	2,565		1.8%
2000	2,312		−9.9%
2010	2,248		−2.8%
2020	2,268		0.9%

As of the 2010 census, the borough was 95.3% Non-Hispanic White, 0.8% Black or African American, 0.2% Native American, 1.2% Asian, and 1.2% were two or more races. 1.2% of the population were of Hispanic or Latino ancestry.

As of the 2000 census, there were 2,312 people, 920 households, and 595 families residing in the borough. The population density was 4,201.6 inhabitants per square mile (1,622.2/km^{2}). There were 936 housing units at an average density of 1,701.0 per square mile (656.8/km^{2}). The racial makeup of the borough was 96.93% White, 1.12% African American, 0.09% Native American, 0.74% Asian, 0.17% from other races, and 0.95% from two or more races. Hispanic or Latino of any race were 0.95% of the population.

There were 920 households, out of which 28.3% had children under the age of 18 living with them, 54.9% were married couples living together, 7.8% had a female householder with no husband present, and 35.3% were non-families. 29.9% of all households were made up of individuals, and 7.9% had someone living alone who was 65 years of age or older. The average household size was 2.35 and the average family size was 2.95.

In the borough the population was spread out, with 21.8% under the age of 18, 6.1% from 18 to 24, 28.2% from 25 to 44, 27.8% from 45 to 64, and 16.0% who were 65 years of age or older. The median age was 41 years. For every 100 females there were 82.2 males. For every 100 females age 18 and over, there were 80.0 males.

The median income for a household in the borough was $63,571, and the median income for a family was $78,215. Males had a median income of $54,231 versus $37,283 for females. The per capita income for the borough was $33,500. About 0.7% of families and 3.4% of the population were below the poverty line, including 1.5% of those under age 18 and 5.0% of those age 65 or over.

== Parks and recreation ==
Newtown Township, which surrounds the borough, has a system of bike and walking trails that lead to the borough in several places, including from Tyler State Park.

== Education ==
Newtown is in the Council Rock School District. While the district serves many towns in Lower Bucks County, Newtown Township is home to Council Rock High School North, Newtown Middle School (formerly Newtown Junior High), Goodnoe Elementary School, Newtown Elementary School, and the former Chancellor Street School, which now acts as the administrative building for the district. The only private school in the township is St. Andrews Catholic Education Center. George School, though associated with Newtown, is mostly in Middletown Township, and Newtown Friends School, though it bears Newtown's name, is located entirely in Middletown Township. The township is also the site of Bucks County Community College's main campus. La Salle University and Holy Family University also have satellite campuses on the Newtown Bypass.

== Infrastructure ==
=== Transportation ===
==== Highways ====
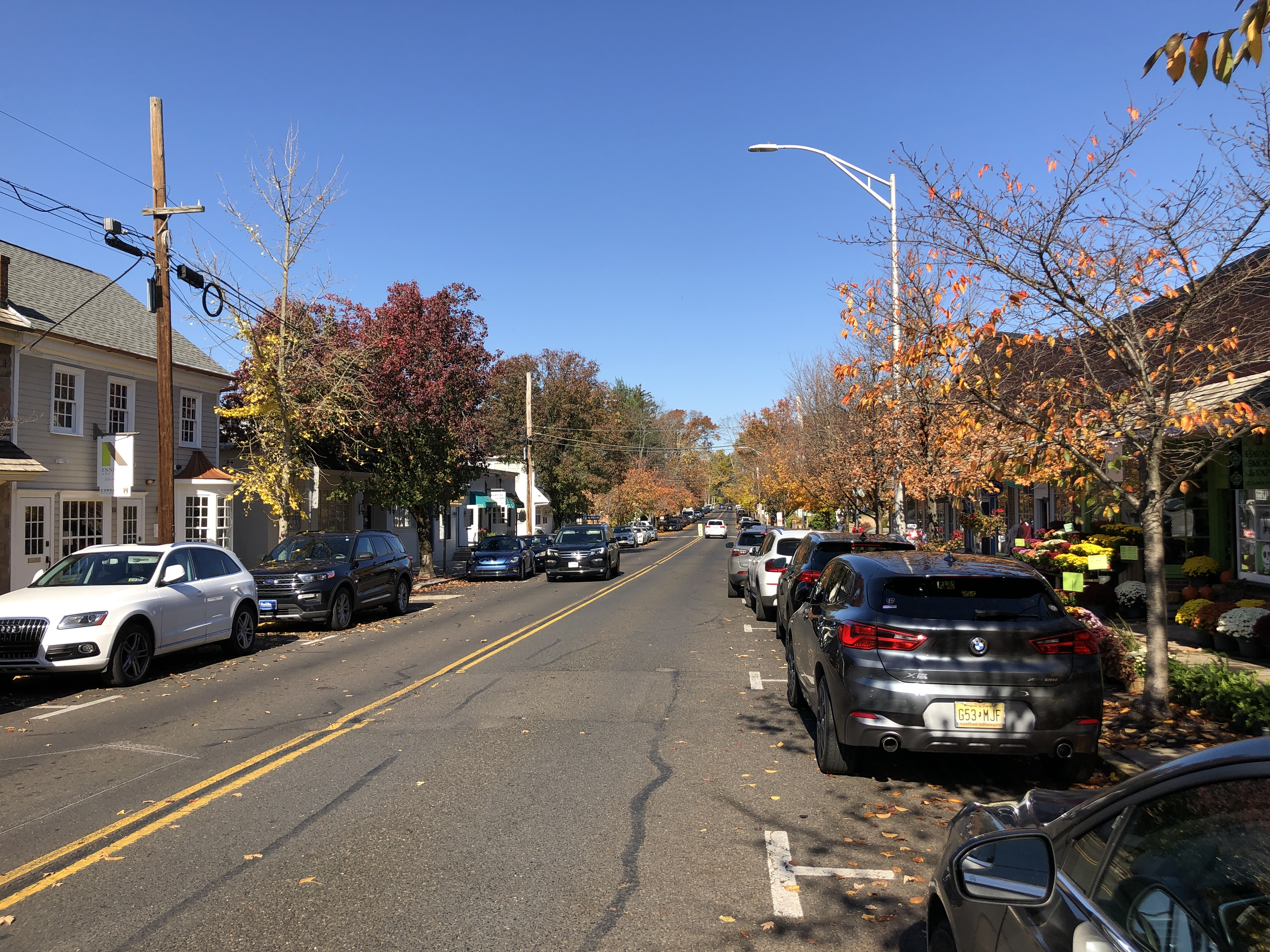
State Street northbound in Newtown

As of 2010 there were 10.09 miles (16.24 km) of public roads in Newtown, of which 1.55 miles (2.49 km) were maintained by the Pennsylvania Department of Transportation (PennDOT) and 8.54 miles (13.74 km) were maintained by the borough.

State Street runs through Newtown's main commercial area and intersects with Washington Avenue at the borough's infrastructural center. Pennsylvania Routes 532, 332, and 413 pass outside the borough in surrounding areas of Newtown Township via the Newtown Bypass.

==== Passenger trains ====
Until January 14, 1983, Newtown was served by SEPTA's Fox Chase/Newtown Line commuter rail service. At that time, service was suspended because of failing train equipment. Since then, there has been constant talk of reinstating service because of recent strong population growth in the surrounding area; however, this has not materialized. There was also a movement under way to convert the unused rail corridor into a bike trail that has thus far been unsuccessful because of resistance in surrounding communities.

SEPTA has no current plans to restore train service. The issue of resuming commuter service has been a political albatross almost from the day the trains stopped. Newtown remains the victim in all the political squabbling that has amassed over the years, as they have always given strong support of returned commuter service and have the most to gain. Author Joseph Schwieterman commented in 2001 that "few communities experiencing the loss of service have engaged in as protracted a dialogue about bringing back their passenger trains as Newtown. The continuing impasse has left many transit advocates skeptical that the borough will ever be accessible by rail again."

In September 2009, the Southampton-based Pennsylvania Transit Expansion Coalition (PA-TEC) began discussions with all townships along the rail line, as well as SEPTA officials, about possible resumption of passenger service. Bucks County officials and Newtown residents overwhelmingly supported PA-TEC's efforts, making it official in December 2009 when the Newtown Board of Supervisors passed a resolution supporting the full restoration of passenger service; neighboring Montgomery County officials are also supportive of re-thinking the rail corridor as well.

Toll Brothers built the "Newtown Station" development east of the station site.

The nearest station to Newtown is Woodbourne station on SEPTA's West Trenton Line.

==== Bus ====
SEPTA currently serves Newtown with SEPTA Suburban Bus Route 130, which runs to nearby Bucks County Community College and south to the Langhorne station along SEPTA Regional Rail's West Trenton Line and Frankford Avenue and Knights Road in Northeast Philadelphia.

== Notable people ==
- Peter Baltes, German musician
- Alex Cooper, podcast host
- James K. Coyne III (born 1946), U.S. Representative from Pennsylvania
- Sheena Monk, racing driver
- Christine Rawak, former athletic director at the University of Delaware
- Kathy Sledge, member of Sister Sledge
- Martha Schofield, abolitionist and suffragist
- Dave Terrell, racing driver
- Martha Wilson performance artist
- Rich Zober, racing driver
- Edward Hicks, painter
