= Carrotmob =

US nonprofit organization

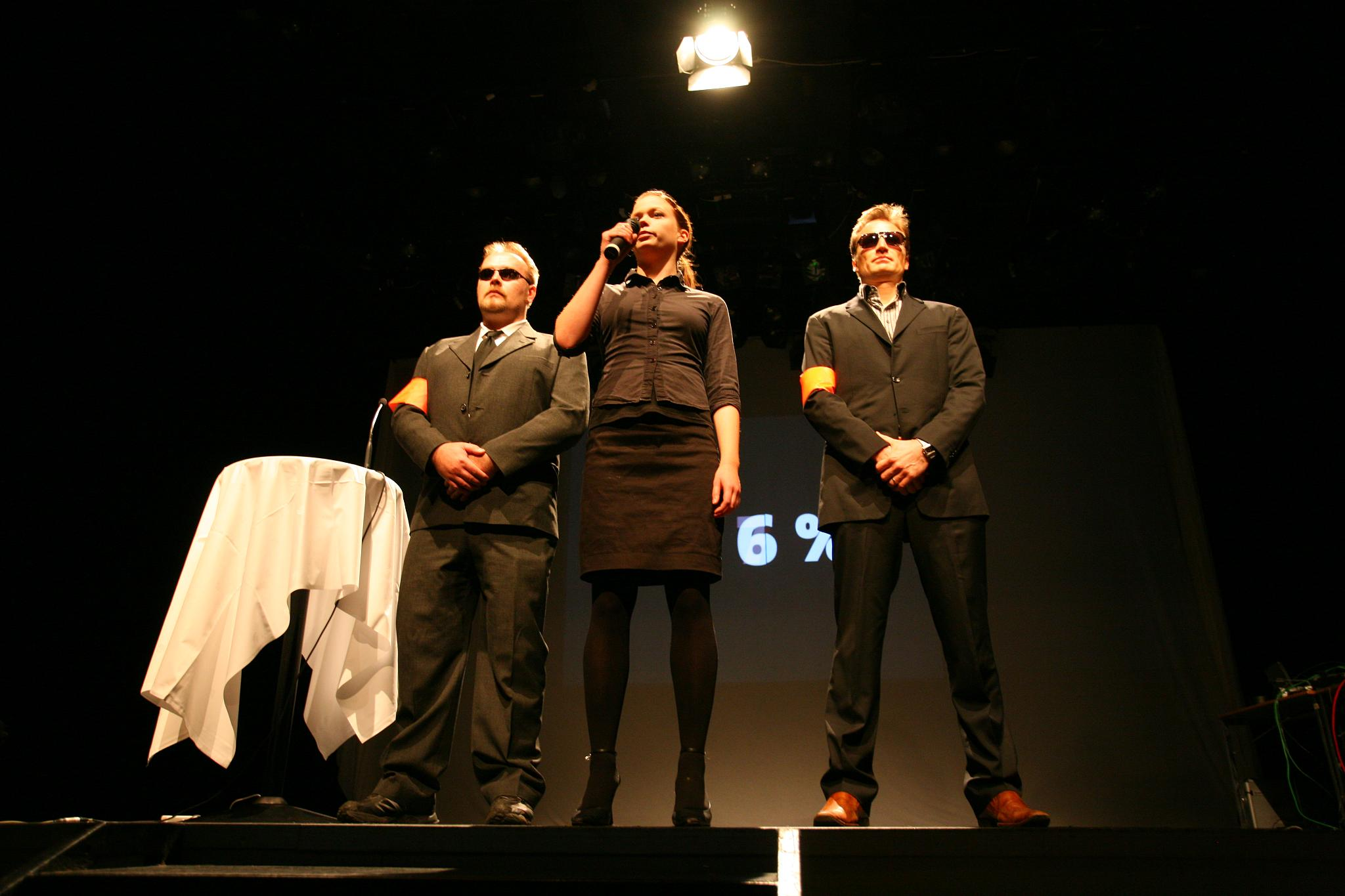
Carrotmob in Finland in 2008

Carrotmob is a nonprofit organization based in San Francisco, California. It uses buycotts (a form of consumer activism where a community buys a lot of goods from one company in a small time period) to reward a business's commitment to making socially responsible changes to the business. Carrotmob also refers to a global movement of community organizers who use the Carrotmob tactic of consumer activism as a way to help change businesses in their communities. In a Carrotmob buycott, businesses compete to be the most socially responsible business, and then a network of consumers spends money to support the winner.

== History ==
The first Carrotmob campaign happened on March 29, 2008, at K & D Market in San Francisco, California. It was organized by Brent Schulkin, the founder of Carrotmob. In the first campaign, Schulkin went to 23 convenience stores with a plan to transform one of the stores into the most environmentally-friendly store in the neighborhood. He promised to bring a "mob" of consumers to one store to spend money on one day. In order to receive the increased sales from this event, store owners were invited to place bids on what percentage of hypothetical revenue they would be willing to set aside and reinvest into making improvements which made their store more energy-efficient. The winning bid was 22%, by K & D Market. On the day of the campaign, hundreds of people arrived and spent over $9200. In exchange, the store took 22% of that revenue, and used it to do a full retrofit of their lighting system.

From May 2008 until February 2010, the Carrotmob project was funded by Virgance, an incubator company co-founded by Brent Schulkin. Virgance also incubated other projects, most notably 1BOG.

== Definition ==
Hoffmann and Hutter (2011) define carrotmob as "a temporary buycott in the form of a purchase flashmob by a group of consumers organized by activists. These activists chose the company offering the best bid within an auction as the target of the carrotmob. The best bid can be defined in terms of the company's monetary and/or nonmonetary inputs or in terms of expected improvements in issues the activists ask for."

== Carrotmob name ==
The name Carrotmob is derived from the carrot and stick idiom, which refers to a policy of offering a combination of rewards (carrots) and punishment (sticks) to induce behavior. Many traditional forms of consumer activism, such as boycotts and protests, rely on the "stick" method of attacking businesses.

== First global-scale campaign ==
The first large-scale Carrotmob campaign started on September 10, 2012, and will achieve on September 30, 2012. Its goal is to reach a revenue of $150,000 for the artisan roaster company called Thanksgiving Coffee, located in Fort Bragg, California.

If the goal is reached, Thanksgiving Coffee will employ a person who will study a way to travel coffee over the seas thanks to wind power (instead of oil). The results of this study would be shared with everyone.

If the campaign fails, the revenue will be given to "The Resilience Fund" association. This nonprofit organization started with the help of Thanksgiving Coffee and will use the funds to provide clean cookstoves to people in the communities around the world where Thanksgiving's coffee is grown.
