= Half-Moon Inn =

- U.S. National Register of Historic Places
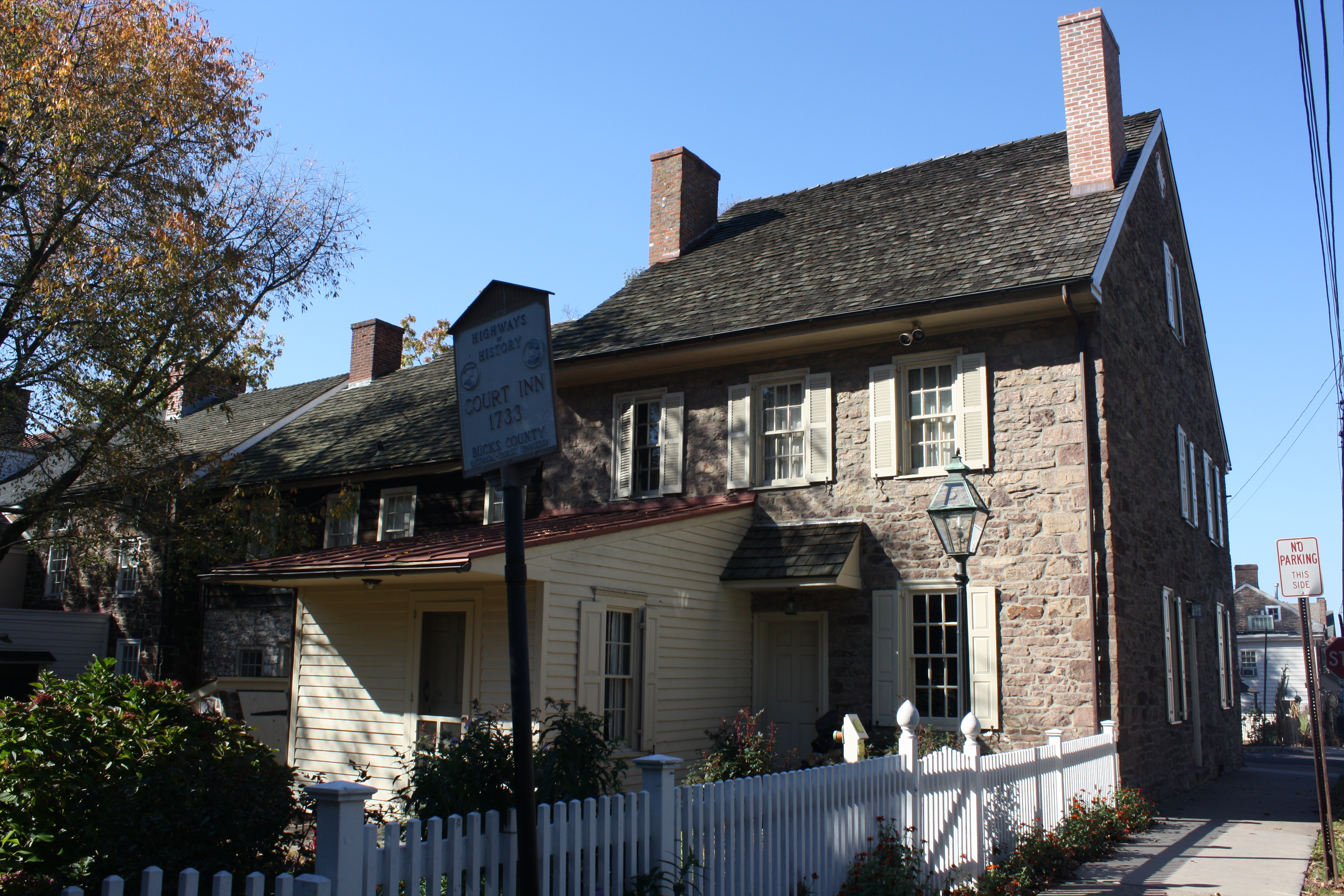
- Court Inn. October 2012.

- Location within Pennsylvania Location within the United States
- Location: 101 and 105 Court St., Newtown, Pennsylvania
- Coordinates: 40°13′40″N 74°56′10″W
- Area: 0.5 acres (0.20 ha)
- Built: 1733
- Architectural style: Colonial
- NRHP reference No.: 77001128
- Added to NRHP: December 6, 1977

The Half-Moon Inn, also known as the Court Inn and Thorton's Tavern, is an historic inn and tavern which is located in Newtown, Bucks County, Pennsylvania.

It was added to the National Register of Historic Places in 1977.

== History and architectural features ==
The original one-and-one-half-story, stone and frame building was built in 1733. Subsequent additions were erected in 1740, 1757 and 1792.

The section located at 101 Court Street is a two-and-one-half-story, three-bay, stone structure. It was restored in 1965 by the Newtown Historic Association. The section located at 105 Court Street has a stuccoed stone first story, with a timber frame second story that was added between 1825 and 1840.

This building housed an inn and tavern until 1818, during which time Newtown served as the county seat.

The building is currently home to the headquarters of the Newtown Historic Association and is open as a local history museum. The holdings include a special collection on early American folk painter, Edward Hicks (1780-1849).
